= Colin Mackenzie (disambiguation) =

Colin Mackenzie (1754–1821) was Surveyor General of India, art collector and orientalist.

Colin Mackenzie may also refer to:

- Colin Mackenzie (Scottish writer) (1796–1854), writer, editor, translator and compiler
- Colin Mackenzie (Indian Army officer) (1806–1881), British political officer in Afghanistan
- Colin Mackenzie (British Army officer) (1861–1956), British soldier
- Colin Mackenzie (anatomist) (1877–1938), Australian fauna park founder
- Colin Hercules Mackenzie (1898–1986), head of Force 136
- Colin Mackenzie, 1st Earl of Seaforth (c. 1590–1633), Highland clan chief and Scottish nobleman
- Colin Cam Mackenzie, 11th of Kintail (died 1594), Highland chief
- Colin MacKenzie (poet), Australian poet and songwriter
- Colin Mackenzie of Portmore (1770–1830), Scottish lawyer and companion of Sir Walter Scott
- Colin Mackenzie (athlete) (born 1963), Welsh javelin thrower

== See also ==
- Colin McKenzie (disambiguation)
