= Ray McCoy =

Ray McCoy may refer to:

- Ray McCoy (footballer)
- Ray McCoy (radio personality)
