= Healesville Sanctuary =

Zoo and heritage-listed cottage in Healesville, Victoria, Australia

- Shops at the sanctuary, 2011
- Interactive map of Healesville Sanctuary
- 37°40′56″S 145°31′54″E
- Date opened: 30 May 1934; 92 years ago
- Location: Healesville, Yarra Ranges, Victoria, Australia
- Land area: 11 ha (28 acres)
- No. of species: 140+
- Management: Victorian Zoological Parks and Gardens Board
- Website: zoo.org.au/Healesville

The Healesville Sanctuary, formally known as the Sir Colin MacKenzie Sanctuary, is a zoo specialising in Australian native animals, located at Healesville in the Yarra Ranges of Victoria, Australia. The sanctuary has a history of breeding native animals and is one of only two places to have successfully bred a platypus, the other being Sydney's Taronga Zoo. The sanctuary also assists with a breeding population of the endangered helmeted honeyeater.

The zoo is set in a natural bushland environment where paths wind through different habitat areas showcasing wallabies, wombats, dingoes, kangaroos, and over 200 native bird varieties. Guided tours, bird shows and information areas are available to visitors.

Within the grounds of the sanctuary is a cottage, built in c. 1920 – before the establishment of the sanctuary – that was added to the Victorian Heritage Register on 7 January 1999 in recognition of its historical, scientific, and social significance; and, on unknown dates, was also added to the non-statutory and now defunct Register of the National Estate, and a non-statutory local government heritage list.

== History ==
Professor Colin MacKenzie was a renowned Australian anatomist and pioneer of orthopaedics, was keenly interested in the comparative anatomy of Australian native fauna and was an early advocate for their protection. MacKenzie, who was knighted in 1929, set up the Institute of Anatomical Research in 1920 on 32 hectares (78 acres), formerly part of the Aboriginal reserve known as Coranderrk. The reserve passed to the Healesville Council in c. 1927, and officially opened as the Sir Colin MacKenzie Sanctuary on 30 May 1934. The first platypus bred in captivity was born in the sanctuary in 1943, under the direction of David Fleay.

The sanctuary has been managed by the Victorian Zoological Parks and Gardens Board since 27 June 1978.

In 2009, the sanctuary was threatened by the Black Saturday bushfires, and the threatened were evacuated to the Melbourne Zoo.

In 2025, the Healesville Sanctuary opened the Australian Platypus Conservation Centre, a dedicated facility for the rehabilitation and release of injured or sick platypuses. The centre includes climate-controlled ponds, burrowing banks, and monitoring technology to support both recovery and research, while a future visitor experience space is planned to promote public engagement and conservation awareness.

=== Cottage ===
MacKenzie Cottage
- Type: Cottage

History
- Built: 1920; 106 years ago
- Built by: Jim (Scotty) Anderson; Tom Smith
- Built for: Professor Colin MacKenzie

Site notes
- Material: Weatherboard

Victorian Heritage Register
- Official name: MacKenzie Cottage, Healesville Sanctuary
- Type: Registered place
- Designated: 7 January 1999
- Reference no.: H1767
- Heritage overlay no.: HO103
- Categories: Residential buildings (private); Science

Register of the National Estate
- Official name: MacKenzie Cottage
- Type: Defunct register
- Designated: undated
- Reference no.: 101634

The MacKenzie Cottage, originally a six-roomed weatherboard building, was built in c. 1920 by local builders Jim (Scotty) Anderson and Tom Smith as a caretaker's cottage for the medical research field station established by MacKenzie. In 1934, the field station became the Sir Colin MacKenzie Sanctuary and now known simply as the Healesville Sanctuary. The cottage is the only remnant of the early years of the sanctuary. For many years it was used as a residence by successive directors and it has undergone some internal alteration and substantial additions at the rear.

== Animals and exhibits ==
Animals of the night

- Agile antechinus, Australian green tree frog, barn owl, bilby, eastern quoll, feathertail glider, golden spiny-tailed gecko, Leadbeater's possum, long-nosed potoroo, marbled velvet gecko, mountain pygmy-possum, northern quoll, Peron's tree frog, Rufous bettong, smoky mouse, smooth knob-tailed gecko, spinifex hopping-mouse, squirrel glider, and sugar glider

Aviaries

Birds of the bush

- Eastern whipbird, fan-tailed cuckoo, orange-bellied parrot, princess parrot, rose-crowned fruit-dove, and swift parrot

Gang-gang

- Gang-gang cockatoo and bush stone-curlew

Larger wetlands

- Australasian shoveller, black swan, blue-billed duck, darter, freckled duck, great cormorant, great egret, grey teal, little pied cormorant, magpie goose, pied cormorant, pied heron, plumed whistling-duck, Radjah shelduck, royal spoonbill, straw-necked ibis, and white-faced heron

Lyrebird forest

- Australian king parrot, bell miner, brush bronzewing, Pacific emerald dove, satin bowerbird, superb fairy-wren, superb lyrebird, topknot pigeon, white-headed pigeon, white-naped honeyeater, and Wonga pigeon

Parrots

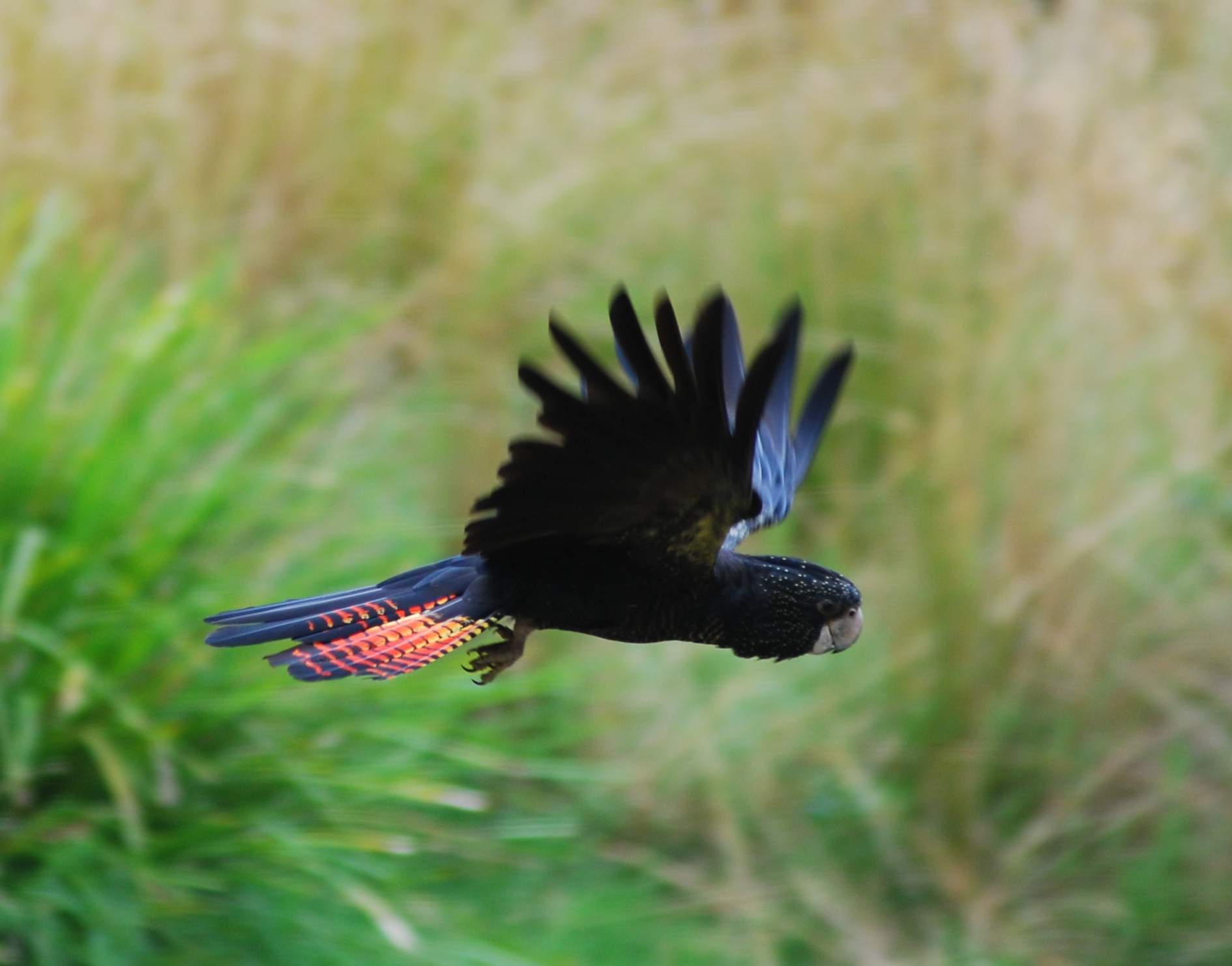
Red-tailed black cockatoo

- Budgerigar, eclectus parrot, Major Mitchell's cockatoo, red-tailed black cockatoo, Australian brush-turkey, black-faced cuckoo-shrike, brush bronzewing, pacific emerald dove, white-headed pigeon, Wonga pigeon, and zebra finch

Wetlands

- Cattle egret, glossy ibis, and yellow-billed spoonbill

Woodlands

- Common bronzewing, crested pigeon, eastern yellow robin, musk lorikeet, painted buttonquail, peaceful dove, purple-crowned lorikeet, sacred kingfisher, satin bowerbird, variegated fairy-wren, and white-browed woodswallow
Flying foxes area

- Black-winged stilt and grey-headed flying-fox

General exhibits

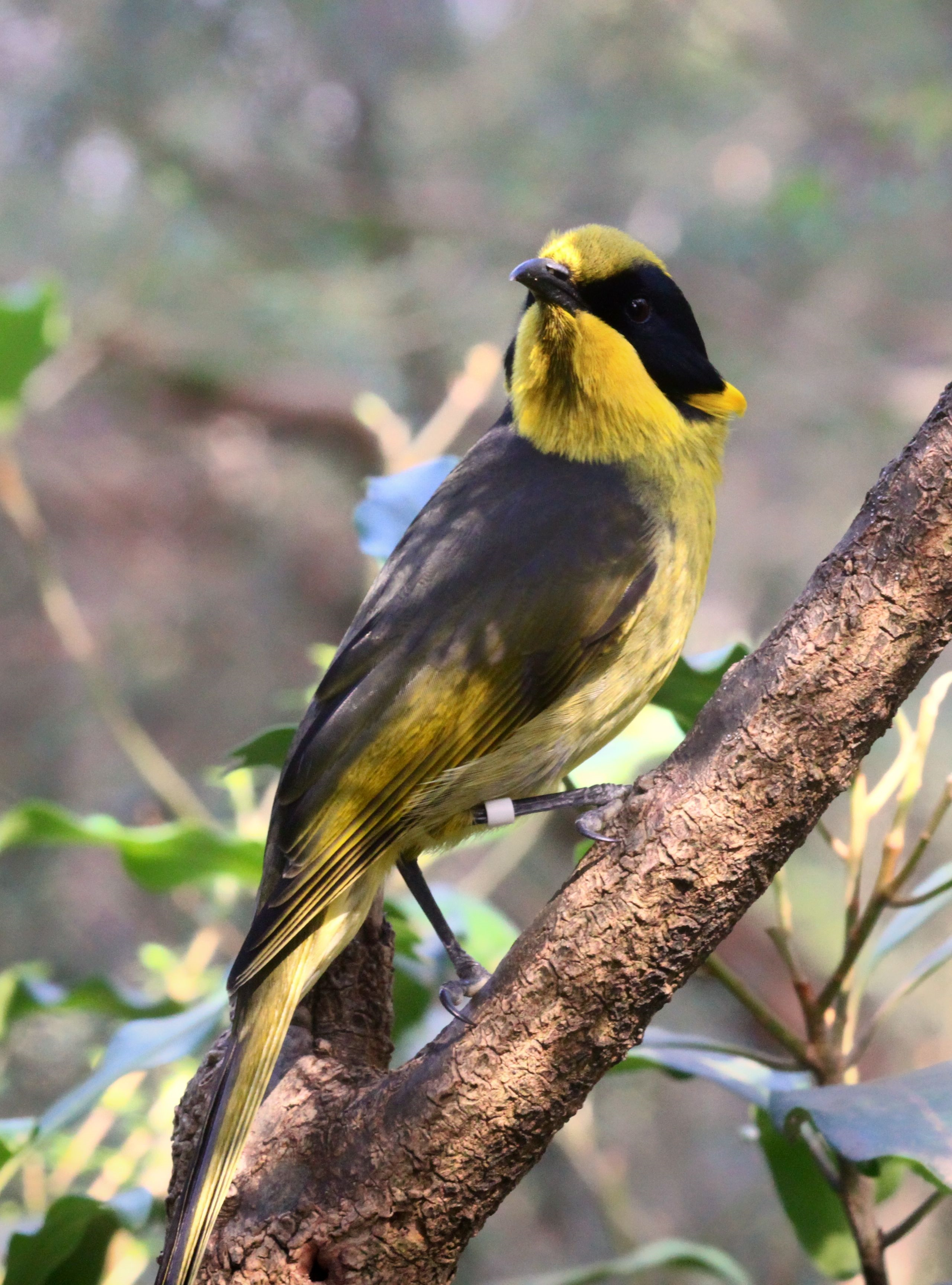
Helmeted honeyeater (captive bred)

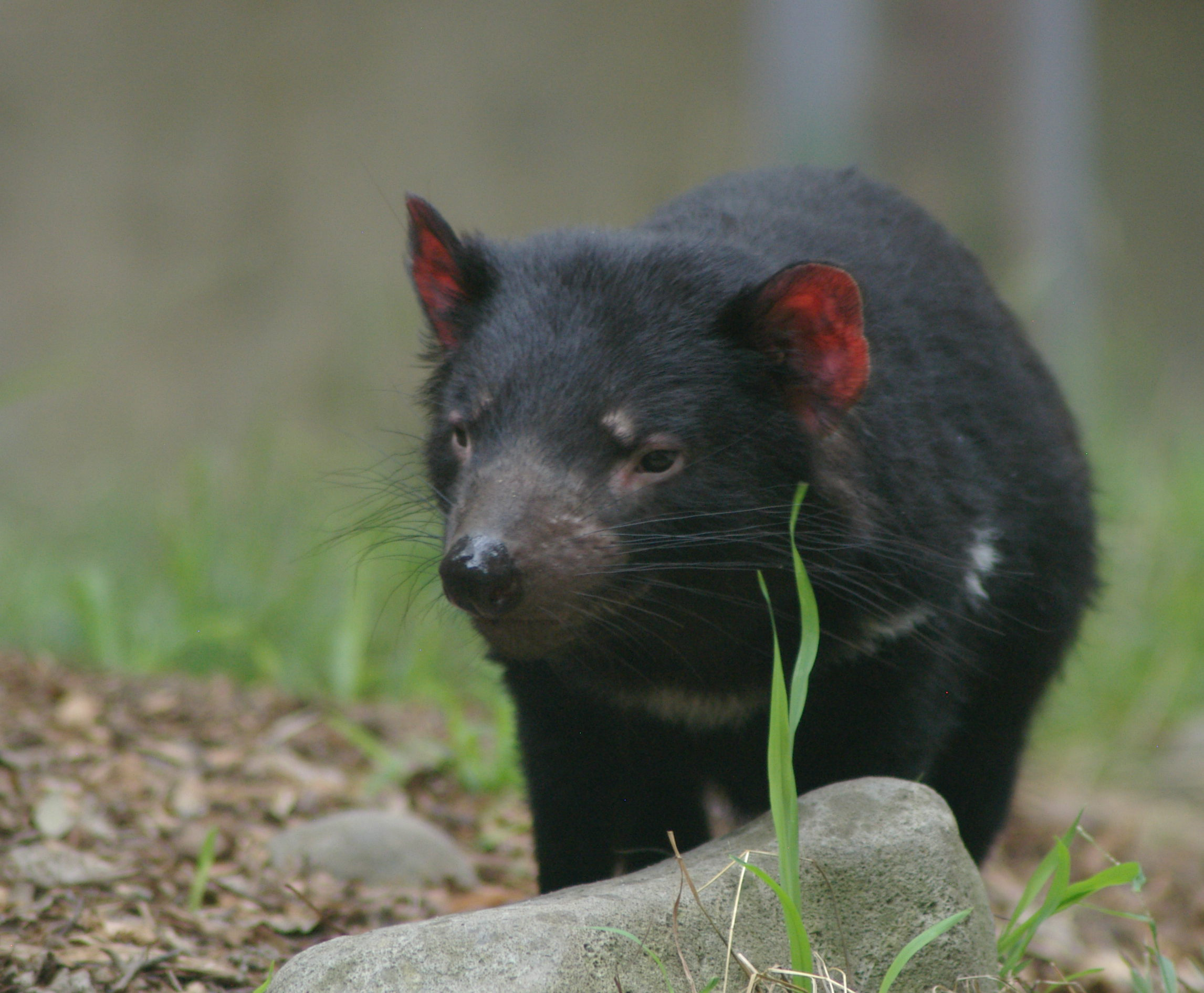
Tasmanian devil

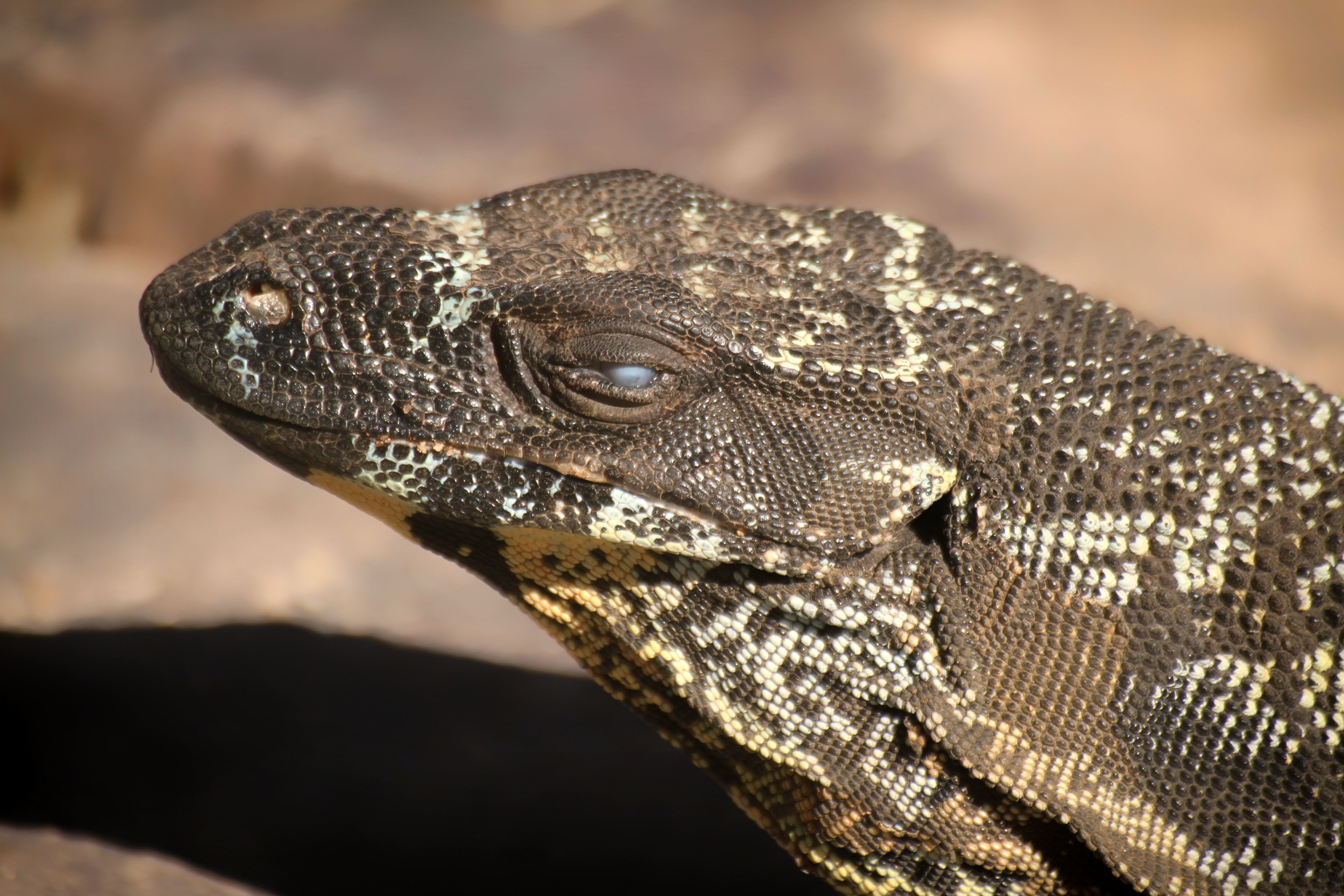
Lace monitor

- Apostlebird, common death adder, dingo, eastern barn owl, eastern blue-tongued lizard, emu, helmeted honeyeater, jacky lizard, lace monitor, laughing kookaburra, powerful owl, ridge-tailed monitor, spotted-tailed quoll, Tasmanian devil, and wedge-tailed eagle

Kangaroos

- Red kangaroo, western grey kangaroo, and Goodfellow's tree-kangaroo

Koalas area

- Koala, Parma wallaby, short-beaked echidna, and Tasmanian pademelon

Platypusary

- Common yabby, Macquarie perch, Murray crayfish, platypus, short-finned eel, and southern pygmy perch

Reptiles

- Broad-headed snake, brown tree snake, Chappell Island tiger snake, coastal taipan, eastern bearded dragon, eastern blue-tongued lizard, eastern brown snake, eastern water skink, freshwater crocodile, frill-necked lizard, green tree frog, Guthega skink, mangrove monitor, Mertens' water monitor, painted turtle, pink-tongued lizard, red-bellied black snake, rusty desert monitor, and spotted tree monitor

Wallabies

- Parma wallaby, red-necked wallaby, and swamp wallaby

Rock-wallabies

- Australian pelican, Australian white ibis, black swan, brush-tailed rock-wallaby, dusky moorhen, magpie goose, Pacific black duck, and purple swamphen
Wombat closeup

- Bare-nosed wombat, brolga, and short-beaked echidna

== See also ==
- Lists of animals of Australia
- List of zoos in Australia
- List of places on the Victorian Heritage Register in the Shire of Yarra Ranges
