= Alita Fahey =

Australian TV actress and reporter

Alita Fahey is an Australian former TV actress and reporter who appeared on Simon Townsend's Wonder World (Network 10), The Ossie Ostrich Video Show (Nine network) and the children's show Antenna (ABC). She also had roles on The Restless Years and Sons and Daughters and The Boy in the Bush (ABC). Fahey appeared in many Australian films and commercials, has sung professionally for many years both in Australia and overseas, and is an accomplished singer/songwriter. Alita and her Husband Stephen Leigh (deceased) formed a production company called Leigh-Fahey Enterprises which specialised in children's musical entertainment and Theatre-in-Education shows for schools. She is an avid songwriter, director and musician. Her re-release of her single of the classic ballad Banks of the Ohio has been played on radio stations around the country.

== Awards ==
Fahey has won eight Canberra Country Songwriting Awards some with her co-writers teen country trio 'Brothers3', and Colin MacKenzie.

=== Tamworth Songwriters Awards ===
The Tamworth Songwriters Association (TSA) is an annual songwriting contest for original country songs, awarded in January at the Tamworth Country Music Festival. They commenced in 1986. Alita Fahey has won two awards.

Year	Nominee / work	Award	Result (wins only)
2012	"Tony's Farm" by Alita Fahey and Brothers 3	Comedy/Novelty Song of the Year	Won
2013	"I Should've Listened" by Alita Fahey	Comedy/Novelty Song of the Year	Won
2014	"Huntsman in the Harmonica" by Alita Fahey and Makirum	Comedy/Novelty Song of the Year	Won
