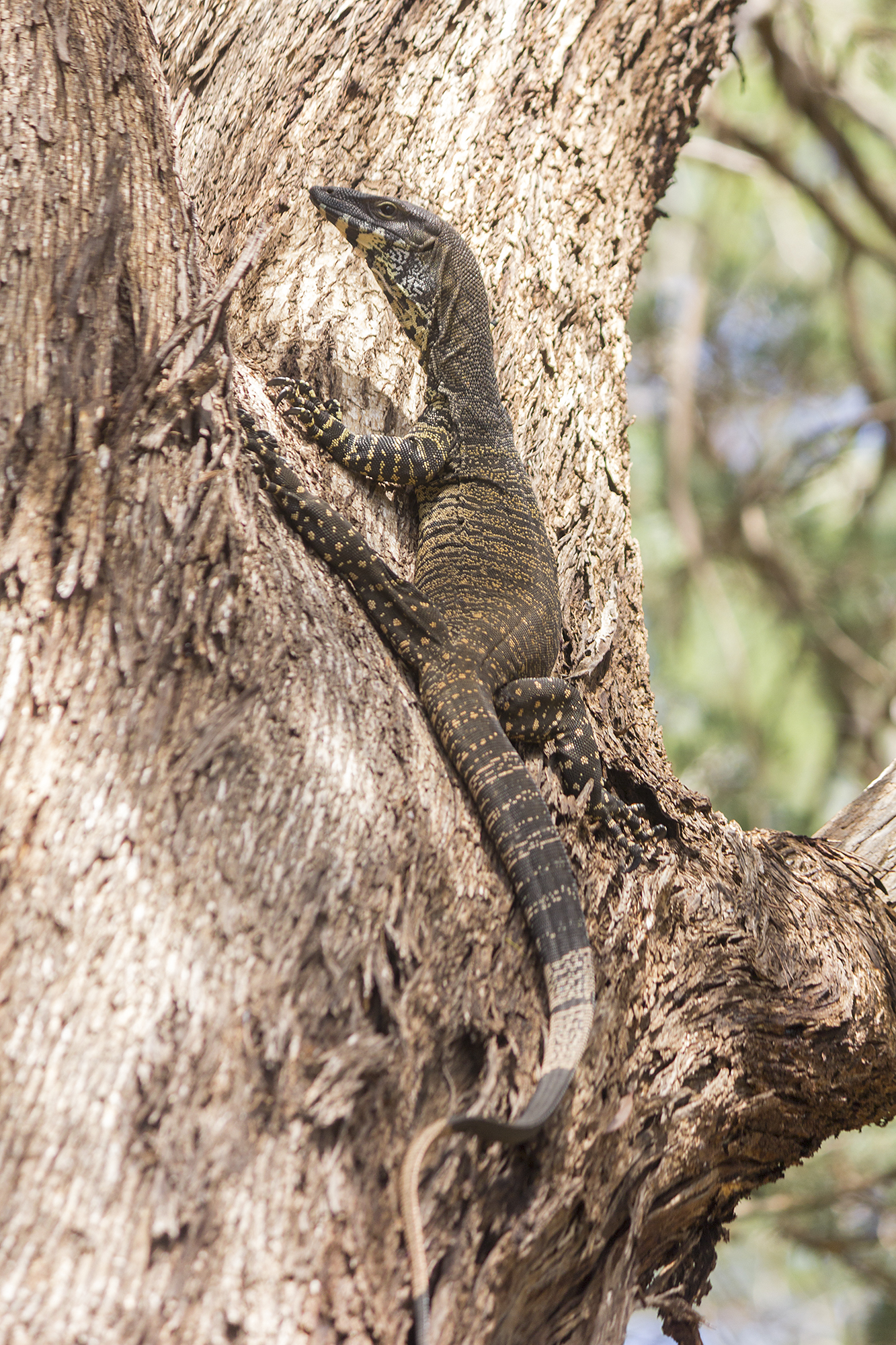

Conservation status
- Least Concern (IUCN 3.1)
- CITES Appendix II

Scientific classification
- Kingdom: Animalia
- Phylum: Chordata
- Class: Reptilia
- Order: Squamata
- Suborder: Anguimorpha
- Family: Varanidae
- Genus: Varanus
- Subgenus: Varanus
- Species: V. varius

Binomial name
- Varanus varius (White, 1790)
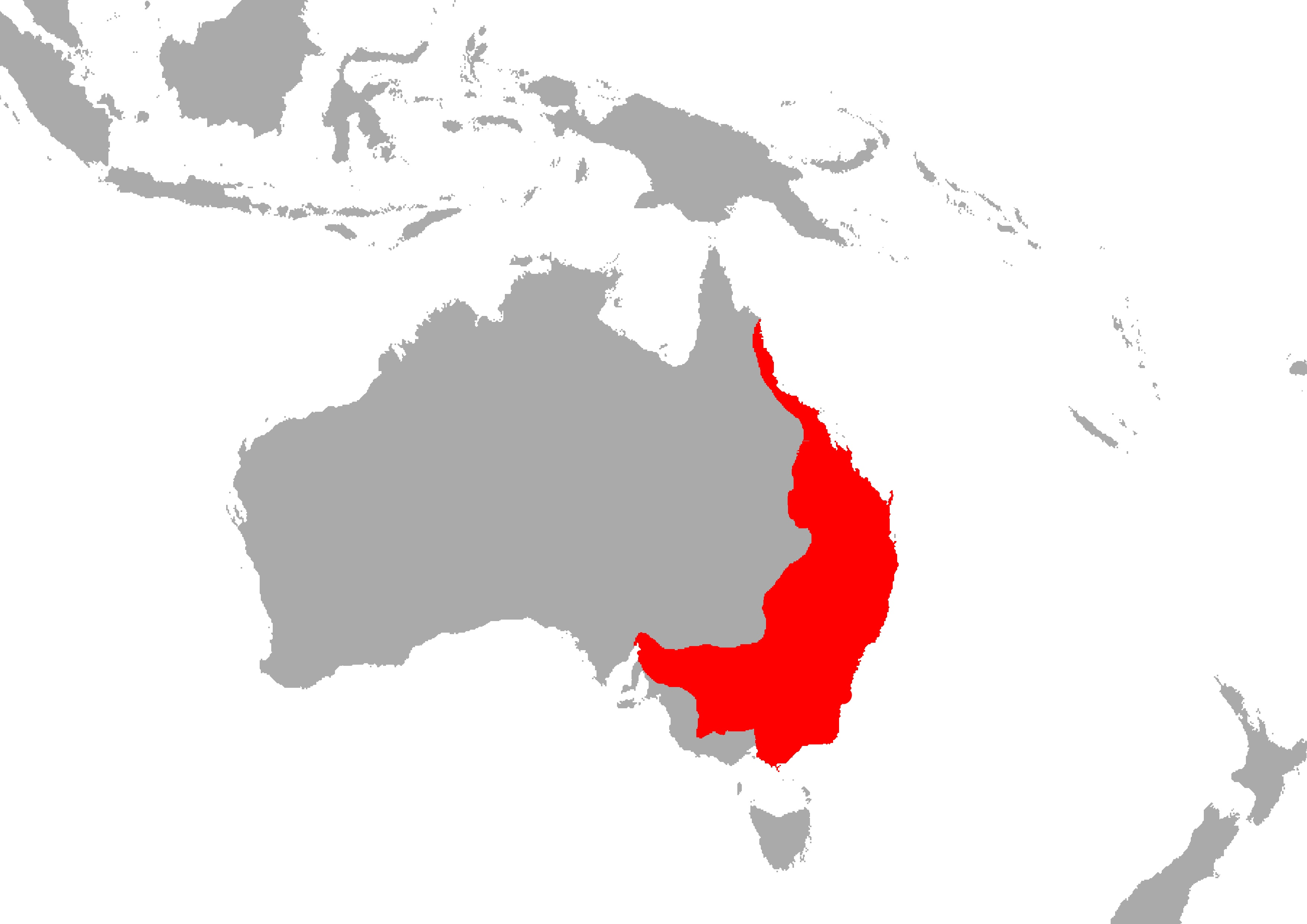

Synonyms
- Lacerta varia White, 1790; Tupinambis variegatus Daudin, 1802; Varanus bellii A.M.C. Duméril & Bibron, 1836; Varanus (Hydrosaurus) mustelinus de Borre, A.P. 1870

= Lace monitor =

Species of lizard

The lace monitor (Varanus varius), also known as the tree goanna, is a member of the monitor lizard family native to eastern Australia. A large lizard, it can reach 2 metres (6.6 ft) in total length and 14 kilograms (31 lb) in weight. The lace monitor is considered to be a least-concern species according to the International Union for Conservation of Nature.

== Taxonomy ==
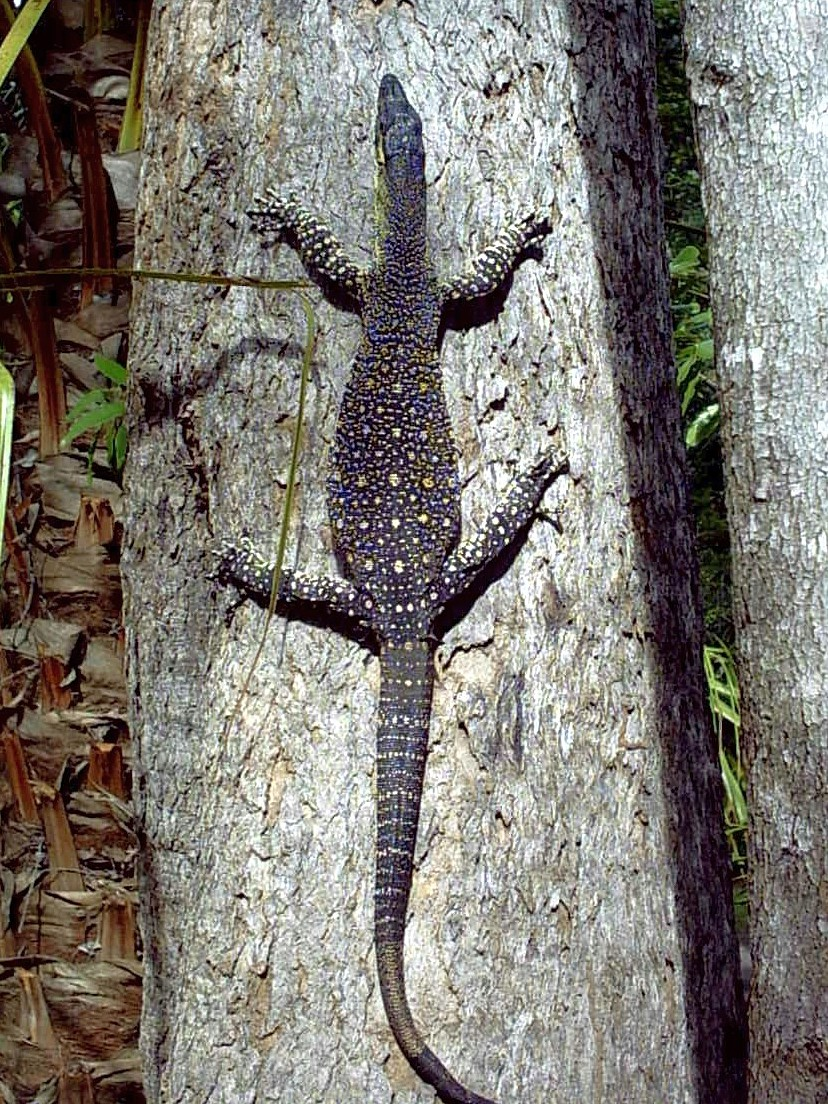
Normal phase

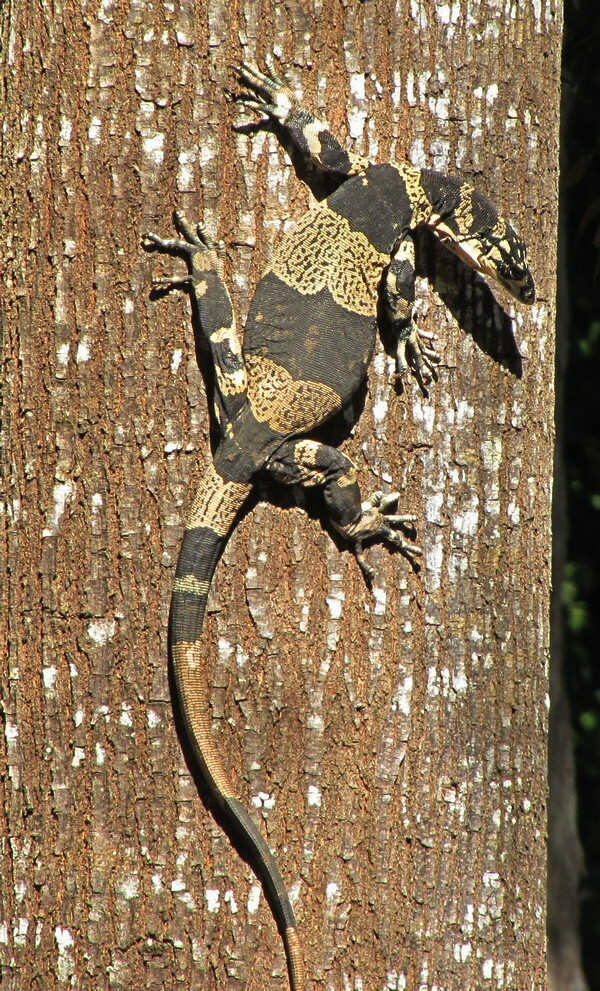
Bell's phase

John White, the surgeon-general of New South Wales, described this species as the variegated lizard (Lacerta varia) in 1790. George Shaw reported that several specimens were taken back to England. French naturalist François Marie Daudin gave it the name Tupinambis variegatus in 1802, and noted two forms. German naturalist Blasius Merrem established the genus Varanus in 1820, with V. varius as the first mentioned member set as its type species by John Edward Gray in 1827.

French zoologists André Marie Constant Duméril and Gabriel Bibron described two specimens in 1836, one in their possession and one from the collection of English zoologist Thomas Bell as Varanus bellii "Le Varan de Bell". This turned out to be a banded colour phase of the lace monitor that coexists with normal-coloured individuals, and is either autosomal dominant or codominant genetically. It is sometimes called the Bell's phase lace monitor.

The species is commonly known as lace monitor, tree goanna, or lacy. It is known as wirriga to the Eora and Darug inhabitants of the Sydney basin, and gugaa to the Wiradjuri people of southern New South Wales.

== Evolution ==
The lace monitor is monotypic; no subspecies are recognised. However, genetic analysis of its mitochondrial DNA (mtDNA) across its range revealed three main clades: a north Queensland clade separated by the Burdekin Gap from a clade spanning from southern Queensland through inland New South Wales across the Murray–Darling basin and into southeastern South Australia. This is divided from a third clade that spans coastal eastern Australia (northern New South Wales to eastern Victoria) by the McPherson Range and Great Dividing Range. This last clade is thought to have diverged from the first two clades around 2.7 million years ago, while these clades separated around 850,000 years ago.

Lace monitor fossils from the middle Pleistocene have been found in Naracoorte Caves in South Australia.

Genetic analysis of mtDNA shows the lace monitor to be the closest relative (sister taxon) of the Komodo dragon, with their common ancestor diverging from a lineage that gave rise to the crocodile monitor (Varanus salvadorii) of New Guinea. The divergence between lace monitor and Komodo dragon lineages has been calculated to have occurred around 13 million years ago, or 11.5 million years ago.

== Description ==
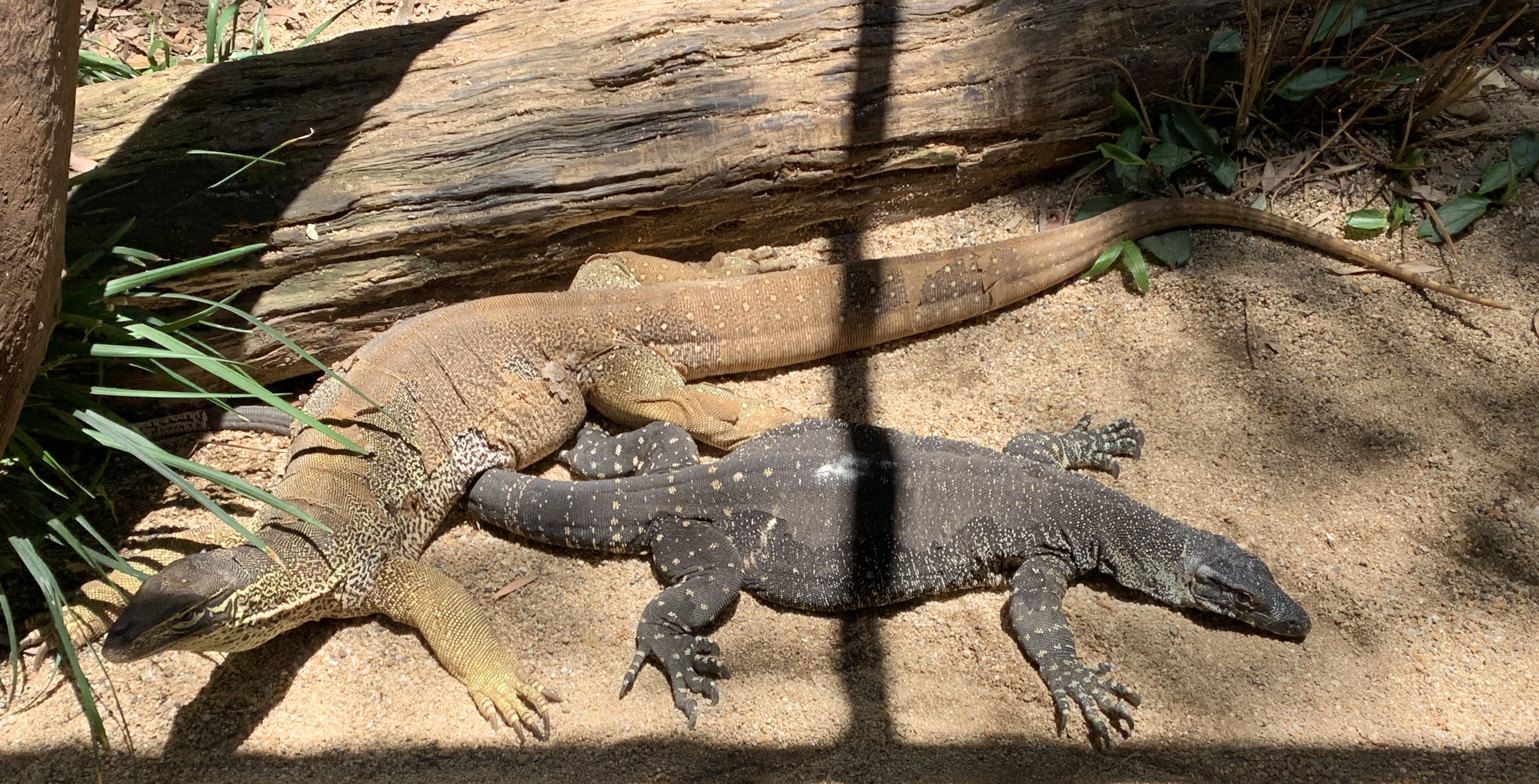
Argus monitor (left), lace monitor (right)

The second-largest monitor in Australia after the perentie, the lace monitor can reach 2 m (7 ft) in total length, or 76.5 cm snout–vent length (SVL), and weigh up to 14 kg (30 lb). The male reaches sexual maturity when it has a SVL of 41.5 cm. Females are generally smaller than males, with a maximum SVL of 57.5 cm, and becoming sexually mature at a SVL of 38.5 cm. The tail is long and slender and about 1.5 times the length of the head and body. The tail is cylindrical at its base, but becomes laterally compressed towards the tip.

Historically, it has been described as growing as much as 8 ft long. Regardless of the accuracy of these reports, lace monitors of such size likely no longer exist.

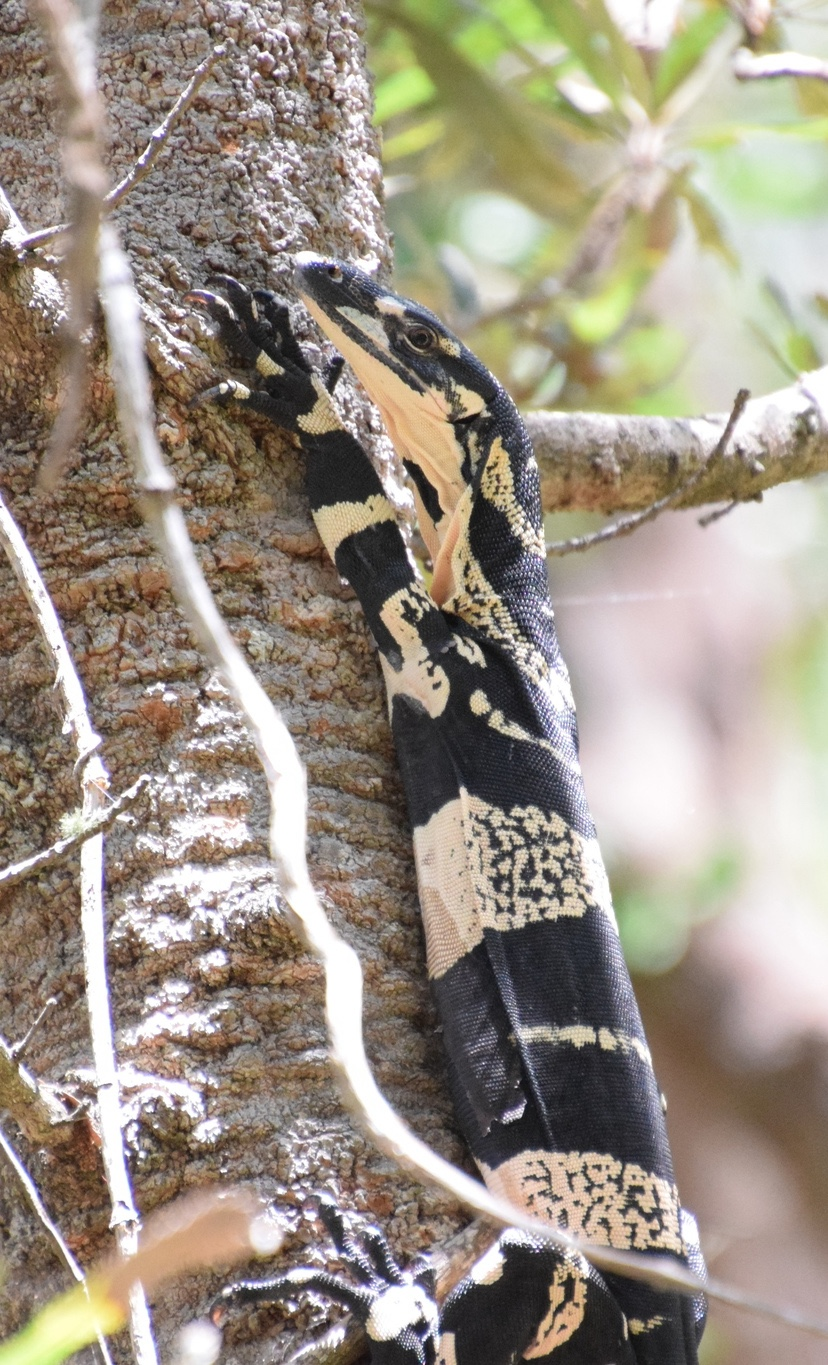
Bell's phase lace monitor

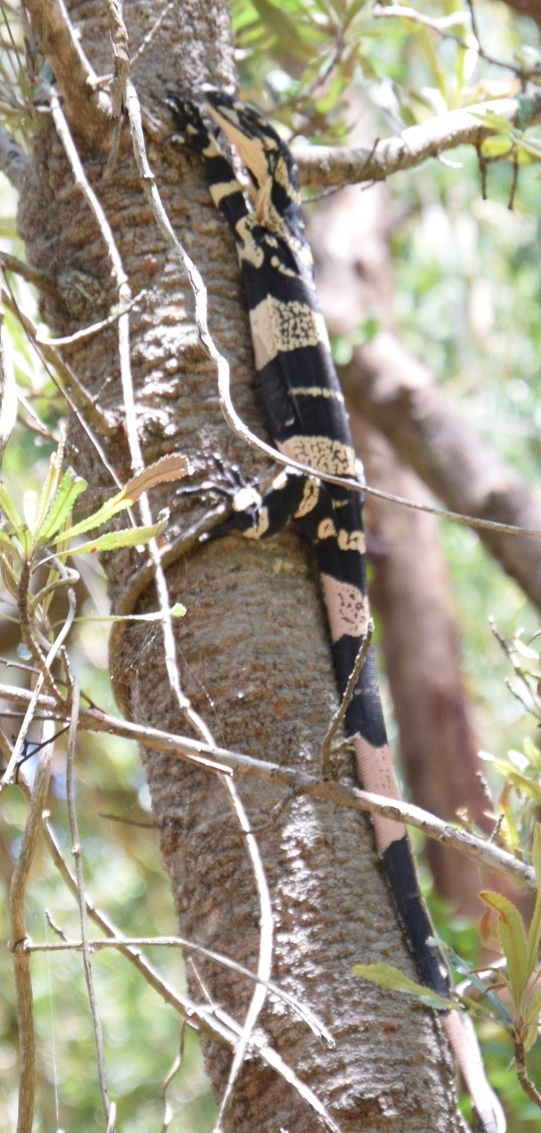

=== Patterning ===
Lace monitors are found in two forms. The main form is dark grey to dull bluish-black with numerous, scattered, cream-coloured spots. The head is black and the snout is marked with prominent black and yellow bands extending under the chin and neck. The tail has narrow black and cream bands, which are narrow and get wider towards the end of the tail. Juveniles have more defined and prominent banding, with five narrow black bands on the neck and eight bands on the body.

The other type, known as Bell's form, is typically found in west of the Great Dividing Range from Woodgate, Eidsvold, and Mitchell in Queensland to Bourke, Macksville and Port Macquarie in New South Wales. It has also been reported from Healesville, Rushworth, and Murchison in Victoria and the Flinders Ranges in South Australia. It has a base colour of yellow-brown or yellow with fine black mottling and broad, black or dark brown bands from the shoulders to the tail. The top of the head is black.

== Distribution and habitat ==
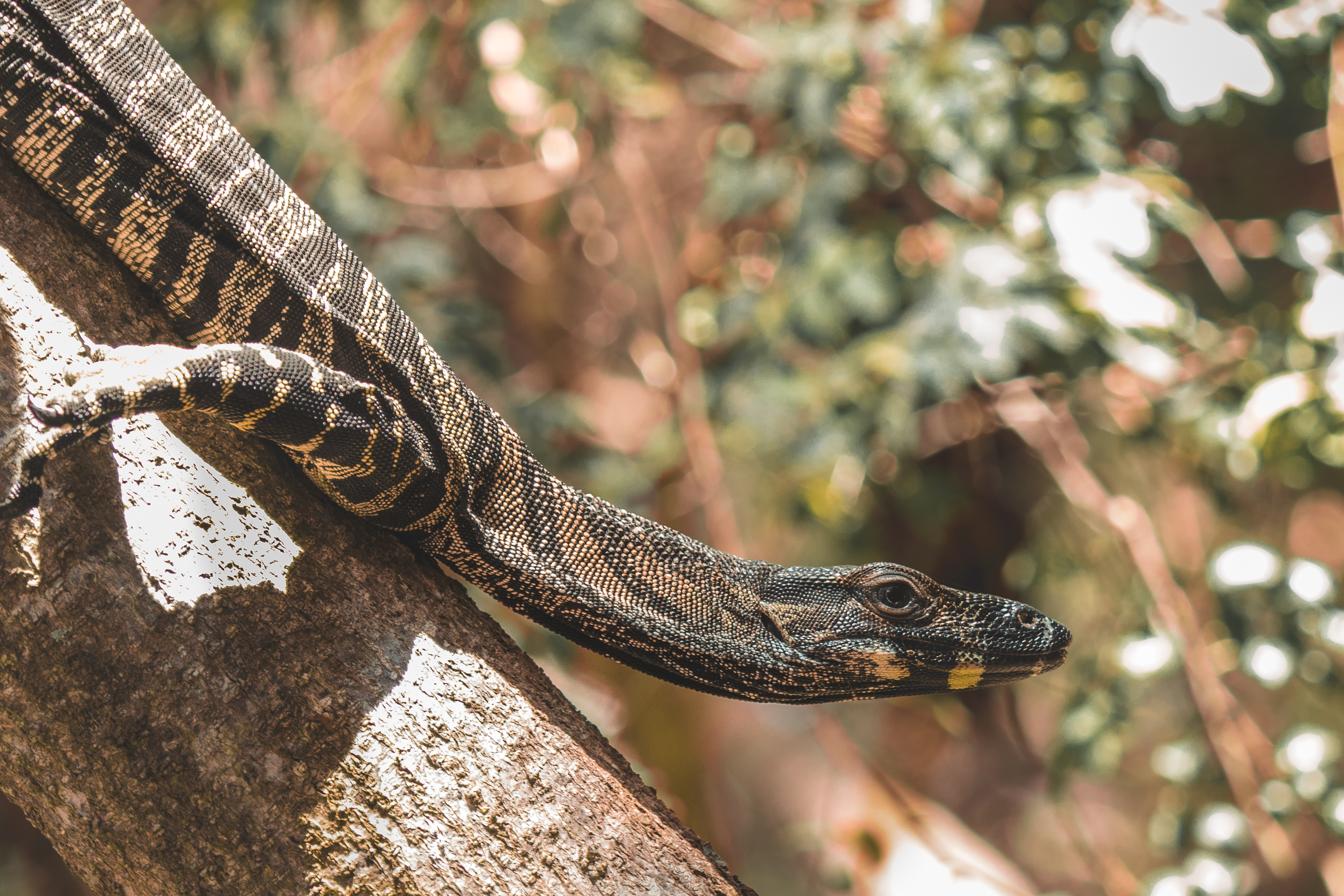
Lace monitor

These common terrestrial and often arboreal monitors are found in eastern Australia and range from Cape Bedford on Cape York Peninsula to south-eastern South Australia. They frequent both open and closed forests and forage over long distances (up to 3 km (1.9 mi) a day).

The lace monitor is considered to be a least-concern species according to the International Union for Conservation of Nature.

They are mainly active from September to May, but are inactive in cooler weather and shelter in tree hollows or under fallen trees or large rocks.

== Behaviour ==
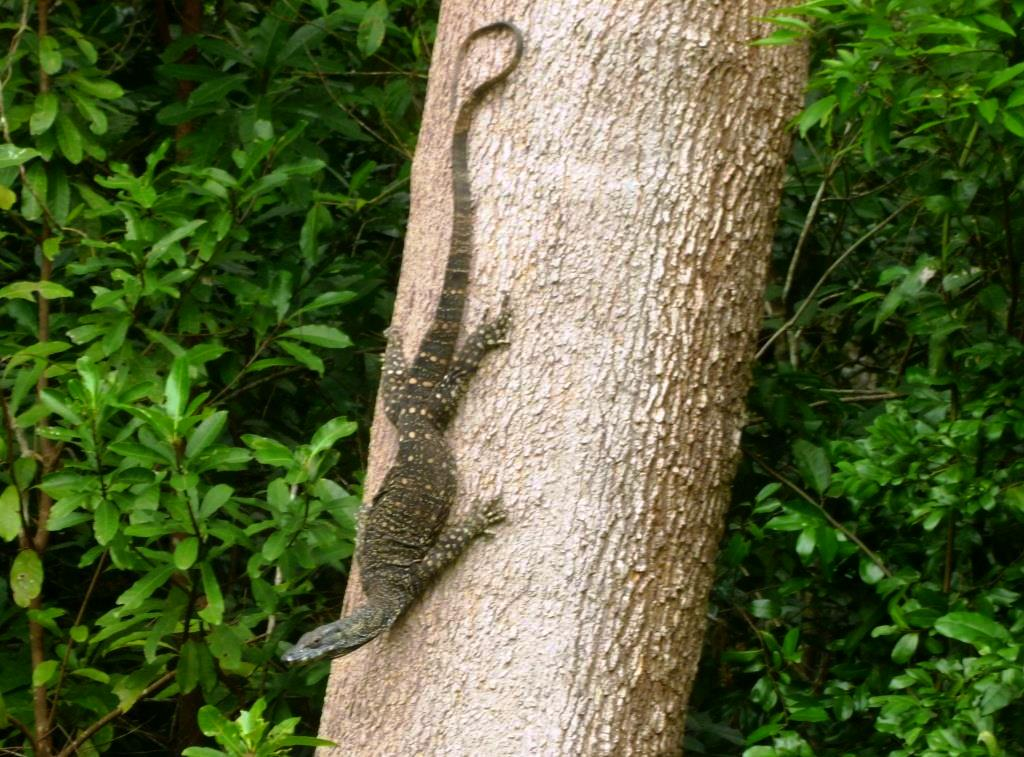
On a tree, Cooktown, Queensland

Despite its large size and mass, the lace monitor is an adept climber. One was recorded climbing a brick wall to seek shelter in a thunderstorm. Young lace monitors are even more arboreal than adults. They often spend most of their adult lives in the same area; one individual was recorded living in the same tree for years.

A field study in Burragorang, New South Wales found that males over 5 kg ranged over home territories of 65.5 ± 10.0 hectares. They moved around much less in winter.

=== Reproduction ===
In at least the temperate regions, the breeding season takes place in the summer.

Male lace monitors fight each other by grappling while standing on the hind legs in the breeding season, and up to six males may gather around a receptive female to try and court her. Mating takes several hours.

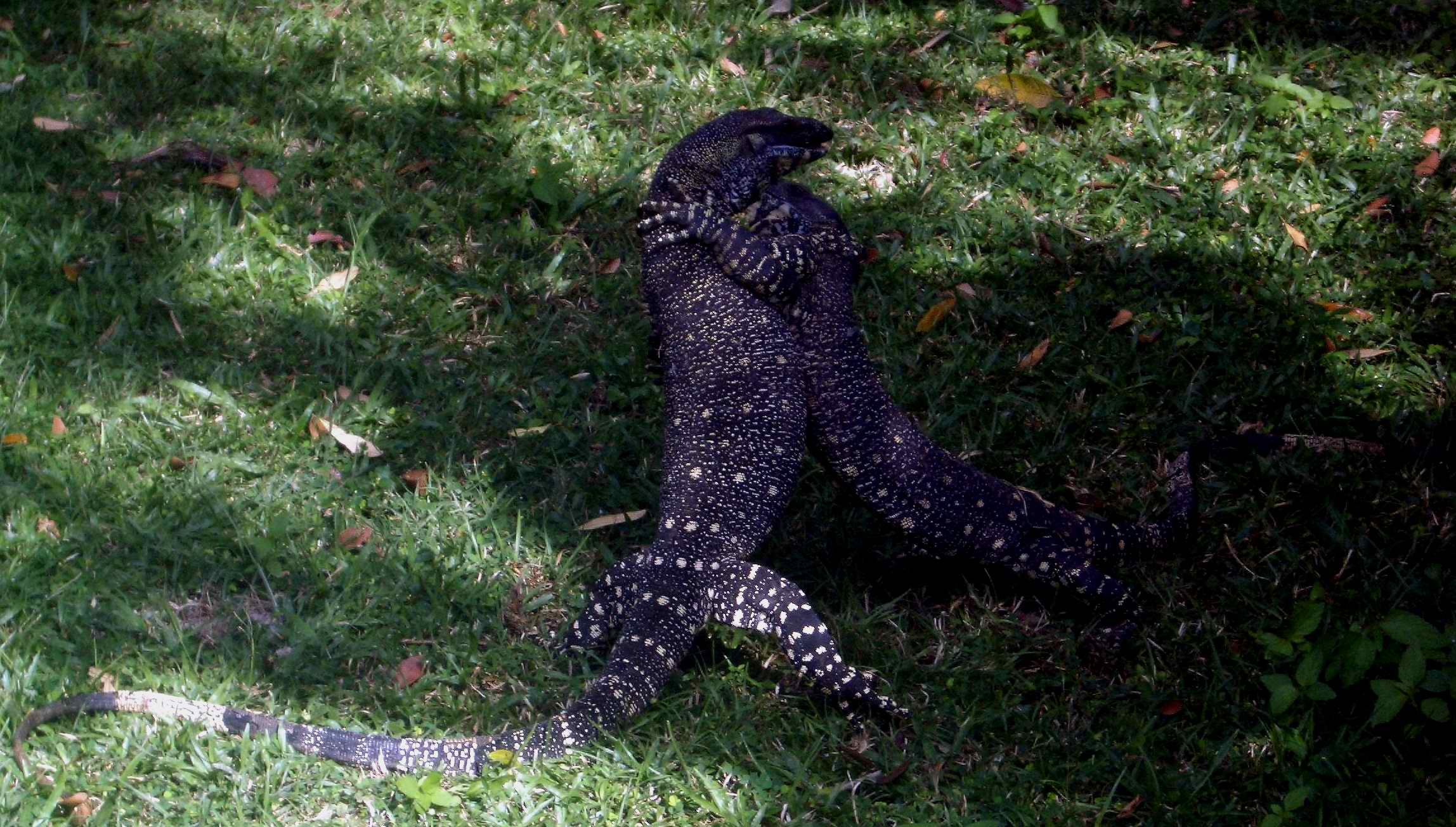
Males fighting

Females lay an average of eight eggs in active termite nests either on the ground or in the trees, although they may lay as many as 12 eggs. When such nests are in short supply, females often fight over them or lay the eggs in burrows and perhaps hollow logs. The eggs overwinter to hatch 6–7 months later. Hatchlings remain around the nest for about a week or more before leaving its vicinity. Females may return to the same termite nest to lay their next clutch of eggs. These monitors can potentially live to reach over 20 years of age.

=== Feeding ===
Lace monitors are predominantly carrion eaters, feeding on already dead carcasses of other wildlife. They consist of insects, reptiles, small mammals, birds, with eggs and young birds and mammals making up a larger part of their diet in spring and early summer. Lace monitors search for food on the ground, retreating to a nearby tree if disturbed. They also forage in areas inhabited by people, raiding chicken coops for poultry and eggs, and rummaging through unprotected domestic garbage bags and rubbish bins in picnic and recreational areas.

A 2012 study in Gippsland found that populations of lace monitors near two rubbish tips were thirty five times greater, with individuals around twice as heavy, as populations in natural forest. The lizards near rubbish tips foraged predominantly on food waste there, with a greater caloric intake. These populations had 5.3 males for each female, compared with 1.9 males per female in natural areas. Despite the apparent increase in population and size, the long-term effect of human impact on the species is unclear.

As they often swallow meat whole, they can be at risk of harm from some meat scraps; one was reported with a T-bone steak bone stuck in its throat and another with a plastic fork in its stomach. Another swallowed six golf balls that a chicken owner had placed in their coop to prompt their chickens to lay eggs.

They frequently attack the large composting nests of brushturkeys to steal their eggs, and often show injuries on their tails inflicted by male turkeys pecking at them to drive them away.

The species (particularly larger individuals) declined in numbers when the species encountered the advancing cane toad; however, lace monitors were abundant in some areas where cane toads had been established for many years. Fieldwork published in 2016 found that larger individuals were less cautious in what they ate, but all lace monitors quickly learned to avoid toads after they had been poisoned.

=== Predators ===
Lace monitors are close to the top of the food chain, though dingo packs, wedge-tailed eagles, and wild boars occasionally prey upon them.

== Venom ==
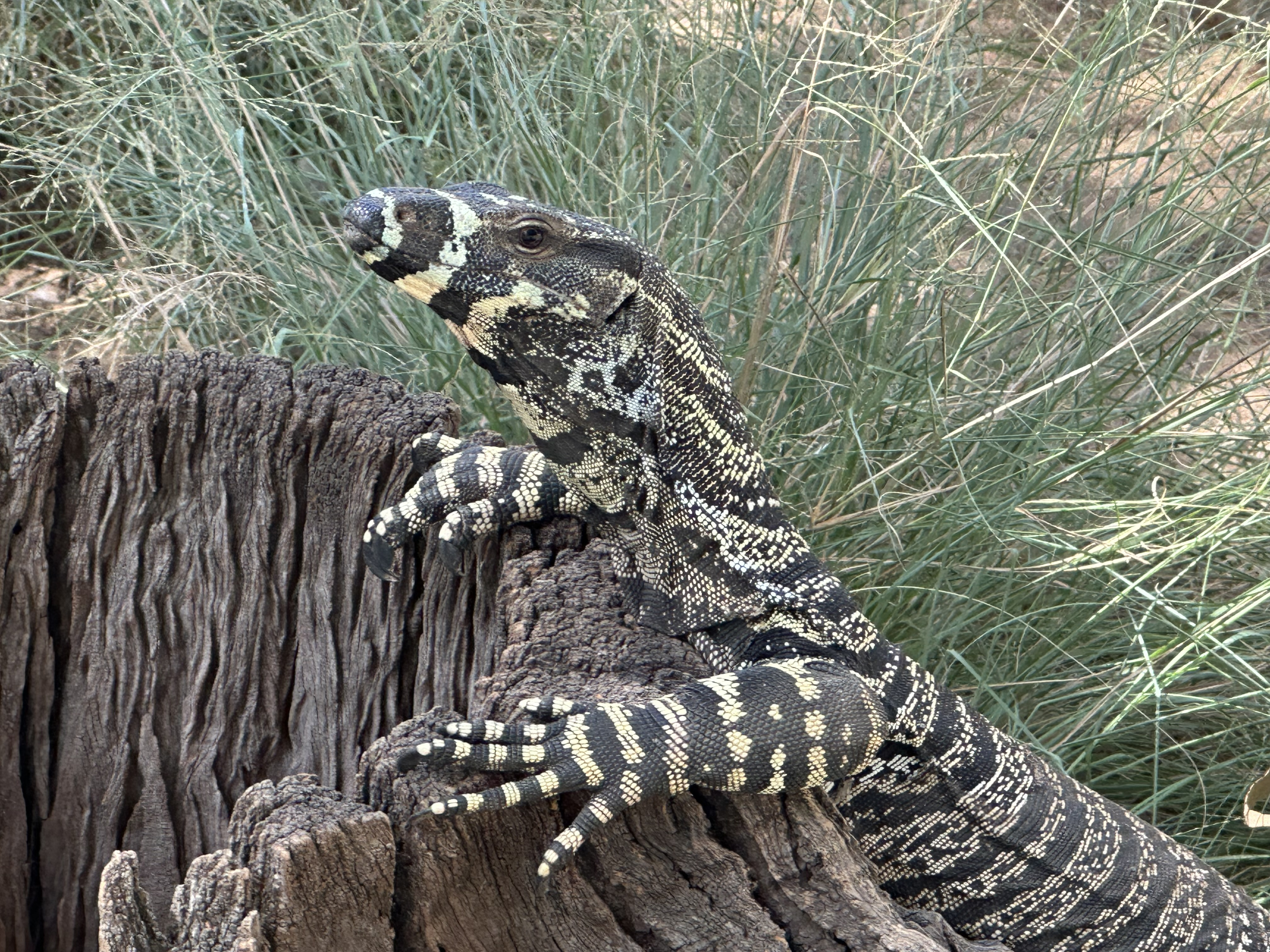
Lace monitor in Sydney, New South Wales

Venom glands in lace monitors have been confirmed. The venom is similar to that produced by snakes but not enough to cause serious harm. In late 2005, University of Melbourne researchers discovered that all monitors may be somewhat venomous. Previously, bites inflicted by monitors were thought to be prone to infection because of bacteria in their mouths, but the researchers showed that the immediate effects were more likely caused by envenomation. Bites on the hand by lace monitors have been observed to cause swelling within minutes, localised disruption of blood clotting, and shooting pain up to the elbow, which can often last for several hours.

In vitro testing showed lace monitor mouth secretion impacts on platelet aggregation, drops blood pressure and relaxes smooth muscle; the last effect mediated by an agent with the same activity as brain natriuretic peptide. Liquid chromatography/mass spectrometry found ample proteins with molecular masses of 2-4 kilodaltons (corresponding with natriuretic peptide), 15 kilodaltons (type III Phospholipase A2), and 23-25 kilodaltons (cysteine-rich secretory proteins and kallikrein) in these secretions.

Washington State University biologist Kenneth V. Kardong and toxicologists Scott A. Weinstein and Tamara L. Smith, have cautioned that labelling these species as venomous oversimplifies the diversity of oral secretions in reptiles, and overestimates the medical risk of bite victims.

== Uses ==
The lace monitor was eaten by the Wiradjuri people; local wisdom advised eating lace monitors that came down from trees as those that had eaten on the ground tasted of rotting meat. The Tharawal ate the species' eggs, collecting them in sand on riverbanks in the Nattai and Wollondilly. Goanna remains have been recovered in middens in what is now Sydney. The lace monitor is bred in captivity as an exotic pet.

== Gallery ==
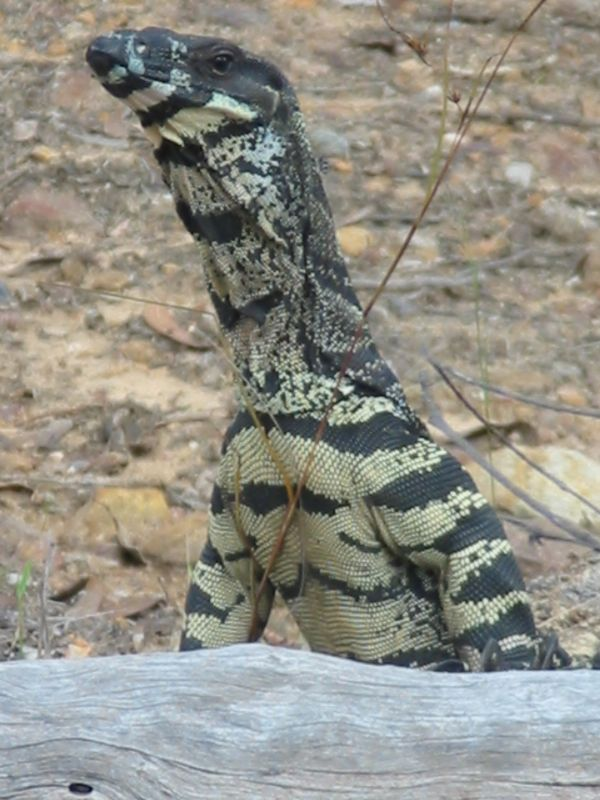
Underside markings

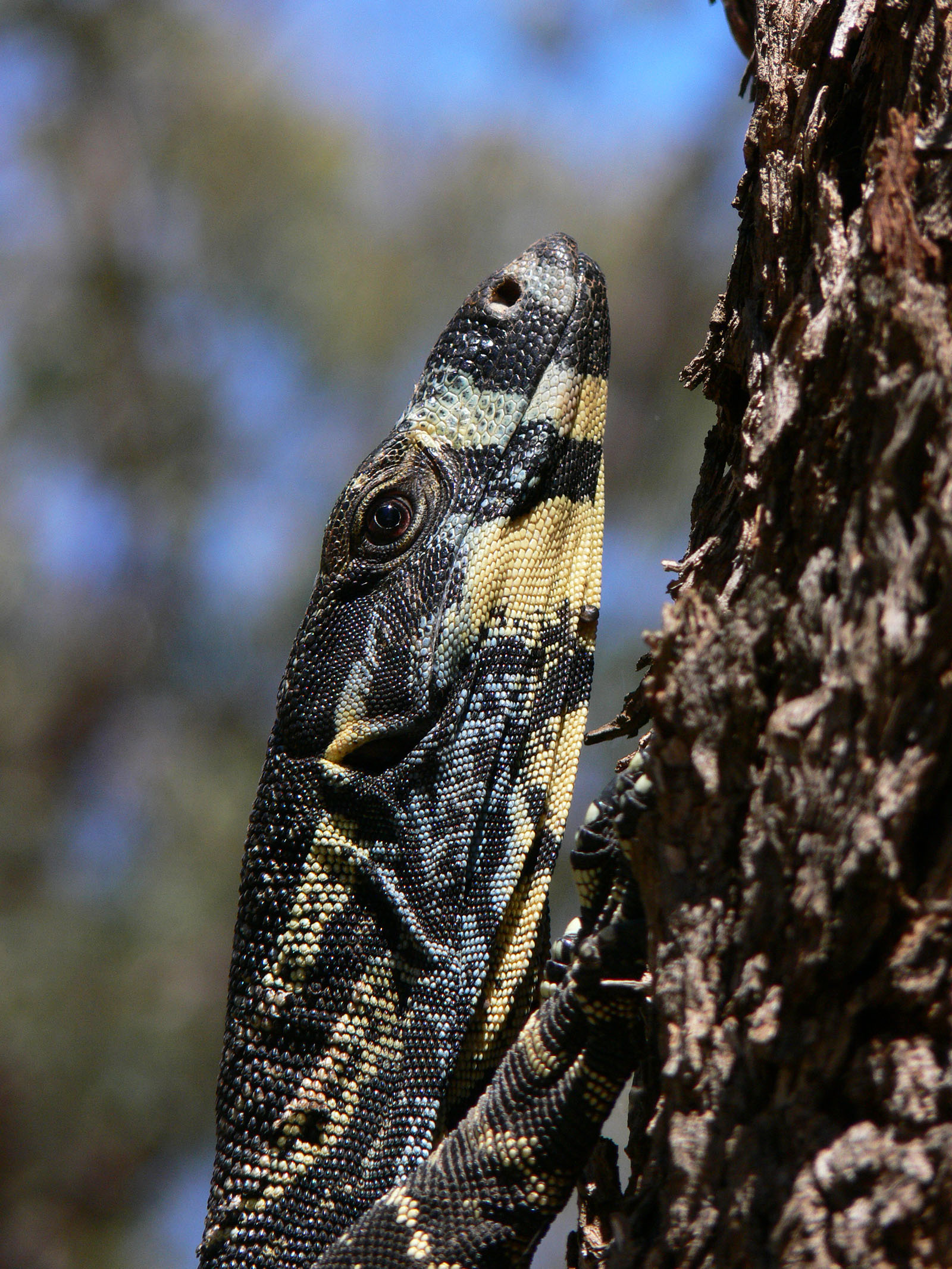
Climbing a tree

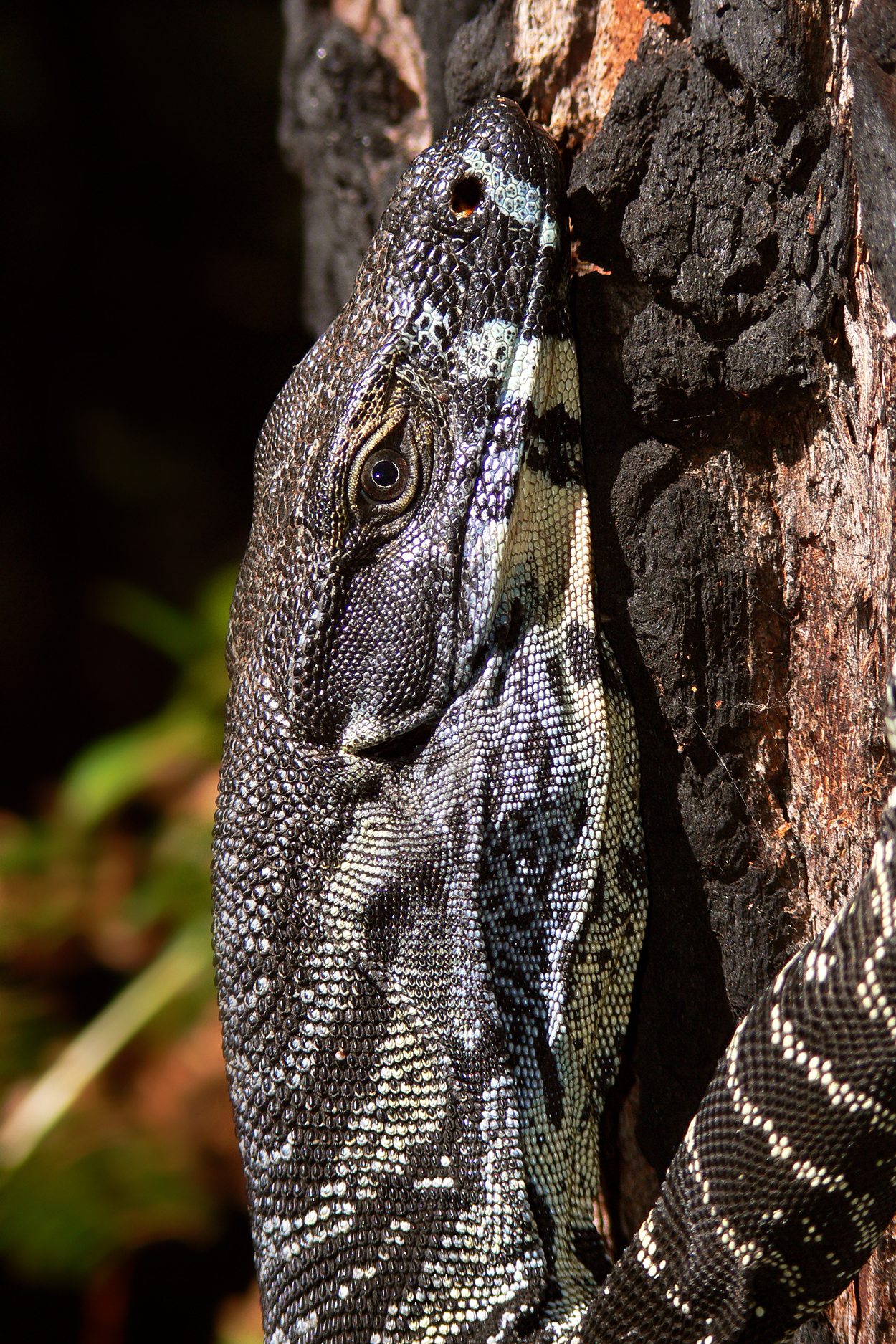
Climbing a tree

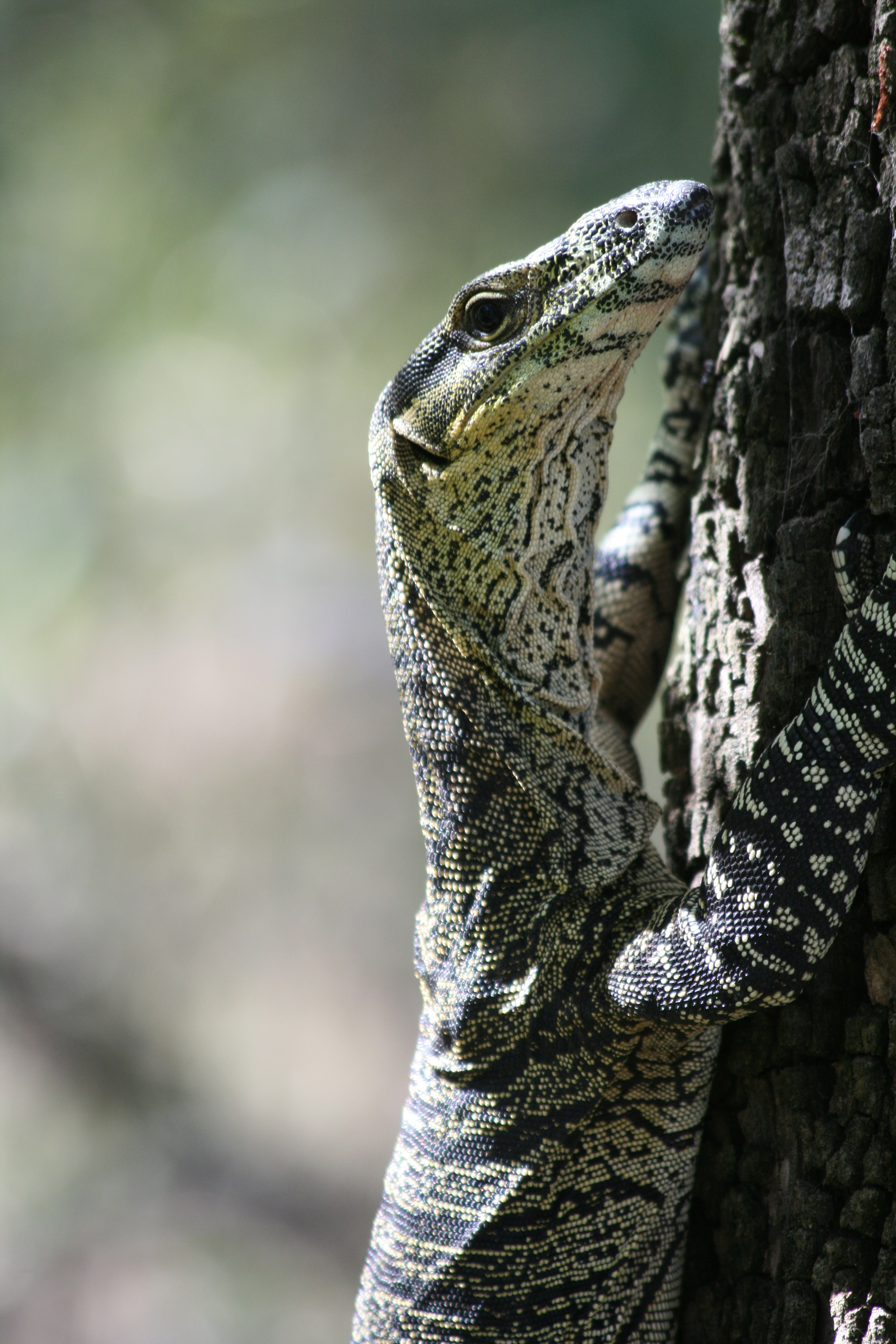
Brisbane Forest Park, Queensland

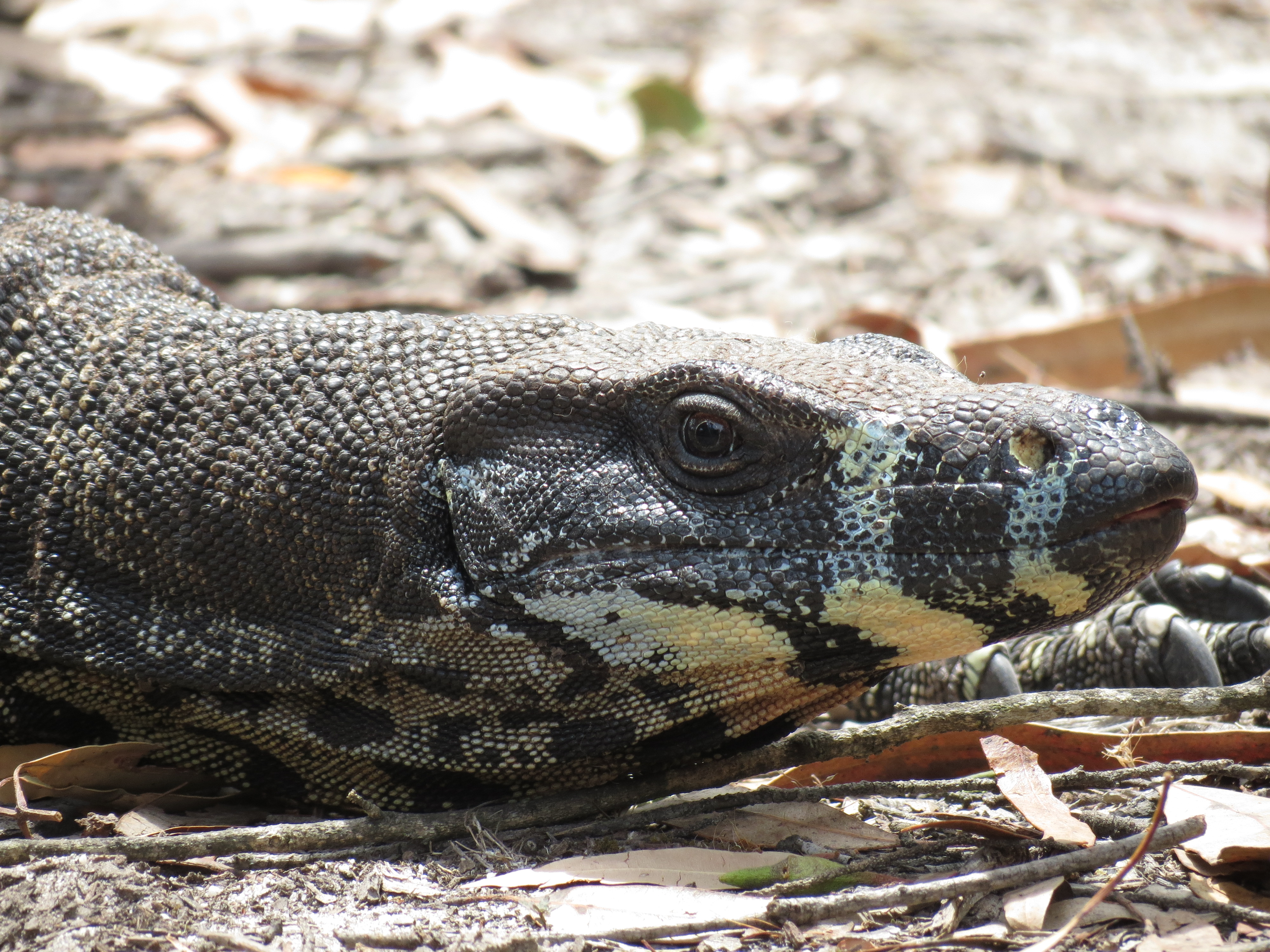
Head closeup

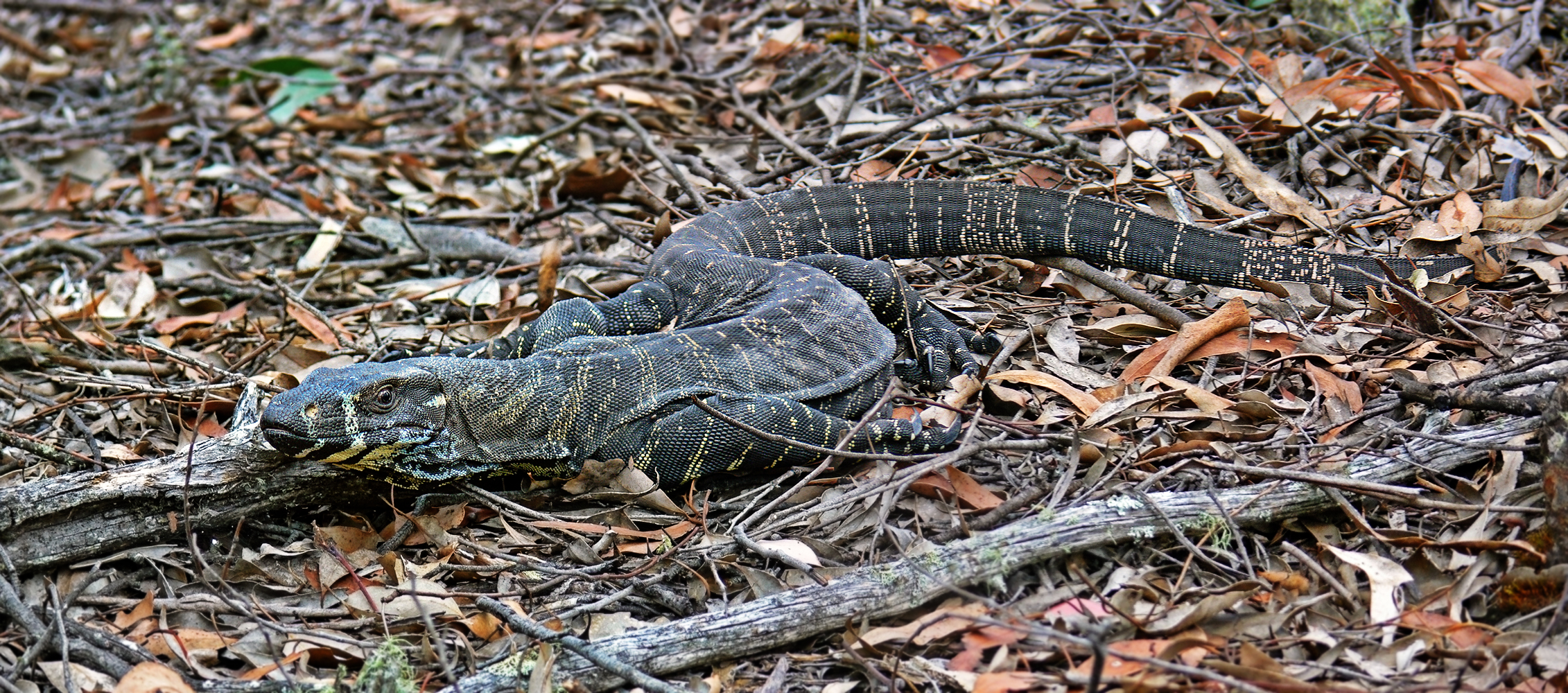
Demonstrating camouflage

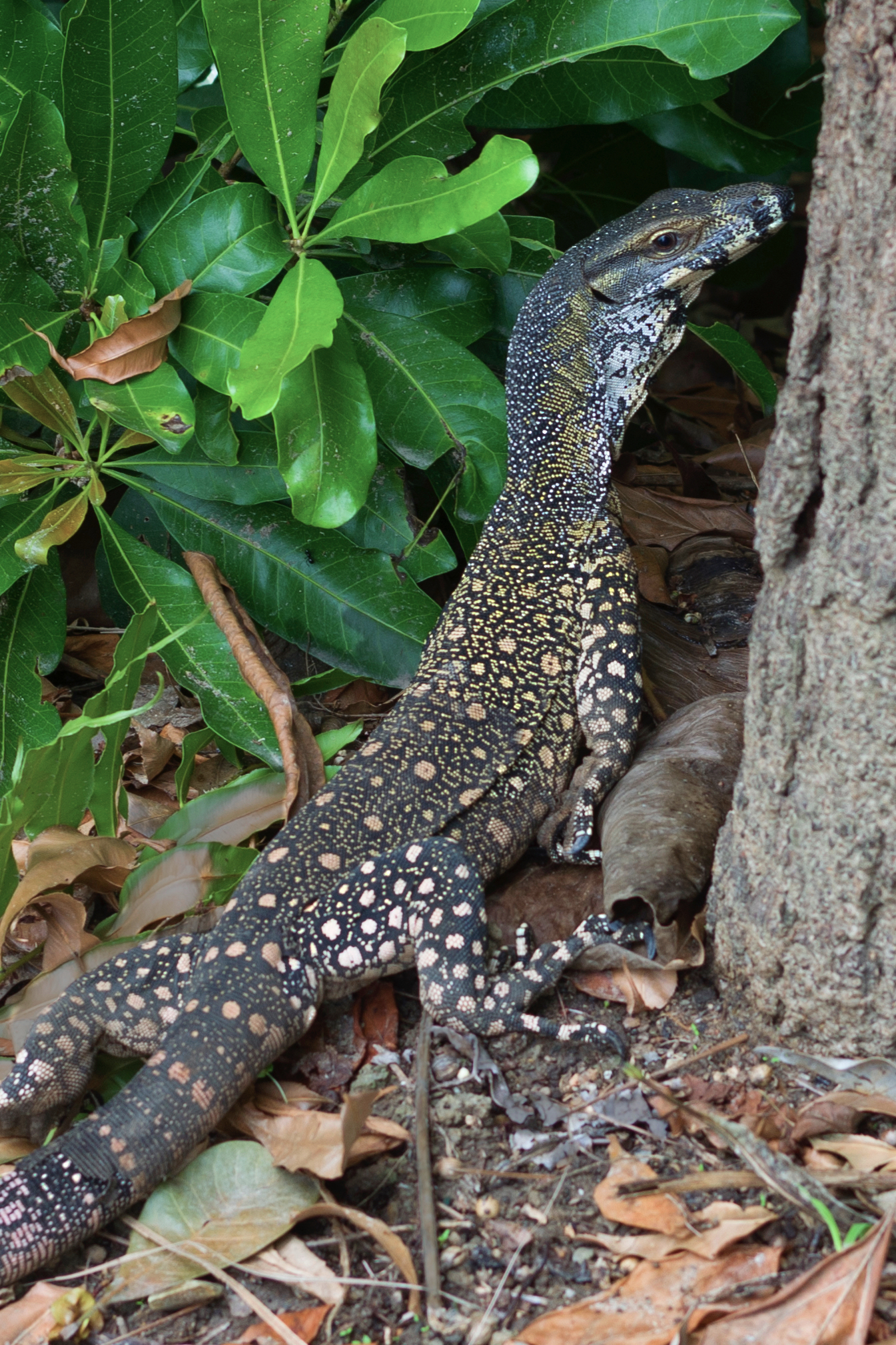
Cairns, Queensland

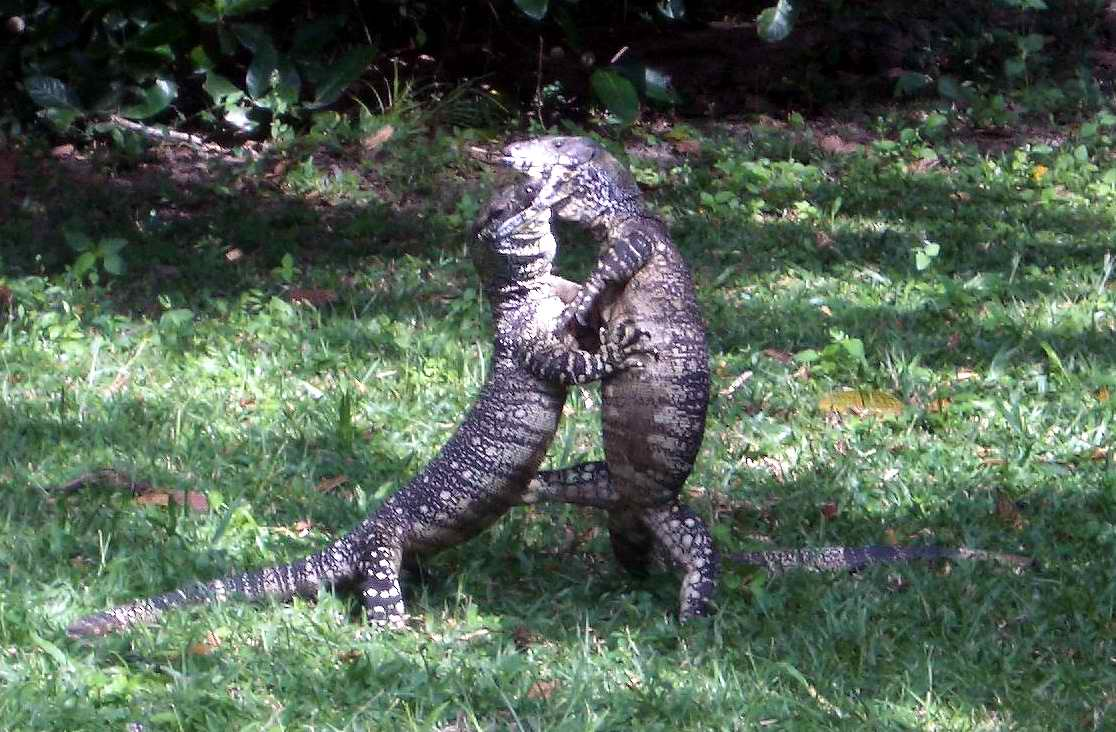
Lace monitors fighting

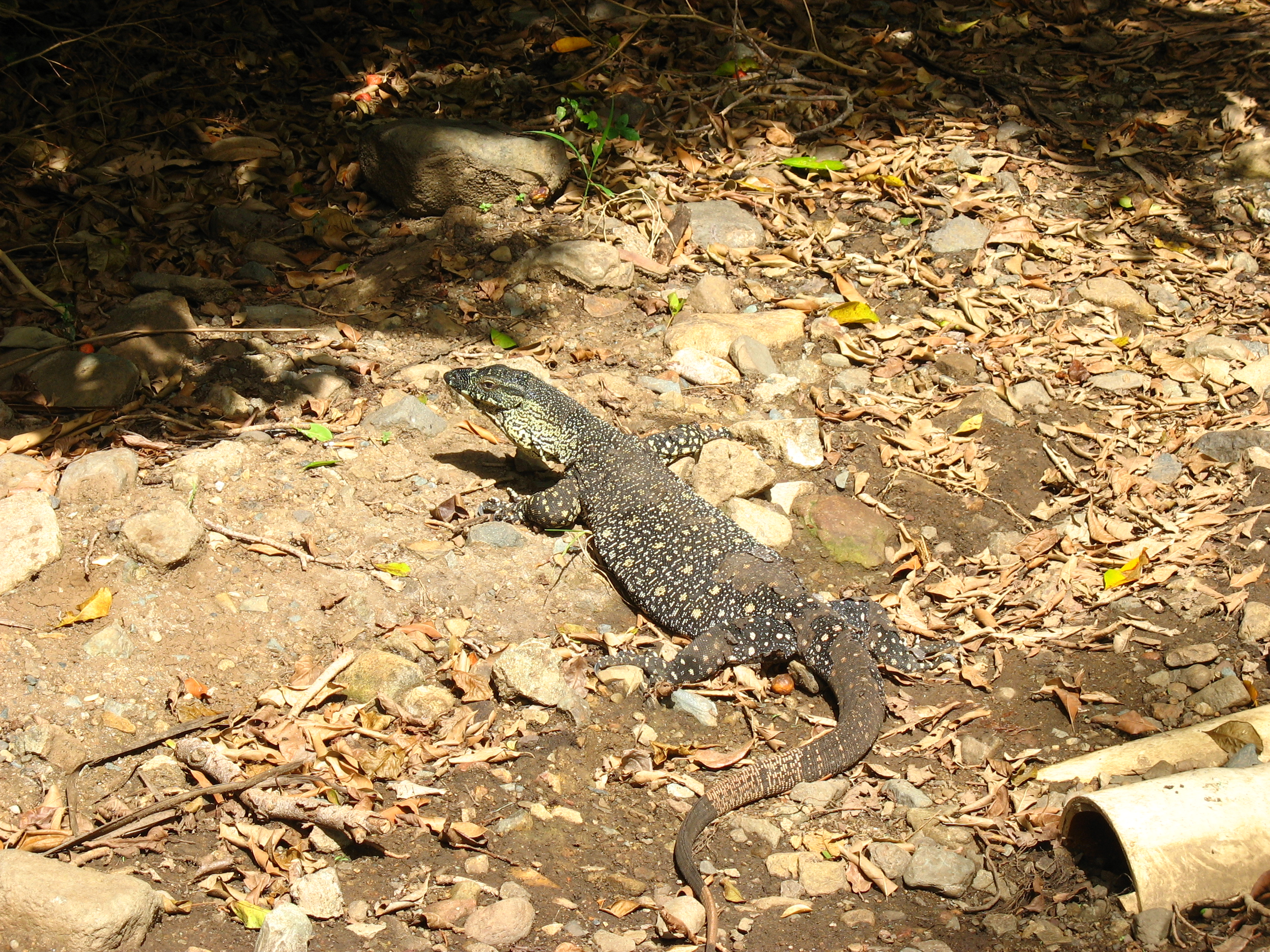
Moulting in Queensland

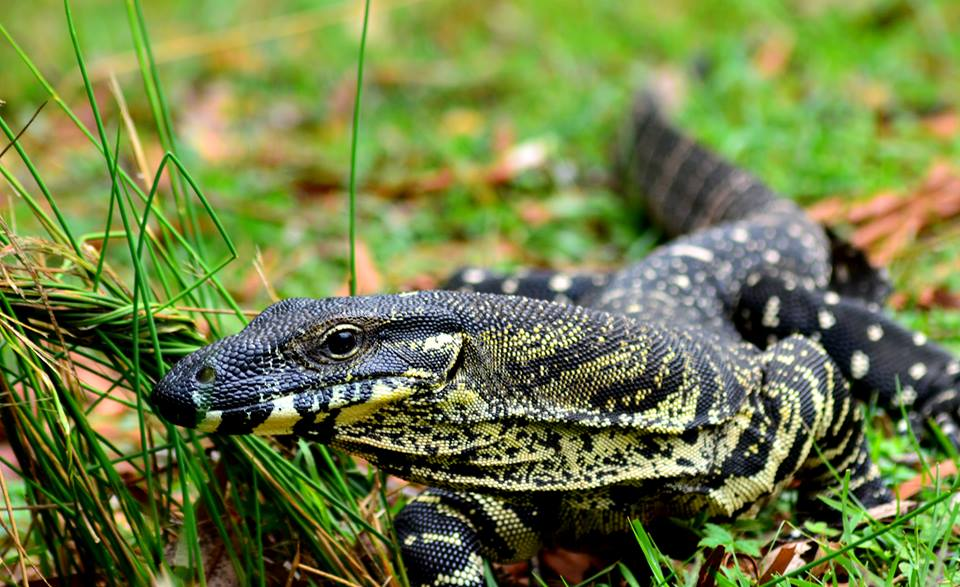
At Peacock - Richmond Range National Park

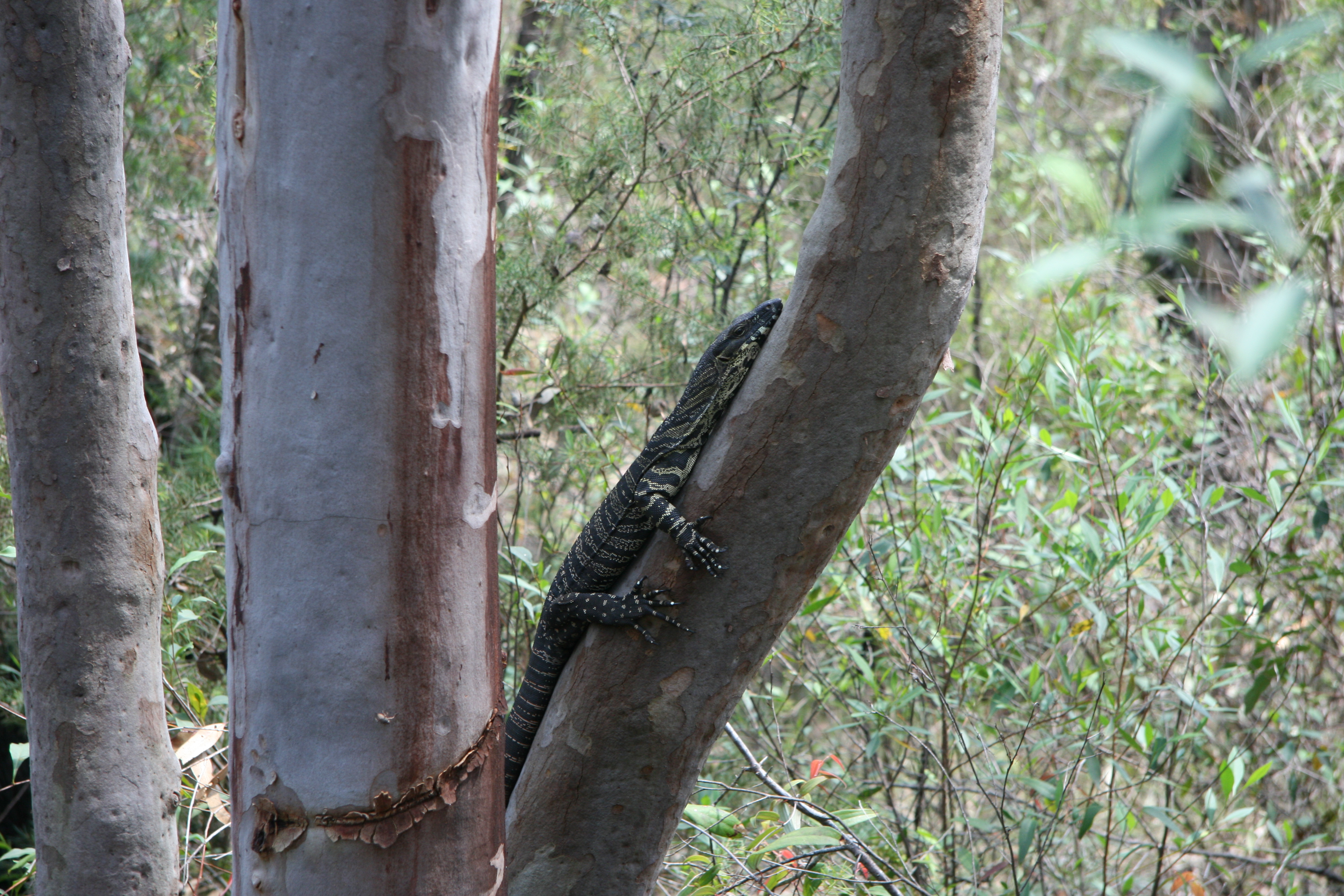
Yeramba Lagoon

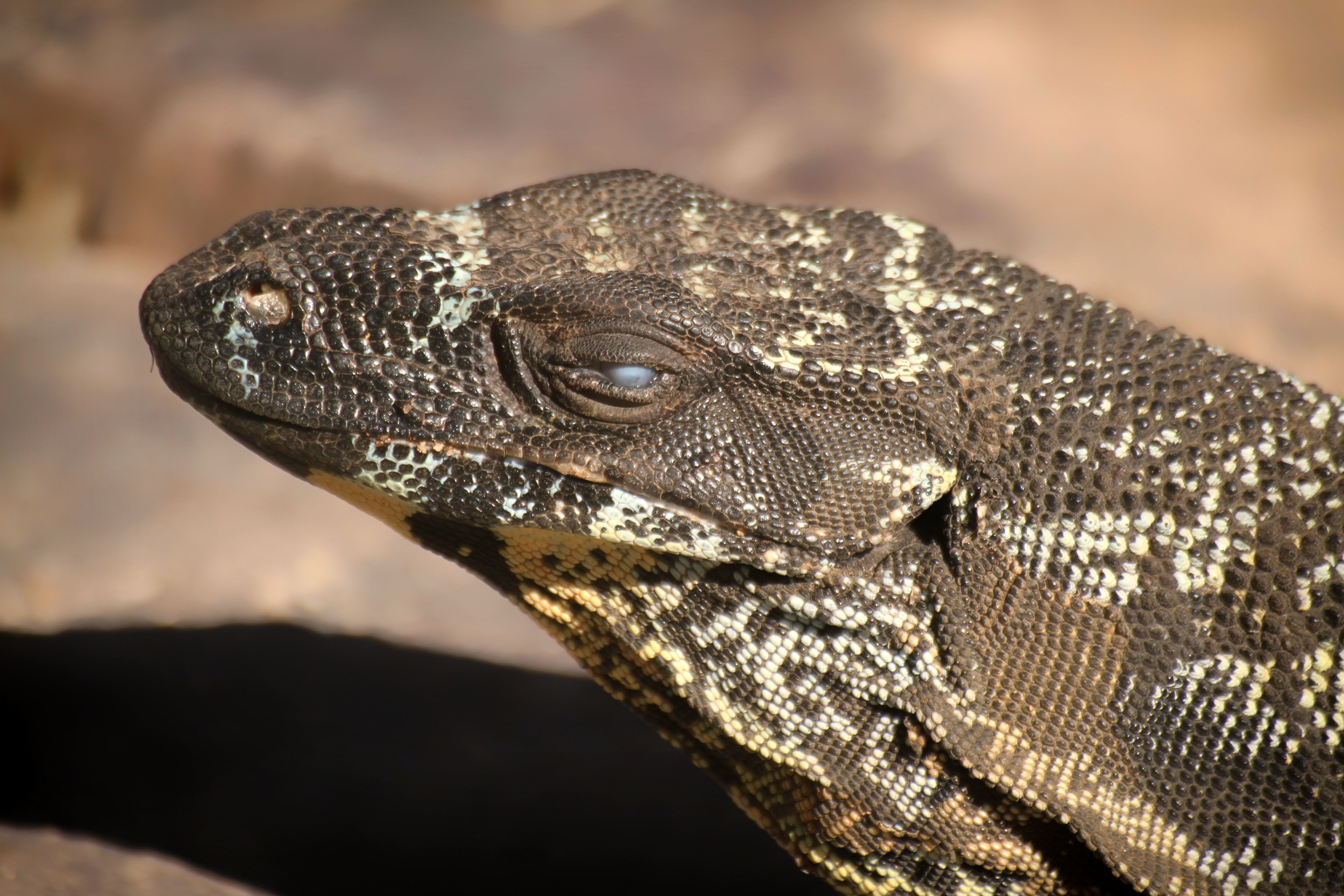
Healesville Sanctuary, Victoria, Australia

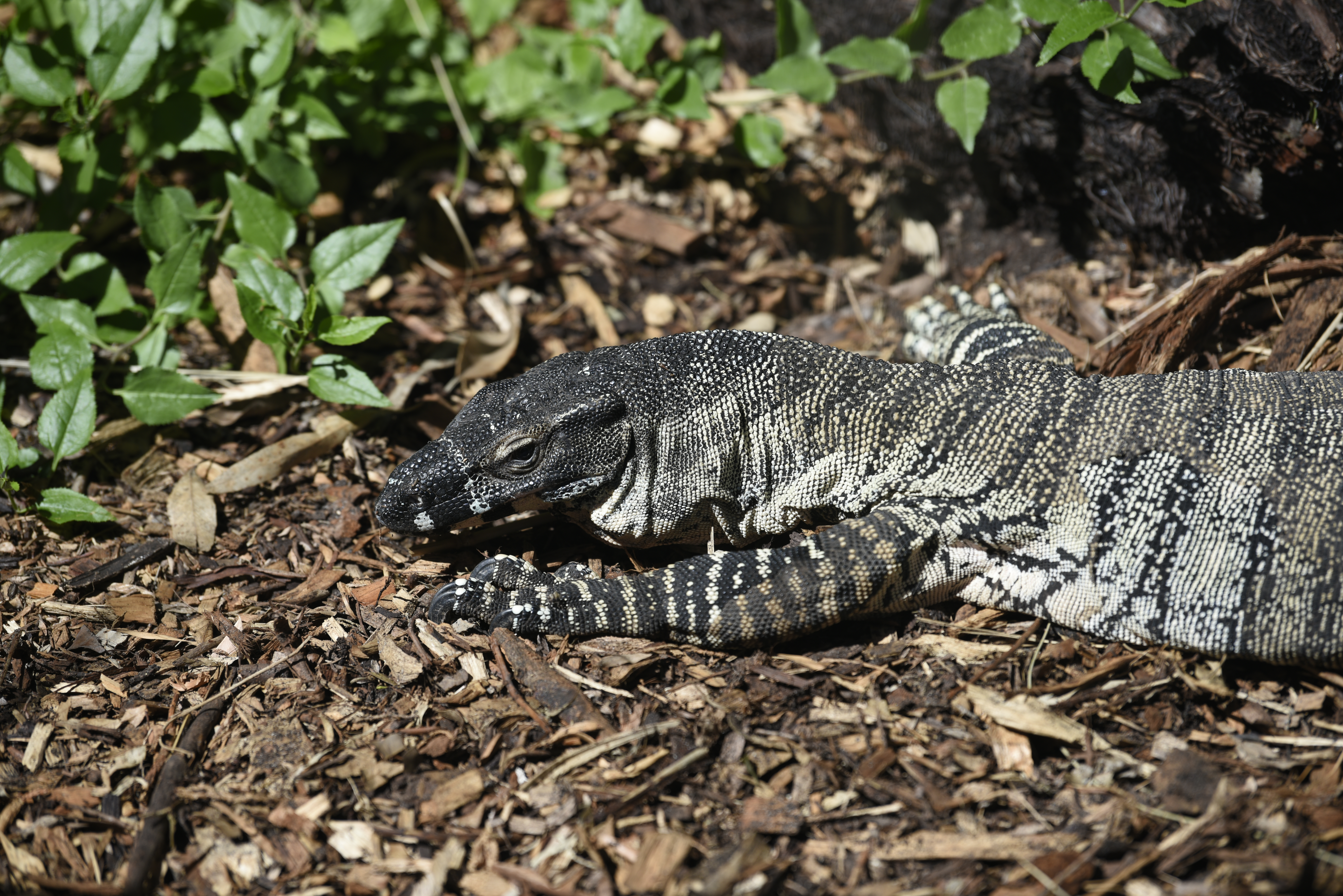
Melbourne Zoo, Victoria, Australia

Audley, Sydney

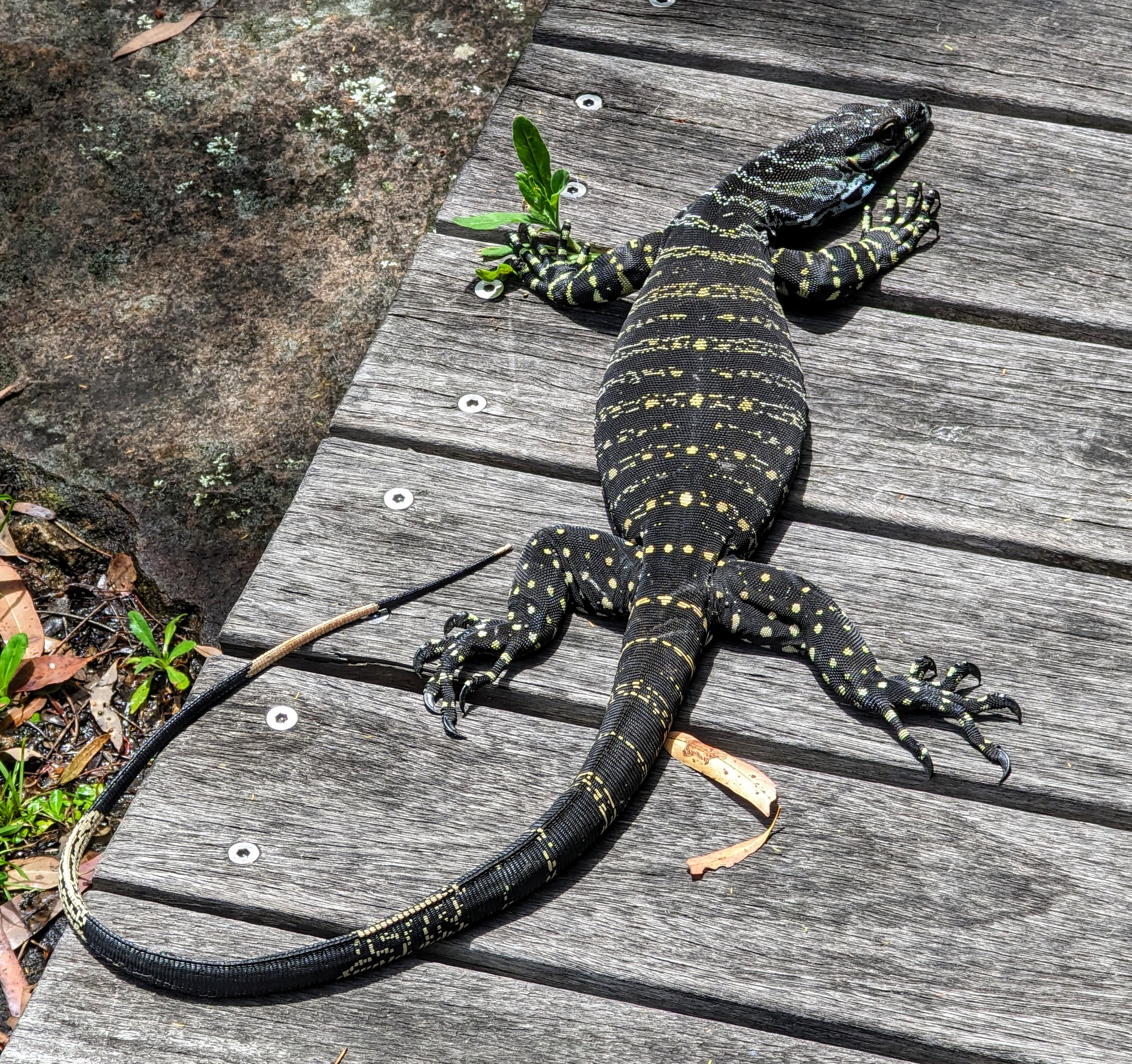
Lane Cove National Park

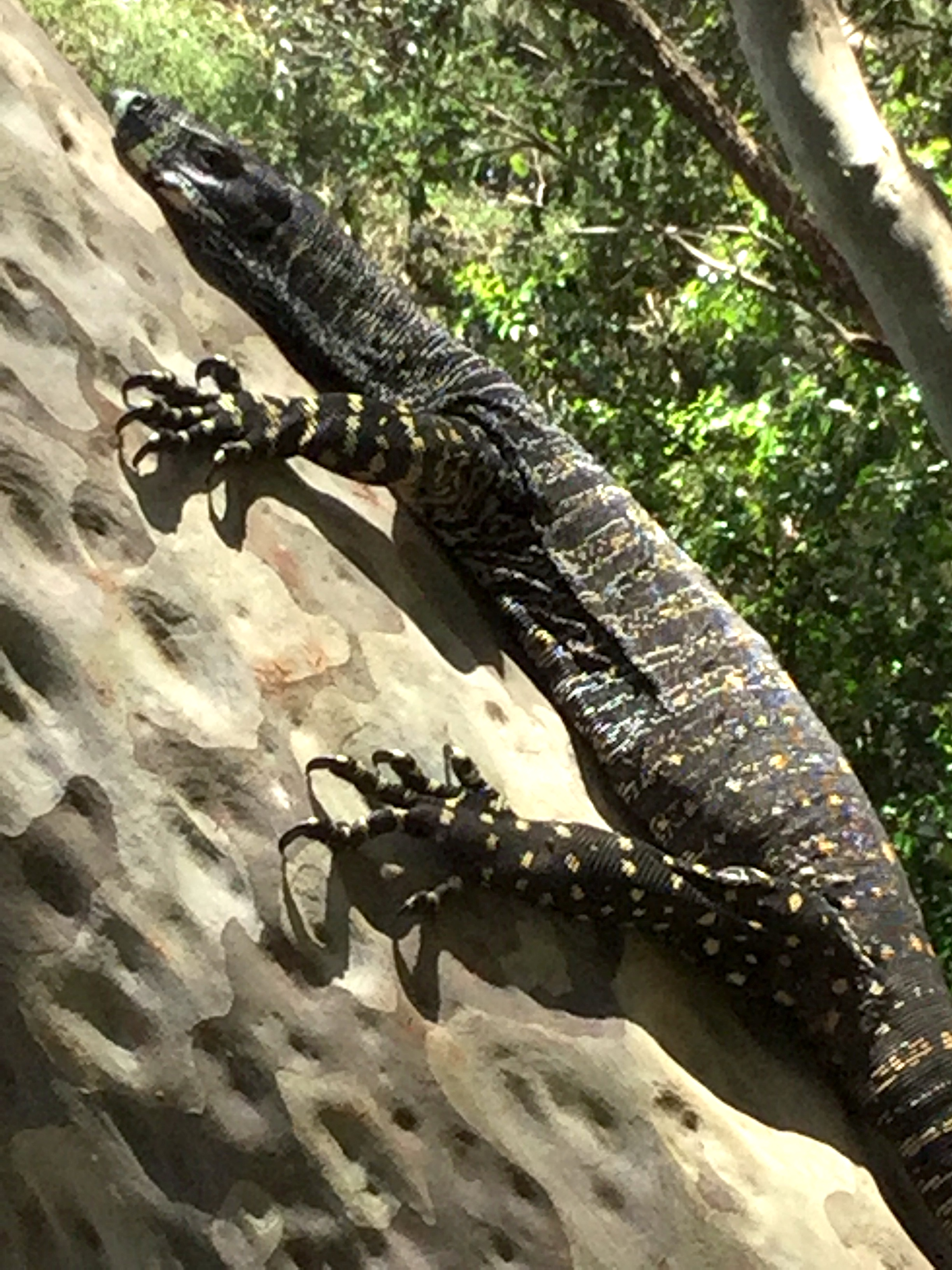
Glenrock State Conservation Area, Newcastle, New South Wales
