= Colin MacKenzie (poet) =

Australian poet and songwriter

Colin Mackenzie
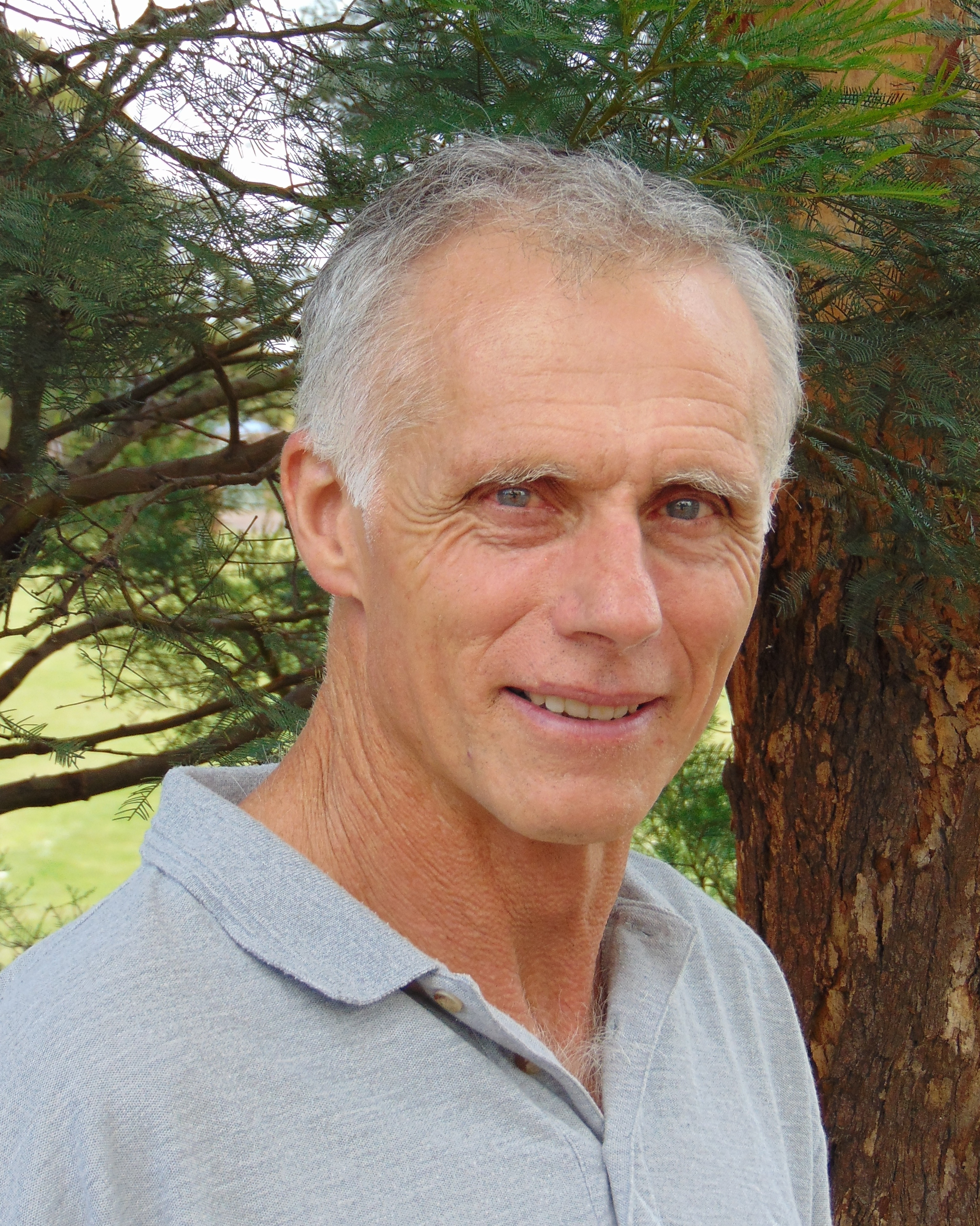
- Born: Colin Mackenzie
- Occupation(s): Poet and song writer

Colin Mackenzie is an Australian poet, songwriter and artist.

== Awards ==
In 2012 Mackenzie won, with Alita Fahey, the Canberra Country Songwriting Award for Best Honky Tonk Song (Night Horses). The song The Boy from Cooroy (written with Alita Fahey, recorded by Brothers3) was a finalist in the Australian Songwriting Competition for Best Australian Song in 2014, and a finalist in the 2015 Australian Country Music People's Choice award.

== Works ==
- Dust on the Leaves, 2013
- Lost lines: poems, songs, and photographs, 2015
- Random Thoughts: A Collection of Poems and Songs 2016 (selected poems and songs from Dust on the Leaves and Lost Lines)
- Shannon O'Leary (2016) The Blood on My Hands: An Autobiography (editor)
