= Antenna (TV series) =

Australian magazine style television show (1984–1985)

Antenna is a ABC magazine style television program for children in Australia. Aimed at 10 to 13 year olds it initially ran in a Thursday afternoon slot and was repeated on Sunday morning. The first series was presented by Gerard Sont, Rebecca Hetherington and Alita Fahey with Sandie Lillingston taking over from Fahey in the second season.
