= Gerry Sont =

Australian actor

Gerard Sont
- Born: Sydney, New South Wales, Australia
- Occupations: Actor, host
- Years active: 1977–present
- Notable work: Melvin, Son of Alvin as Melvin; Home and Away as Brett Macklin, Chan Macklin; Chances as Cal Lawrence

Gerard Sont, also known as Gerry Sont and sometimes credited as Gerald Sont, is an Australian actor and TV host.

== Early life and education ==
Gerard Sont was born Sydney, New South Wales.

He studied acting at in London, England, and later trained with Uta Hagen in New York City.

== Acting career ==
Sont joined Actors Equity of Australia in 1976.

=== Screen ===
Sont played the titular Melvin in Melvin, Son of Alvin (1984). He played recurring character Brett Mackin on Home and Away (from the series' inception in 1988, with appearances until 2005), and a main character, Cal Lawrence, in the TV series Chances.

He was the first host of Australia's version of Double Dare and was a presenter on ABC's magazine style TV series Antenna.

Sont has appeared in numerous television advertisements since 1981.

=== Stage ===
Sont has appeared on stage in productions such as How Does Your Garden Grow? at the State Theatre, Sydney in 1996, The Cherry Orchard at the New Theatre, Sydney in 1996, The Gospel of Mark at Belvoir Street Downstairs Theatre in 2000 and The Object of Desire at La Mama in 2007.

He appeared as Jean-Michel in a 1985 production of the musical La Cage aux Folles at Her Majesty's Theatre, Sydney and the Palais Theatre.

He and his wife co-founded the theatre company, Théâtre Excentrique, based in Botany, Sydney. His 2017 performance in the play with the company I'd Rather Goya Robbed Me of My Sleep garnered good reviews.

== Teaching ==
Sont taught at NIDA for nine years, where he created and facilitated their TV presenters' course, and was a senior trainer in corporate performance.

He taught occasional classes at The Actors Centre, and was head of drama at the Australian College of Entertainers in Melbourne for a year. He later transitioned into theatre productions and corporate training, and became an affiliate lecturer at UNSW Business School,

== Personal life ==
Sont met his wife Anna Jahjah, a French-Lebanese actor, in 2012 while working on a workshop for the Alliance Française. They were married in 2014.

== Filmography ==
=== Film ===
| Title | Year | Role | Type |
|---|---|---|---|
| 1982 | Running on Empty | Victor | Feature film |
| 1982 | Early Frost | Party Guest | Feature film |
| 1984 | Melvin, Son of Alvin | Melvin Purple | Feature film |
| 2006 | Superman Returns | Hospital Reporter | Feature film |
| 2006 | Gene-X | Professor White | Feature film |
| 2013 | Mover | Mr. Carter | Short film |
| 2015 | The LSD Man | Journalist | Short film |

=== Television ===
| Title | Year | Role | Type |
|---|---|---|---|
| 1976–78 | The Young Doctors | Ric Martin / Billy Webb | TV series, 26 episodes |
| 1977 | Glenview High | Andrew | TV series, 1 episode |
| 1982–83 | A Country Practice | Martin Simpson / Fredo | TV series, 4 episodes |
| 1983 | Waterloo Station | Rick Thompson | TV series |
| 1983 | The Don Lane Show | Guest | TV series, 1 episode |
| 1984 | Antenna | Presenter | TV series |
| 1985 | Butterfly Island | Bob Gallio | TV series, season 1, 7 episodes |
| 1988; 2005 | Home and Away | Brett Macklin | TV series, 46 episodes |
| 1989 | Double Dare | Host | TV series |
| 1991 | The Flying Doctors | Joe Mitchell | TV series, 1 episode |
| 1991–92 | Chances | Cal Lawrence | TV series, 36 episodes |
| 1993 | Paradise Beach | Peter | TV series, 1 episode |
| 2000 | Pizza | Ad Director | TV series, 1 episode |
| 2000 | Head Start | Journalist | TV miniseries, 2 episodes |
| 2002 | All Saints | Andre Klugston / Klugsten | TV series, 3 episodes |
| 2009 | The Cut | Radio Chat Show Host | TV miniseries, 1 episode |
| 2024 | Critical Incident | Vic Kaczmarek | TV series, 1 episode |

== Theatre ==
=== As actor ===
| Title | Year | Role | Type |
|---|---|---|---|
| 1977 | One | | Wayside Theatre, Sydney with Keyhole Productions |
| 1977 | Something for Everyman | | Sydney with Keyhole Productions |
| 1977 | Baxter | Roger Baxter | Wayside Theatre, Sydney with Keyhole Productions |
| | The Green Bay Tree | | Fort Lauderdale's Public Theatre, Florida |
| 1985 | La Cage aux Folles | Jean-Michel | Her Majesty's Theatre, Sydney, Palais Theatre, Melbourne with J. C. Williamson |
| 1988 | A Streetcar Named Desire | | Her Majesty's Theatre, Sydney & Lyric Theatre, QPAC, Brisbane |
| 1991 | Life | | St Martins Youth Arts Centre, Melbourne with Fly on the Wall Theatre & Performing Arts Projects |
| 1991 | Loving Friends | | Rippon Lea Estate, Melbourne with Performing Arts Projects |
| 1991 | Working Out | | Fairfax Studio, Melbourne with Victorian Arts Centre |
| 1991 | Heroic Measures | Klimov / Slava / Lebedev | Merlyn Theatre, Melbourne with Playbox Theatre Company |
| 1996 | The Father We Loved on a Beach by the Sea | | New Theatre, Sydney for Sydney Fringe Festival |
| 1996 | How Does Your Garden Grow? | | State Theatre, Sydney with GLS Productions |
| 1996 | The Cherry Orchard | | New Theatre, Sydney |
| | Othello | | Stables Theatre, Sydney |
| 2000 | The Gospel of Mark | | Belvoir Street Downstairs Theatre |
| 2003 | Milk | | Old Fitzroy Theatre, Sydney |
| 2003 | Three Winters Green | | Stables Theatre, Sydney |
| 2005 | About Alice | | The Crypt Theatre, Sydney with Raw-em Theatre Company |
| 2006 | Action / Shakers | | The Crypt Theatre, Sydney |
| 2007 | The Object of Desire | Grant | La Mama, Melbourne with Fly on the Wall Theatre for Midsumma Festival |
| 2010 | Taking a Bullet | Agent Kubrick | Still Knocks Productions for Short+Sweet |
| 2013 | Richard III (Or Almost) | Guy Laurence | King Street Theatre, Sydney |
| 2014 | Poo Poo Pee Doo | July-et Caputlet | Short+Sweet & Sandy Point Theatre with Théâtre Excentrique |
| 2014 | Leaves | Chas | King Street Theatre, Sydney with Théâtre Excentrique & Emu Productions |
| 2015 | Antigone | First Guard | PACT, Sydney with Théâtre Excentrique |
| 2016 | 7 Days in the Life of Simon Labrosse | Labrosse | Creative Space 99, Sydney with Théâtre Excentrique |
| 2017 | I'd Rather Goya Robbed Me of My Sleep Than Some Other Son of a Bitch | Father / Narrator | Old 505 Theatre, Sydney with Théâtre Excentrique |
| 2017; 2018; 2019 | Murders at the Museum | | Australian Museum, Sydney, Australian National Maritime Museum, Sydney, Royal Botanic Garden, Sydney with Théâtre Excentrique |
| 2019 | Exit the King | The Doctor | Théâtre Excentrique |
| 2022 | Tideline | | Old 505 Theatre, Sydney with Théâtre Excentrique |

=== As director / producer ===
| Title | Year | Role | Type |
|---|---|---|---|
| 2004 | Mamet x 2: All Men Are Whores | Director | Cat and Fiddle Hotel, Sydney with Roughhouse Theatre |
| 2005 | Dwarf Spotting | Director | Seymour Centre, Sydney with Out Of Bounds Productions for Short+Sweet |
| 2005 | True West | Director | Cat and Fiddle Hotel, Sydney with Insomniac Theatre Company |
| 2013 | Robert Zucco | Producer | Old Fitzroy Theatre, Sydney with Le Theatre des Assassins & Independent Theatre Company |
| 2016; 2017 | Beirut Adrenaline | Production Manager | Belvoir Street Theatre, Sydney |
