= Colin McKenzie =

Colin McKenzie may refer to:

- Death of Sergeant Colin McKenzie
- Colin McKenzie (cricketer) (1880–1930), Australian cricketer
- Colin Campbell McKenzie (1836–1899), member of the Legislative Assembly of British Columbia
- Colin McKenzie (rugby union) (born 1964), Canadian rugby union player
- Colin McKenzie, character in mockumentary Forgotten Silver

== See also ==
- Colin Mackenzie (disambiguation)
