= Ray McCoy (radio personality) =

Australian broadcaster

- Presenting career
- Show: Real Country with the Real McCoy
- Station: Howdy FM
- Time slot: 9:00am–12:00pm weekdays
- Previous shows: 2LF, 2NM, 2TM/2MO, 2KA, KIX Country and 88.9FM

Ray McCoy is an Australian broadcaster and country music radio personality from Tamworth, New South Wales. He was a former sports news presenter on Prime7 Newcastle and is currently the morning presenter on Howdy FM.

== Early life ==
Ray McCoy was born to Doreen and Killer McCoy and is a triplet. He was raised in Muswellbrook before moving to Penrith and then to Gunnedah but resides in Tamworth, New South Wales.

== Career ==
Ray McCoy has worked at 2LF Cowra, 2NM Muswellbrook, 2TM Tamworth, 2MO Gunnedah, 2KA Penrith, Festival FM Tamworth, 2HH Newcastle, KIX Country, 88.9 FM Tamworth and current station Howdy FM.

Ray McCoy also wrote “We'll Never Part” a single by Australian boy band Brothers3.

McCoy is also the President of Group 4 Rugby League in Tamworth.

== Related links ==
- Howdy FM website
