= Smooth knob-tailed gecko =

The smooth knob-tailed gecko is a type of gecko and may refer to:

- Nephrurus laevissimus
- Nephrurus levis
