= Colin Mackenzie (anatomist) =

Australian anatomist, benefactor, museum administrator (1877–1938)

Sir William Colin Mackenzie PRSA FRSE (9 March 1877 – 29 June 1938) was an Australian anatomist, benefactor, museum administrator and director. He was best known for creating Healesville Sanctuary.

== Study of fauna ==
Mackenzie returned to Melbourne in 1918, taking a house at 612 St Kilda Road converting a part of it into a museum and laboratory; from 1919 this was called the Australian Institute of Anatomical Research.

Mackenzie's collection of preserved specimens of Australian native fauna became very large and valuable, and he refused an American offer of a large sum for it and donated it to the nation. The National Museum of Australian Zoology was established in 1924 by an Act of Parliament and located in Melbourne. It housed Sir Colin Mackenzie’s collection of preserved specimens.

Mackenzie was made the first director with the title of Professor of Comparative Anatomy. In 1924, Mackenzie's book Intellectual Development and the Erect Posture was published and it reproduced his drawings (e.g. echidna and platypus) and his photographs of their brains. The book's dust jacket announced further publications from the National Museum, one on development of human intestines and peritoneum; the other on myology of Australian reptiles, monotremes and marsupials.

In 1931 the Museum was moved to Canberra, renamed, by statute, as the Australian Institute of Anatomy.

Mackenzie was granted permissive occupancy of approximately 32 hectares (79 acres) of bushland at Badger Creek, Healesville, by the State authorities as a field station for his research in 1920. Before vacating the land in 1927, he had fenced it off, built a house for a curator, a workshop, animal pens and a cottage for visiting scientists. He then recommended that the reserve be increased to approximately 200 hectares (490 acres) and be made a national park. In May 1934, the Sir Colin MacKenzie Sanctuary was officially opened.
