= Brothers3 =

Australian musical group

- Origin: Mudgee, New South Wales, Australia
- Genres: Country; folk; bluegrass
- Instruments: Banjo; bass; clarinet; guitar; harmonica; keyboard; mandolin; trumpet
- Years active: 2009–present
- Labels: Hardrush Music; Sony; Warner
- Members: Makirum Fahey-Leigh; Shardyn Fahey-Leigh; Tayzin Fahey-Leigh
- Website: www.brothers3.com

Brothers3 are an Australian country music band from Mudgee, New South Wales. The band consists of brothers Makirum, Shardyn and Tayzin Fahey-Leigh. In 2014, Brothers3 were the last contestant eliminated on the sixth season of The X Factor Australia.

== Early life ==
Brothers3 is made up of siblings Makirum, Shardyn and Tayzin Fahey-Leigh. Their mother Alita Fahey is also a singer, as well as a former actress and television reporter. The band's father Stephen died from a heart attack on 25 December 2006. Brothers3 also have two other siblings. They grew up on a farm in Mudgee, New South Wales surrounded by music because their farm had no regular electricity, television or running water. The brothers were home schooled through distance education.

== Career ==
=== 2009–14: Formation and music releases ===
Brothers3 were formed as a present for their mother's 50th birthday. Their debut single "Road to Cargalgong" was released as a double A-side with the song "Where the Eagles Fly" on 30 November 2009. Brothers3's debut studio album, also titled Where the Eagles Fly, was released on 31 March 2010 by independent record label Hardrush Music. The album features 10 original songs that the band co-wrote on their farm in the New South Wales Central Western Slopes. Their second single "Christmas in Australia" was released as a double A-side with "A Christmas Song" in December 2010. "Lyrebird on the Roof" was independently released on 1 January 2011 as the lead single from Brothers3's second studio album Wattle Fire. The album was independently released on 29 January 2011.

The band's fourth single "Kelsey's Song" was independently released on 4 February 2011. It was later included on Brothers3's third studio album Australia, which was independently released on 1 December 2011. Their fourth studio album, Let It Drift, was independently released on 31 January 2013. Travelling and Favourites were released as Brothers3's fifth and sixth studio albums on 17 January 2014. The former features original songs, while the latter album includes a mix of original songs and covers. Brothers3's cover version of Leonard Cohen's "Hallelujah" was released as a single from Favourites on 1 September 2014.

=== 2014: The X Factor Australia ===
In 2014, Brothers3 successfully auditioned for the sixth season of The X Factor Australia, singing "Safe & Sound" by Taylor Swift. They received four yeses from the judges and progressed to the super bootcamp round of the competition. For the first bootcamp challenge, Brothers3 were paired up with another group from the Groups category to perform a song together for the judges. Brothers3 made it to the second bootcamp challenge, where they performed "Story of My Life" by One Direction to the judges and a live audience of one thousand. Brothers3 then progressed to the home visits round in Sydney and performed "Eternal Flame by The Bangles in front of their mentor Dannii Minogue and guest mentors Jessica Mauboy and James Blunt. They were originally eliminated by Minogue during home visits, but were later put forward as her wildcard and won the public vote, ensuring a place in the live finals—a series of eleven weekly live shows in which contestants are progressively eliminated by public vote. After the eliminations of Trill, Younger Than Yesterday and XOX during the first four weeks of the live shows, Brothers3 became the last remaining act in Minogue's category despite being just her wildcard. During the grand final decider show on 20 October 2014, it was announced that Brothers3 were the last contestant eliminated behind runner-up Dean Ray and winner Marlisa Punzalan.

==== Performances on The X Factor ====
denotes a performance that entered the ARIA Singles Chart.
denotes eliminated.

Show	Theme	Song	Original artist	Order	Result
Audition	Free choice	"Safe & Sound"	Taylor Swift	N/A	Through to super bootcamp
Super bootcamp 1	Group performance	"Back for Good"	Take That	N/A	Through to super bootcamp 2
Super bootcamp 2	Solo performance	"Story of My Life"	One Direction	N/A	Through to home visits
Home visits	Free choice	"Eternal Flame"	The Bangles	N/A	Eliminated (Brought back as wildcard)
Week 1	Judges' Choice	"Just the Way You Are"	Bruno Mars	9	Safe
Week 2	Legends	"Always on My Mind"	Elvis Presley	12	Safe
Week 3	Decades Challenge	"Happy Birthday Helen"	Things of Stone and Wood	1	Safe
Week 4	Top 10 Hits	"Hey Brother"	Avicii	5	Safe
Week 5	Latest and Greatest	"Pompeii"	Bastille	2	Safe (1st)
Week 6	Rock	"Every Teardrop Is a Waterfall"	Coldplay	8	Safe
Week 7	Judges' Challenge	"I'm Gonna Be (500 Miles)"	The Proclaimers	1	Safe
Week 8	Aussie Week	"Amnesia"	5 Seconds of Summer	5	Safe
Week 9	Killer Tracks and Curveballs	"The Sound of Silence"	Simon & Garfunkel	4	Safe
Week 9	Killer Tracks and Curveballs	"Que Sera"	Justice Crew	7	Safe
Week 10 (Semi-Final)	Power and Passion	"Best Song Ever"	One Direction	1	Safe
Week 10 (Semi-Final)	Power and Passion	"Massachusetts"	Bee Gees	5	Safe
Week 11 (Grand Final)	Audition song	"Safe & Sound"	Taylor Swift	4	Eliminated
Week 11 (Grand Final)	Duet	"Like a Drum" (with Guy Sebastian)	Guy Sebastian	2	Eliminated
Week 11 (Grand Final)	Winner's single	"The Lucky Ones"	Brothers3	7	Eliminated

=== 2014–present: Brothers Never Part ===
On 24 October 2014, it was announced that Brothers3 had received a recording contract with Sony Music Australia. Their sixth overall single "The Lucky Ones", which would have been their winner's single if they had won The X Factor, was released on the iTunes Store that same day. It debuted at number 29 on the ARIA Singles Chart. Following the single's release, Brothers3 were dropped by Sony Music and signed with Warner Music Australia in 2015. The group's seventh single "Brothers Never Part" was released on 11 September 2015. Their seventh studio album of the same name will be released on 15 January 2016, and marks their first major label album release.

== Artistry ==
Brothers3 perform traditional country, folk and bluegrass music. Aside from singing, they write their own songs "about real stories, animals and the countryside". The band can also play the banjo, bass, clarinet, guitar, harmonica, keyboard, mandolin, and trumpet. Brothers3 cite Darren Cogan, John Williamson, Johnny Cash, Keith Urban, Miley Cyrus, Reg Poole, The Robertson Brothers, Slim Newton and Taylor Swift as their musical inspirations.

== Members ==
=== Shardyn Fahey-Leigh ===
Shardyn Fahey-Leigh, born 18 December 1995 (age 30), is the eldest brother in the band. He cites Earl Scruggs, John Denver and Keith Urban as his musical influences. Aside from music, Shardyn has also pursued a career in acting and musical theatre. In 2002, he made a guest appearance in the season four episode "A Prefect Murder" of the Australian/American sci-fi television series Farscape. In 2006, Shardyn appeared alongside Hugh Jackman in the arena tour of The Boy from Oz, playing the role of a young Peter Allen. In 2008, Shardyn played the role of Wil in John Williamson's bush musical Quambatook. That same year, he made a guest appearance in the Australian soap opera Home and Away as Jamie Cooper, the son of Julie Cooper. The following year, he appeared in the season one episode "Bertie 1918" of the Australian children's television series My Place, playing the role of young magician Bertie. Shardyn left school early to attend university. Prior to entering The X Factor, he studied at the Australian Academy of Music and Performing Arts.

=== Tayzin Fahey-Leigh ===
Tayzin Fahey-Leigh, born 23 December 1996 (age 29), is the second-eldest brother. He cites country music and Queen as his influences. Aside from music, Tayzin has also pursued a career in acting. In 2002, he made a guest appearance in the season five episode "Bedtime Stories" of the Australian medical drama television series All Saints, playing the role of Brian Richards. In 2005, Tayzin appeared in the films Son of the Mask and Hell Has Harbour Views. In June 2011, he played the teenage Chad Morgan in the documentary film I'm Not Dead Yet. Tayzin left school early to attend university. Prior to entering The X Factor, he studied at JMC Academy in Sydney.

=== Makirum Fahey-Leigh ===
Makirum Fahey-Leigh, born 28 December 1997 (age 28), is the youngest brother. He cites Guthrie Govan as his musical influence. Aside from music, Makirum has also pursued a career in acting and musical theatre. In 2008, he played the role of Pete in John Williamson's bush musical Quambatook. Makirum also appeared in the films Happy Feet (2006) and The Black Balloon (2008). In September 2011, he made a guest appearance in the twelfth episode of the Australian television drama series Crownies, playing the role of Brett O'Leary. Makirum left school early to attend university. Prior to entering The X Factor, he studied at the Australian Academy of Music and Performing Arts.

== Discography ==
=== Studio albums ===
List of studio albums
Title	Album details	Peak chart positions
Title	Album details	AUS
Where the Eagles Fly	Released: 31 March 2010 (Australia); Label: Hardrush Music; Formats: CD, digital download	—
Wattle Fire	Released: 29 January 2011 (Australia); Formats: CD, digital download	—
Australia	Released: 1 December 2011 (Australia); Formats: CD, digital download	—
Let It Drift	Released: 31 January 2013 (Australia); Formats: CD, digital download	—
Travelling	Released: 17 January 2014 (Australia); Formats: CD, digital download	—
Favourites	Released: 17 January 2014 (Australia); Format: CD	—
Brothers Never Part	Released: 15 January 2016 (Australia); Format: CD, digital download	11
"—" denotes an album that did not chart.

=== Singles ===
List of singles
Title	Year	Peak chart positions	Album
Title	Year	AUS	Album
"Road to Cargalgong" / "Where the Eagles Fly"	2009	—	Where the Eagles Fly
"Christmas in Australia" / "A Christmas Song"	2010	—	—N/a
"Lyrebird on the Roof"	2011	—	Wattle Fire
"Kelsey's Song"	2011	—	Australia
"Hallelujah"	2014	—	Favourites
"The Lucky Ones"	2014	29	—N/a
"Brothers Never Part"	2015	—	Brothers Never Part
"We’ll Never Part" (Written by Ray McCoy)	2019	—	—N/a
"—" denotes a single that did not chart.

=== Other charted songs ===
List of non-single songs
Title	Year	Peak chart positions
Title	Year	AUS
"Just the Way You Are"	2014	98
"Always on My Mind"	2014	73
"Happy Birthday Helen"	2014	86
"Hey Brother"	2014	58
"Pompeii"	2014	91
"I'm Gonna Be (500 Miles)"	2014	75
"Que Sera"	2014	42
"The Sound of Silence"	2014	48
"Massachusetts"	2014	87
"Safe & Sound"	2014	82

=== Music videos ===
List of music videos
Title	Year	Director(s)	Ref.
"Road to Carcalgong"	2010	Ross Wood	
"Where the Eagles Fly"	2010	Ross Wood	
"Leaving Home Now"	2011		
"Wattle Fire"	2011	Ross Wood	
"Home Is Where the Heart Is"	2012		
"Australia"	2012	Justin J. Wood	
"Convict Lady"	2013		
"Tiny's Mandolin"	2013	Alita Fahey	
"Let It Drift"	2013		
"They Call the Country"	2014		
"The Lucky Ones"	2014		

== Awards and nominations ==
Year	Type	Award	Result (wins only)
2009	Canberra Country Music Awards	Best New Artist	Won
2010	Canberra Country Songwriting Awards	Country Composition Youth (Shardyn Fahey-Leigh)	Won
2010	Canberra Country Songwriting Awards	Best Balladeer Song ("Leaving Home Now")	Won
2010	Canberra Country Songwriting Awards	Best Country Blues Song ("Slow Joe Blues")	Won
2010	Canberra Country Songwriting Awards	Best Rockabilly Song ("Where the Eagles Fly")	Won
2011	Australian Country Music People's Choice Awards	Best Group	Won
2011	Australian Country Music People's Choice Awards	Most Promising Future Star	Won
2011	Australian Independent Music Video Awards	Best Country Music Video ("Where the Eagles Fly")	Won
2011	Canberra Country Music Awards	Best Children's Country Song ("Tony's Farm")	Won
2011	Canberra Country Songwriting Awards	Best Children's Country Song ("Tony's Farm")	Won
2011	Canberra Country Songwriting Awards	Best Rockabilly Song ("That Happy Feeling")	Won
2011	Tamworth Meet 'n' Greet Fans Choice Awards	Most Popular Independent Group/Duo	Won
2012	Tamworth Songwriters Awards	Children's Song of the Year ("Tony's Farm" (with Alita Fahey)	Won
2012	Australian Country Music People's Choice Awards	Best Group or Duo	Won
2012	Canberra Country Music Awards	Best Australian Heritage Song ("Australia")	Won
2012	Canberra Country Music Awards	Best Alternate Country Song ("Country Vs. Rock")	Won
2012	Canberra Country Music Awards	Best Country Swing Song ("Crowpecker Blues")	Won
2012	Canberra Country Music Awards	Best Folk/Australiana Song ("Convict Lady")	Won
2013	Australian Country Music People's Choice Awards	Best Group	Won
2013	Australian Independent Music Video Awards	Best Country Music Video ("Tiny's Mandolin")	Won
2014	Australian Country Music People's Choice Awards	Best Group or Duo	Won
2014	Australian Country Music People's Choice Awards	Best Album (Let It Drift)	Won
2015	Australian Country Music People's Choice Awards	Best Group or Duo	Won
2016	Australian Country Music People's Choice Awards	Best Group or Duo	Won
2016	Australian Country Music People's Choice Awards	Best Song (Brothers Never Part)	Won
2016	Australian Country Music People's Choice Awards	Best Video Clip (Brothers Never Part)	Won

=== Country Music Awards of Australia ===
The Country Music Awards of Australia is an annual awards night held in January during the Tamworth Country Music Festival. Celebrating recording excellence in the Australian country music industry. They commenced in 1973.

Year	Nominee / work	Award	Result	Ref.
2016	Brothers 3	New Talent of the Year	Nominated	
