= Iguana (disambiguation) =

Iguana is a genus of herbivorous lizards.

Iguana may also refer to:

== Biology ==
- in America, any member of Iguanidae, the iguana family
  - especially the Green iguana or common iguana, the species popular as pets
- in Africa, a large member of Varanus
  - especially Varanus niloticus, the Nile monitor
- in Madagascar, members of Opluridae, the Madagascan iguana family.
- some members of family Corytophanidae, Hoplocercidae, Leiosauridae, Liolaemidae and Tropiduridae.
- Iguana meat

== Music ==
- The Iguanas (Michigan band), one of Iggy Pop's bands
- The Iguanas (Louisiana band), a rock band from New Orleans, Louisiana
- Iguana (album) a 2019 album by Polish Club (band)
- "Iguana", a single by Mauro Picotto, 1999
- "Iguana", a single by Inna, 2018

== Computing ==
- IGUANA Computing, the computing usage group
- IguanaTex, a free open source LaTeX formula editor add-in for Powerpoint
- Iguana Entertainment, a defunct US video game developer.

== Other uses ==
- RG-34 (Iguana FV4), a South African armoured car
- Iguana Girl (or Daughter of the Iguana or Iguana Daughter), a manga by Moto Hagio
- Iguana (film), a 1988 film directed by Monte Hellman
- San Antonio Iguanas, a minor league professional ice hockey team based in San Antonio, Texas
- Mr. Iguana, Mexican professional wrestler

== See also ==
- Iguanodon
- Guana (disambiguation)
- Guano
- Goanna
- The Night of the Iguana, a short story and play by Tennessee Williams, which has been filmed
