= Goanna =

Several species of reptiles

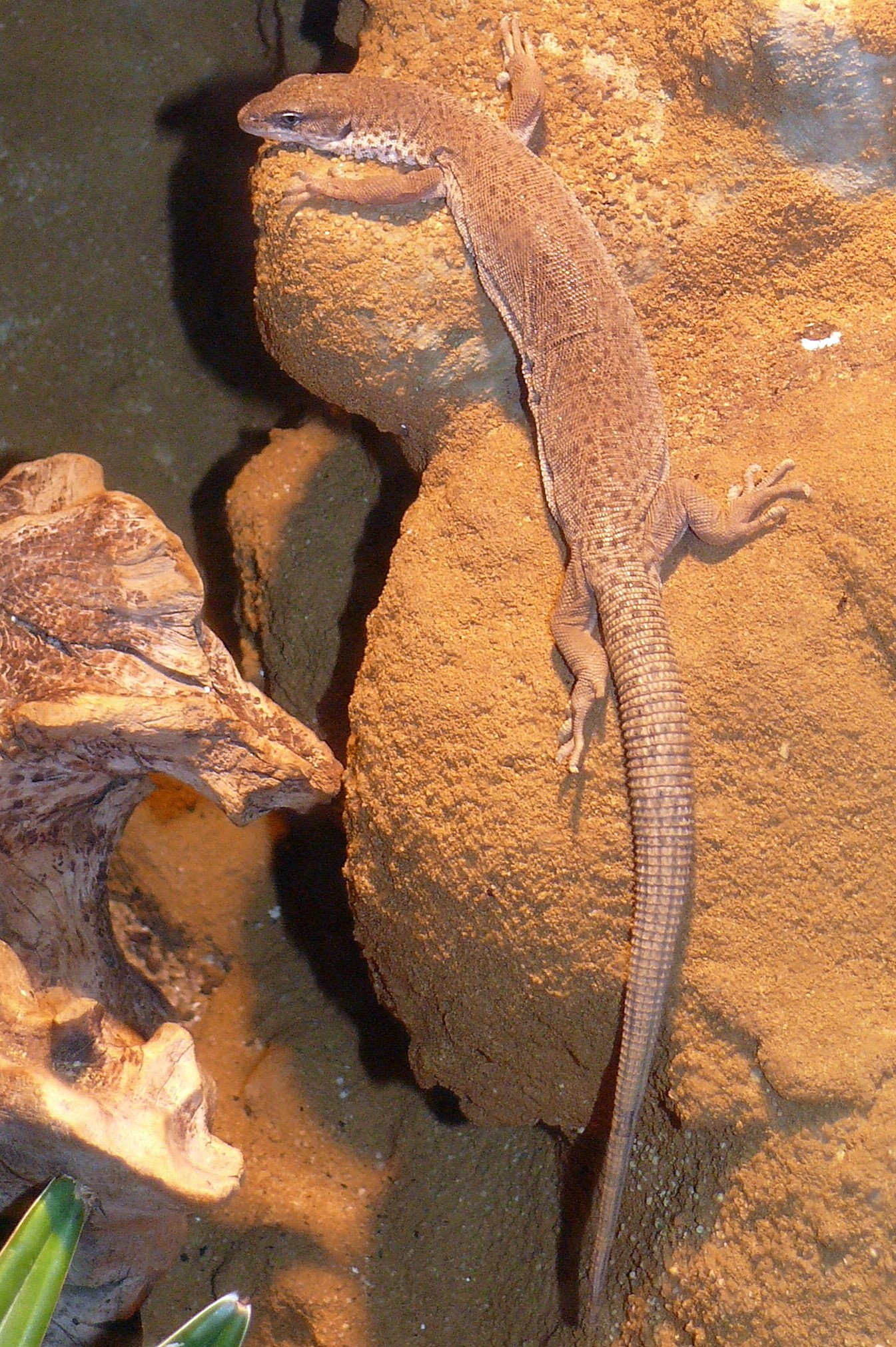
Stripe-tailed goanna (Varanus caudolineatus)

A goanna is any one of several species of lizard of the genus Varanus found in Australia and Southeast Asia.

Around 70 species of Varanus are known, 25 of which are found in Australia. This varied group of carnivorous reptiles ranges greatly in size and fills several ecological niches.

The goanna features prominently in Aboriginal mythology and Australian folklore.

Being predatory lizards, goannas are often quite large with sharp teeth and claws. The largest is the perentie (V. giganteus), which can grow over 1.5 m (4.9 ft) in length. Not all goannas are so large; pygmy goannas may be smaller than the arm of an adult human. The smallest of these, the short-tailed monitor (V. brevicauda), reaches only 20 cm (8 in) in length. They survive on smaller prey, such as insects and mice.

Goannas combine predatory and scavenging behaviours. They prey on any animal they can catch that is small enough to eat whole. They have been blamed by farmers for the death of sheep, though most likely erroneously, as goannas are also eaters of carrion and are attracted to rotting meat.

Most goannas are dark-coloured, with greys, browns, blacks, and greens featuring prominently; however, white is also common. Many desert-dwelling species also feature yellow-red tones. Camouflage ranges from bands and stripes to splotches, speckles, and circles, and can change as the creature matures, with juveniles sometimes being brighter than adults.

Like most lizards, goannas lay eggs. Most lay eggs in a nest or burrow, but some species lay their eggs inside termite mounds. This offers protection and incubation; additionally, the termites may provide a meal for the young as they hatch. Unlike some other species of lizards, goannas do not have the ability to regrow limbs or tails.

== Etymology ==
The name goanna is derived from iguana. Early European bush settlers in Australia likened goannas to the South American lizards. Over time, the initial vowel sound was dropped. A similar explanation is used to link possums to the American opossum.

The South African term for a monitor lizard is leguaan and this word is also from Spanish 'la iguana'.

== Species ==
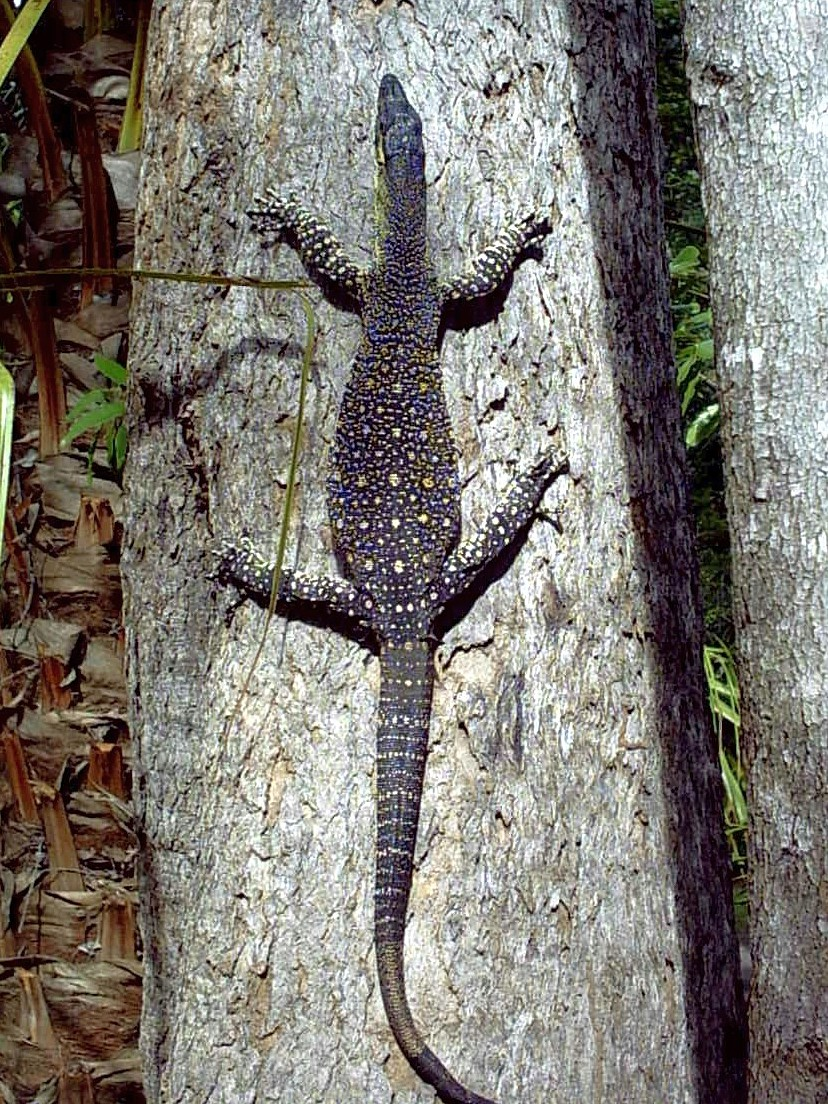
A lace monitor (V. varius) in Byfield National Park

For a list of all monitor lizards of the genus, see Complete list of genus Varanus. The following are found in Australia. For the most part, in common names, "goanna" and "monitor" are interchangeable.

- Perentie – V. giganteus
- Lace monitor – V. varius
- Sand goanna – V. gouldii (also Gould's goanna or ground goanna)
- Mertens' water monitor – V. mertensi
- Spiny-tailed monitor – V. acanthurus (also ridge-tailed monitor)
- Mangrove monitor – V. semiremex
- Black-headed monitor – V. tristis
- Short-tailed monitor – V. brevicauda
- Argus monitor – V. panoptes (also yellow-spotted monitor)
- Rosenberg's monitor – V. rosenbergi
- Spencer's goanna – V. spenceri
- Storr's monitor – V. storri
- Dampier Peninsula monitor – V. sparnus
- Mitchell's water monitor – V. mitchelli
- Kings' monitor – V. kingorum
- Southern Pilbara rock goanna – V. hamersleyensis
- Black-palmed rock monitor – V. glebopalma
- Kimberley rock monitor – V. glauerti
- Pygmy mulga monitor – V. gilleni
- Rusty desert monitor – V. eremius
- Stripe-tailed goanna – V. caudolineatus
- Pilbara monitor – V. bushi
- Black-spotted ridge-tailed monitor – V. baritji
- Emerald tree monitor – V. prasinus
- Canopy goanna – V. keithhornei

== Habitats ==
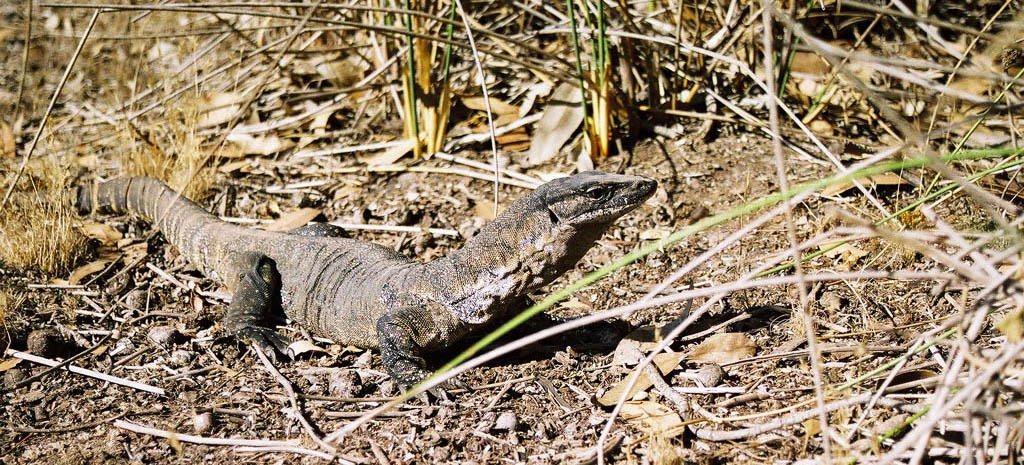
Heath goanna (Varanus rosenbergii), Kangaroo Island, South Australia

Goannas are found throughout most of Australia, except for Tasmania, and manage to persist in a variety of environments. Most species are known to climb trees or outcrops; several primarily arboreal species are known. The lace monitor (V. varius) is probably the best-known among these, but is not the most common. The lace monitor is the second-largest of all goannas, reaching lengths up to 2 m (6.6 ft). Other more common tree goannas, such as the Timor tree monitor (V. timorensis) and mournful tree monitor (V. tristis,) do not grow to quite such lengths, typically a maximum of 61 cm, nose-to-tail.

Other goannas are adapted to swampy coastal environments, such as the mangrove goanna (V. semiremex). Further still, Mertens' water monitor (water goanna – V. mertensi), found in lagoons and rivers across northern Australia, is streamlined for swimming, using its tail as a paddle. Most other goannas are good swimmers, but tend not to voluntarily venture into water.

== Diet ==
The diets of goannas vary greatly depending on the species and the habitat. Prey can include all manner of small animals: insects, smaller lizards, snakes, mammals, birds, and eggs.

Meals are often eaten whole, thus the size of their meals may depend on the size of the animals. Many of the small species feed mostly on insects, with some being small lizard experts. Many of the medium to large species feed on whatever prey they can catch. This includes eggs, fish (V. mertensi), birds, snails, smaller lizards, snakes, marsupials, and other small mammals, such as rodents. The giant perentie has been observed killing a young kangaroo, and then biting out chunks of flesh like a dog.

All species are carrion eaters, so feed on the carcasses of dead animals, including livestock and other large creatures. The smell of rotting meat also attracts these lizards.

== Goannas and humans ==
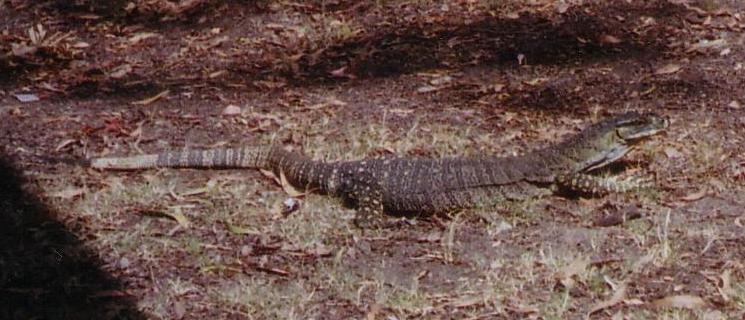
A goanna at Grey Gum picnic area at Mount Coot-tha, Queensland, Australia

=== Confrontations ===
Like most native fauna, goannas are rather wary of human intrusions into their habitat, and most likely run away (into the scrub, up a tree, or into the water, depending on the species). A goanna is a rather swift mover, and when pressed, sprints short distances on its hind legs.

Goannas also rear up when threatened, either chased or cornered, and also inflate flaps of skin around their throats and emit harsh hissing noises.

Some goannas lose their initial fear of humans, especially when food is involved (or has been previously involved). The wildlife authority recommends not feeding animals while in their territory. An attack can cause serious injury in exceptional cases, but most authorities doubt that a goanna will direct an intentional attack at a human unless the human has attempted to attack it (or grasp at it) first. Indigenous Australians who hunt goannas for food consider the perentie to be a high-risk (but tasty) quarry.

Debate is growing as to whether goannas are venomous. The incessant bleeding caused by goanna bites had been thought to be the result of bacterial infection, but a 2005 study suggested monitor lizards (including goannas) are venomous and have oral toxin-producing glands.

The goanna's hefty tail can be dangerous when swung, much like a crocodile's tail; small children and dogs have been knocked down by such attacks. Often victims in goanna attacks are bystanders, watching the person antagonising the goanna. Alarmed goannas can mistake standing humans for trees and attempt to climb them to safety, which is painful and can be distressing for both human and goanna.

=== Conservation status ===
Goannas are protected species throughout Australia.

=== Culture and folklore ===
Goannas have a prominent place in many Indigenous Australian cultures. This includes totemic relationships, anthropomorphic representations in dreamtime stories, and as a food source. Representations of goannas are common in Indigenous artwork, not just as food, but also as a symbolic spiritual motif. Smaller goannas and the mighty perentie are often considered two different animals when appearing in Aboriginal works, as in the story "How the Goanna and Perentie Got Their Colours".

European settlers perpetuated several old wives' tales about goanna habits and abilities; some of these have persisted in modern folklore among campers and bushmen. This includes the above-mentioned exaggeration of goannas dragging off sheep from shepherds' flocks in the night. This might even be exaggerated into child-snatching, rivalling drop bears (attack koalas) as a tourist scarer, but probably more convincing due to the reptiles' carnivorous nature and fearsome appearance.

A common tale was that the bite of a goanna was infused with a powerful, incurable venom. Every year after the bite (or every seven years), the wound would flare up again. For many years, herpetologists generally believed goannas were nonvenomous, and lingering illness from their bites was due solely to infection and septicaemia as a result of their saliva being rife with bacteria from carrion and other food sources. However, in 2005, researchers at the University of Melbourne announced that oral venom glands had been found in both goannas and iguanas.

Because the goanna regularly eats snakes (which may involve a fierce struggle), including venomous species, they are often said to be immune to snake venom. However, no evidence found suggests an actual venom immunity. Other stories say that the lizard eats a legendary plant, or drinks from a healing spring, which neutralises the venom. (This idea is immortalised in Banjo Paterson's humorous poem "Johnson's Antidote".)

Goanna fat or oil has been anecdotally imbued with mystical healing properties (possibly in connection with their supposed venom immunity). Aboriginal people traditionally used goanna oil as an important bush medicine, and it also became a common medicine among Caucasians shortly after British settlement in Australia. Said to be a cure-all, and possessing amazing powers of penetration (passing through metal as if it were not there), it was sold among early settlers like snake oil in the Old West of North America.

A goanna features as the heroic figure Mr Lizard in the Australian author May Gibbs’ children's books Snugglepot and Cuddlepie. A bronze statue of the goanna Mr Lizard has been placed outside the State Library of Victoria.

The villain in the Disney film The Rescuers Down Under, Percival C. McLeach, has a pet goanna named Joanna.
