= Now We're Cookin' =

Now We're Cookin' may refer to:

- Now We're Cookin', a fictitious cooking show in the music video for "Weird Al" Yankovic's song "Foil"
- Now We're Cookin' (album), a 2021 album by garage rock duo Polish Club
- "Now We're Cookin'", a song from the 2022 film Everything Everywhere All at Once
