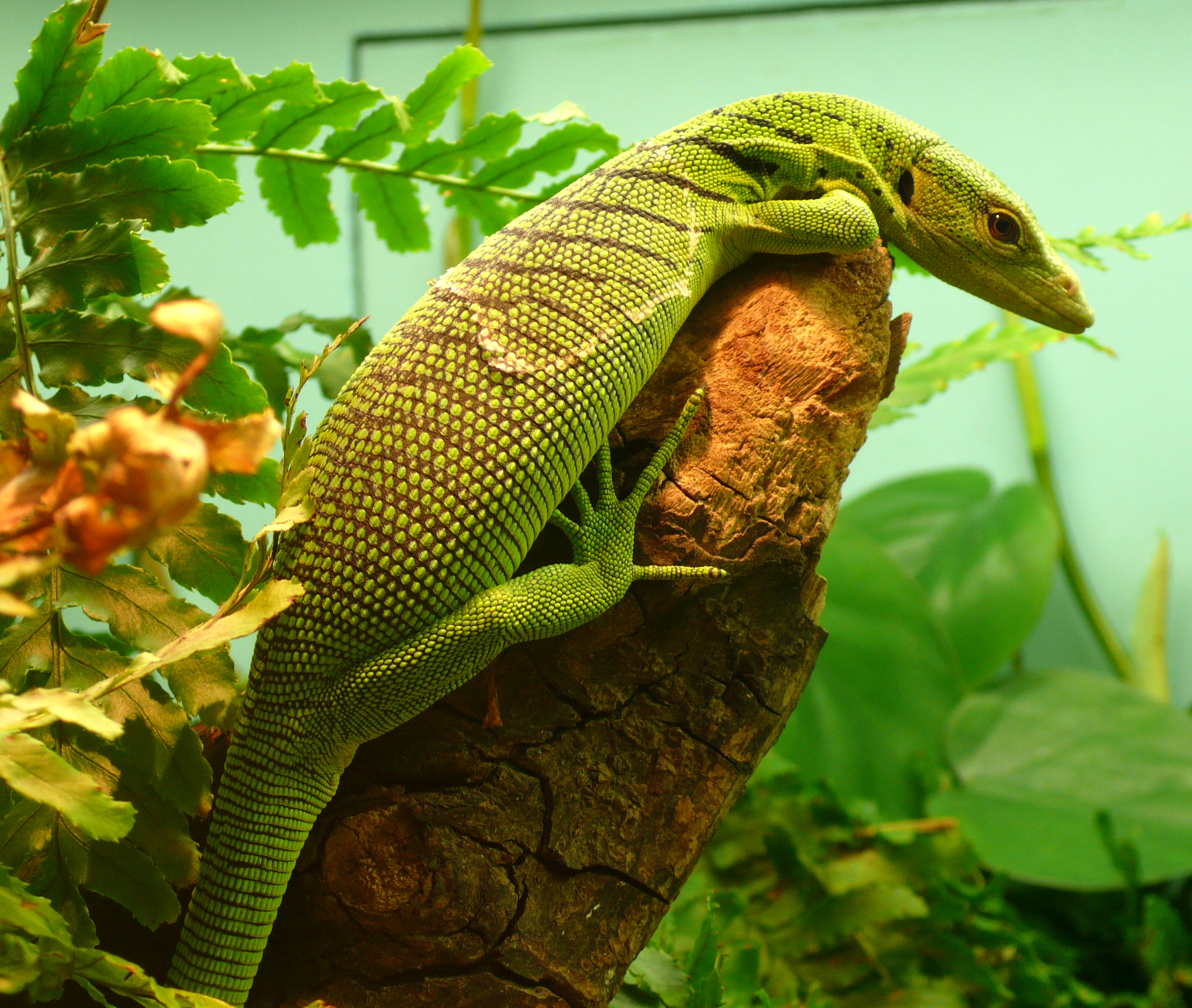

Conservation status
- Least Concern (IUCN 3.1)
- CITES Appendix II

Scientific classification
- Kingdom: Animalia
- Phylum: Chordata
- Class: Reptilia
- Order: Squamata
- Suborder: Anguimorpha
- Family: Varanidae
- Genus: Varanus
- Subgenus: Hapturosaurus
- Species: V. prasinus

Binomial name
- Varanus prasinus Schlegel, 1839
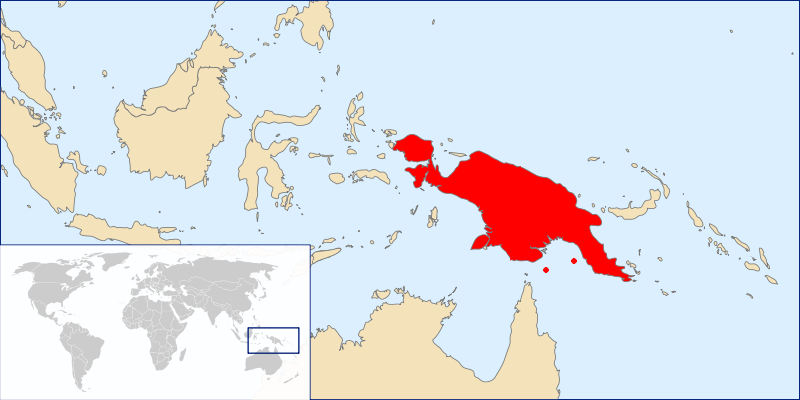
- Distribution of the emerald tree monitor, shown in red

= Emerald tree monitor =

Species of lizard

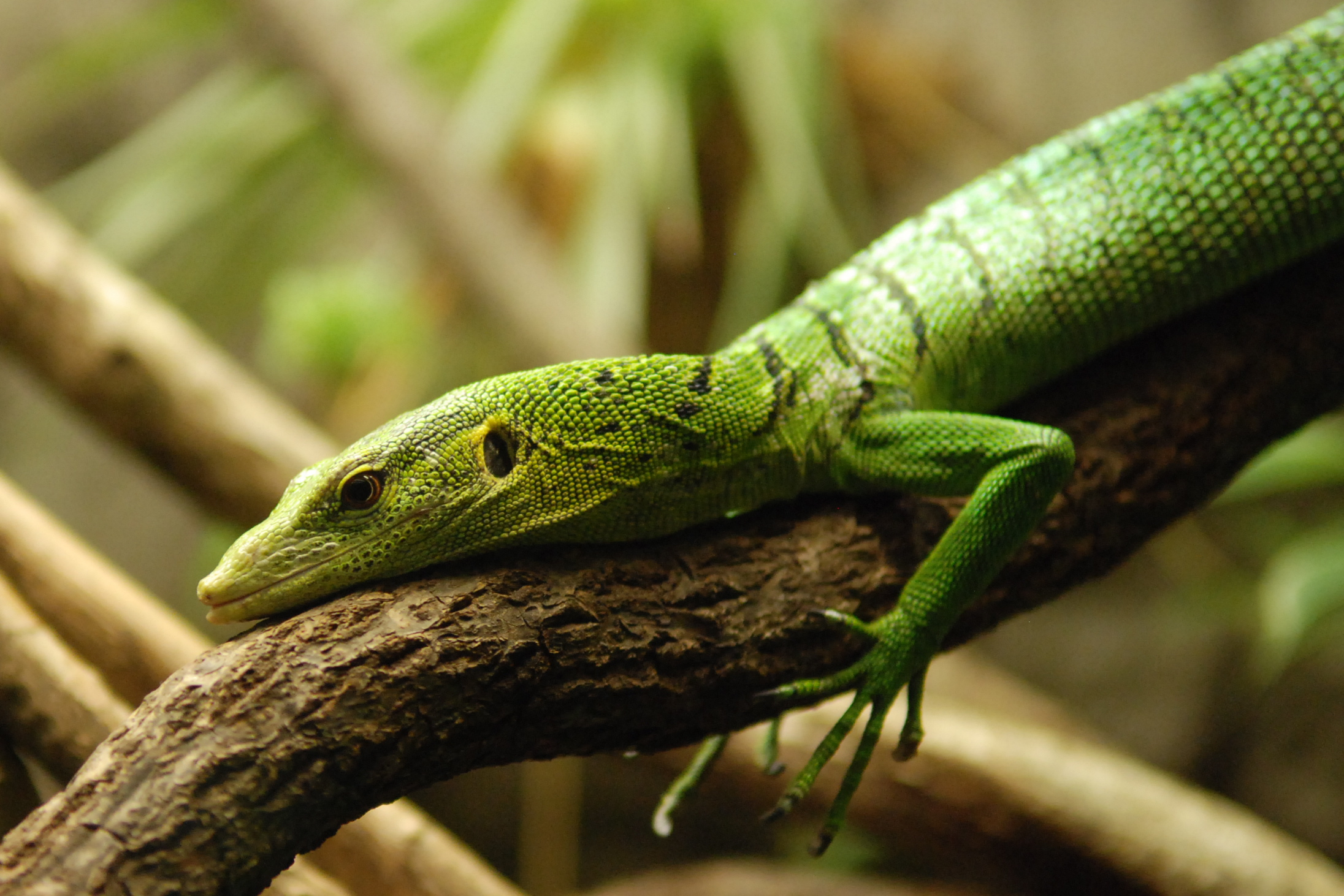
Emerald tree monitor

The emerald tree monitor (Varanus prasinus) or green tree monitor is a small to medium-sized arboreal monitor lizard. It is known for its unusual coloration, which consists of shades from green to turquoise, topped with dark, transverse dorsal banding. This coloration helps camouflage it in its arboreal habitat. Its color also makes the emerald tree monitor highly prized in both the pet trade and zoos alike.

== Names ==
It is known as wbl km in the Kalam language of Papua New Guinea.

== Taxonomy ==
Varanus prasinus was first described as Monitor viridis by John Edward Gray in 1831; however, Gray's original holotype (RMNH 4812 in the National Natural History Museum in Leiden) was lost and the species was redescribed by Schlegel eight years later as V. prasinus using the found specimen. The generic name Varanus is derived from the Arabic word waral (ورل), which translates to English as "monitor". Its specific name, prasinus, is Latin for the color green.

Varanus prasinus is a member of the subgenus Hapturosaurus and is closely related to several other arboreal species. However, this species may be paraphyletic, as V. bogerti was found to clade inside it. This indicates that V. prasinus may actually be composed of multiple species, although the paraphyly may instead be a result of introgression or incomplete lineage sorting.

In addition to V. prasinus, this subgenus, whose members are all allopatric, includes V. beccarii (Aru Islands), V. boehmei (Waigeo Island), V. bogerti (D'Entrecasteaux Archipelago), V. keithhornei (Cape York Peninsula), V. kordensis (Biak Island), V. macraei (Batanta Island), V. reisingeri (Misool Island) and V. telenesetes (Rossel Island).

== Evolutionary history ==
The family Varanidae probably originated in Asia about 65 million years ago, although some estimates are as early as the late Mesozoic (112 million years ago). Monitor lizards probably migrated to Australia and the Indonesian archipelago between 39 and 26 million years ago. All members of the V. prasinus species group (sometimes referred to as subgenus Euprepiosaurus) are found east of Lydekker’s line in the Indo-Australian Archipelago. This group probably originated in the Moluccas, although dating their origins is complicated by the paucity of the fossil record. The absence of large placental predatory mammals east of Wallace's line may be partially responsible for the radiation of the V. prasinus group in the Australo-Papuan region.

== Distribution ==
Emerald tree monitors and their close relatives can be found on the island of New Guinea (split between Indonesia and Papua New Guinea) as well as several adjacent islands, and the northern Torres Strait Islands. The green tree monitor is reported to thrive in lowland environments, including tropical evergreen forests, palm swamps and cocoa plantations.

== Description ==
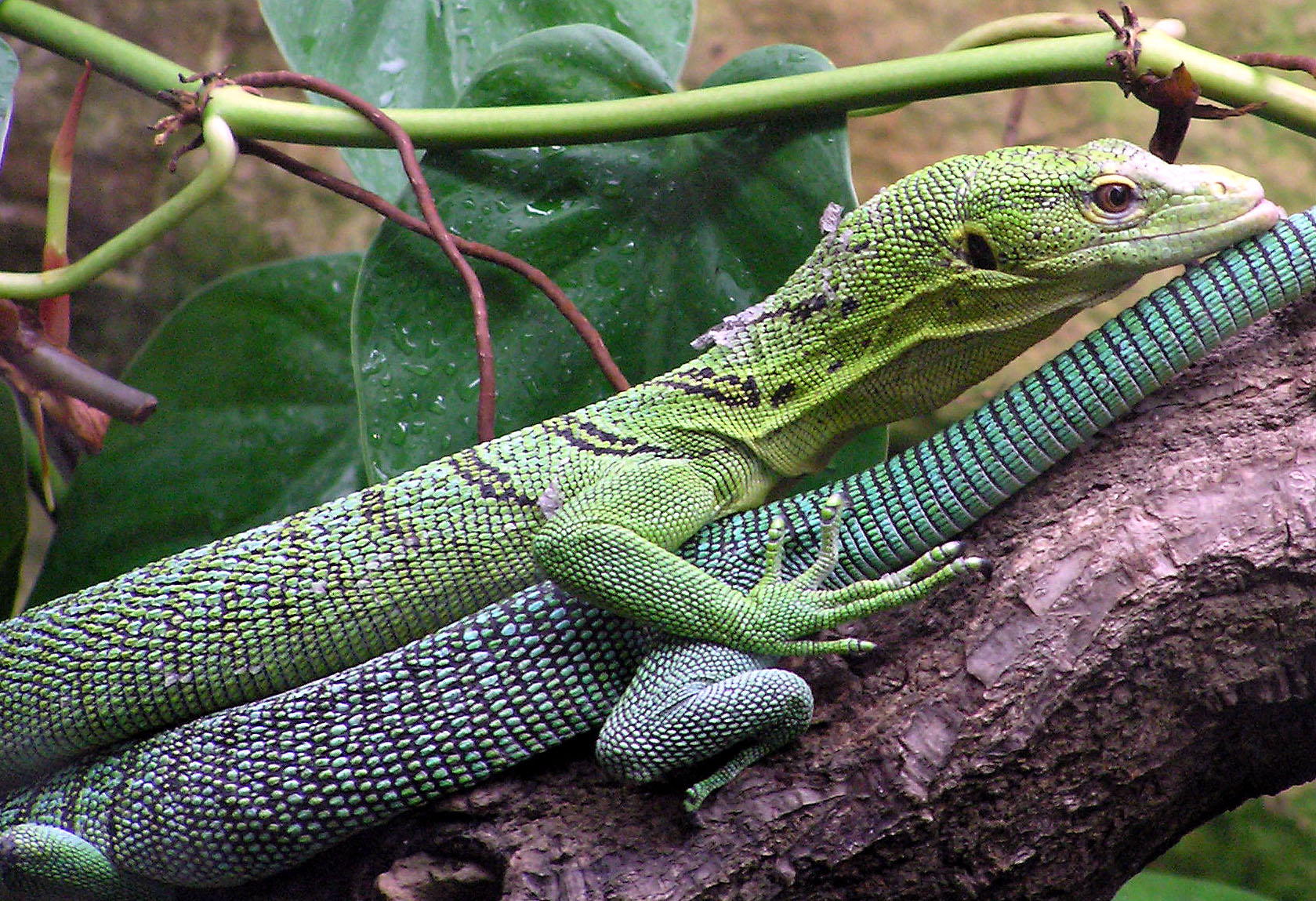
Emerald tree monitors at the Bristol Zoo

The emerald tree monitor is about 75–100 cm (30–39 in) long with a slender body that helps it support itself on narrow branches. It uses its prehensile tail and long claws to grip branches. Unlike other varanids, this monitor defends its tail rather than lashing with it for defence when threatened. The soles of the feet of the emerald tree monitor have enlarged scales which aid the lizard when climbing.

== Ecology ==
When threatened, the emerald tree monitor will flee through vegetation or bite if cornered.

It is one of the few social monitors, living in small groups made up of a dominant male, several females, and a few other males and juveniles.

== Diet ==
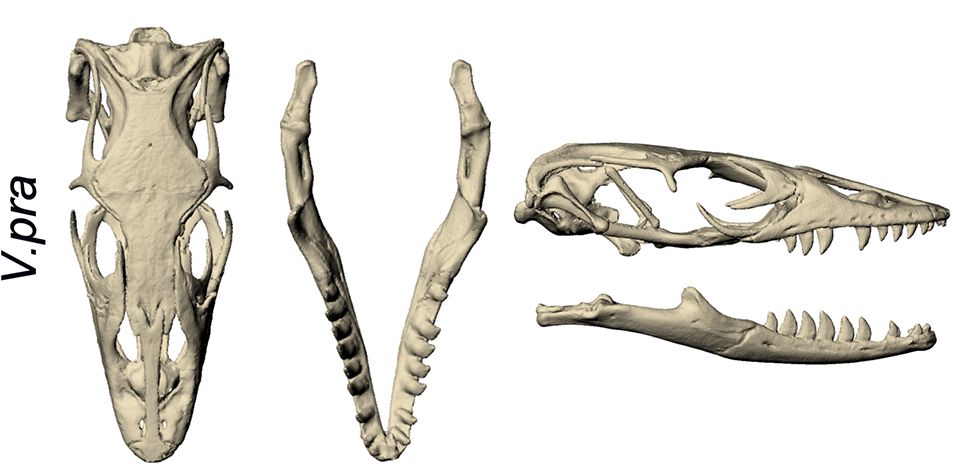
Emerald tree monitor skull

The emerald tree monitor's diet consists of large tree-dwelling arthropods, such as katydids, grasshoppers, other orthopterans, stick insects, cockroaches, beetles, centipedes, spiders and crabs, as well as birds and small mammals (such as Moncton's mosaic-tailed rat). Before swallowing stick insects, the lizards tear off the legs. Captive specimens tear off the limbs of rodents prior to eating them; as a result, they are capable of swallowing mammals of a considerable size: A 135-g lizard was documented as eating a 40-g rodent, almost one-third its size.

On two occasions, this species has also been documented eating fruit in captivity by herpetologists—Robert Mertens observed them feeding on bananas, and Robert G. Sprackland fed bananas and cantaloupes to his captive specimens. The latter did so after noticing that 12% of the feces in wild caught specimens consisted of plant material.

Despite a lack of aquatic adaptations, the Bronx Zoo has recorded a captive emerald tree monitor swimming and foraging for food under shallow water.

== Reproduction ==
Clutches consist of up to five eggs, each weighing 10.5–11.5 g (0.37–0.41 oz) and measuring about 2 by 4.5 cm (0.79 by 1.77 in). As many as three clutches are laid throughout the year; clutches have been laid by captives in January, March, April, November, and December. The female emerald tree monitor lays her eggs in arboreal termite nests. The eggs hatch between 160 and 190 days later, typically from June to November, after which the young eat the termites and the termite's eggs within minutes of hatching. Sexual maturity is reached in about one year.
