= Bogert's monitor =

Conservation status
- Least Concern (IUCN 3.1)

Scientific classification
- Kingdom: Animalia
- Phylum: Chordata
- Class: Reptilia
- Order: Squamata
- Suborder: Anguimorpha
- Family: Varanidae
- Genus: Varanus
- Subgenus: Hapturosaurus
- Species: V. bogerti

Binomial name
- Varanus bogerti Mertens, 1950

Synonyms
- Varanus prasinus bogerti Mertens, 1950; Varanus bogerti — Sprackland, 1991; Varanus (Euprepiosaurus) bogerti — Ziegler et al., 2007; Varanus (Hapturosaurus) bogerti — Bucklitsch et al., 2016

Species of lizard

Bogert's monitor (Varanus bogerti) is a species of tree-dwelling monitor lizard. The species is native to Papua New Guinea.

== Taxonomy ==
This species was found to clade inside V. prasinus (emerald tree monitor), making V. prasinus a paraphyletic species. This indicates that V. prasinus may actually be composed of multiple species, although the paraphyly may instead be a result of introgression or incomplete lineage sorting.

Etymology

Both the specific name, bogerti, and the common name, Bogert's monitor, are in honor of American herpetologist Charles Mitchill Bogert.

== Geographic range ==
V. bogerti is found on the D'Entrecasteaux Islands and the Trobriand Islands of Papua New Guinea.

== Habitat ==
The preferred natural habitat of V. bogerti is forest at altitudes from sea level to 400 m (1,300 ft).

== Reproduction ==
V. bogerti is an oviparous species.
