= Iguana (album) =

Studio album by Polish Club
- Released: 7 June 2019
- Studios: Rolodex Studios, Sydney, Australia; The Grove Studios, Somersby, Australia
- Length: 45:12
- Labels: Double Double; Island; UMA
- Producer: Wade Keighran

Polish Club chronology
Okie Dokie (2017)	Iguana (2019)	Nye_2020_megamix.exe (2019)

Singles from Iguana
- 1. "Clarity" Released: October 2018; 2. "We Don't Care" Released: March 2019

Iguana is the second studio album by Australian garage duo, Polish Club. It was released on 7 June 2019 and peaked at number 20 on the Australian ARIA Albums Chart.

The album title refers to a bar on Kellett Street the duo used to frequent in Sydney's Kings Cross. The album was supported by the Meet Me At The Iguana Australian tour which commenced in June 2019.

In an interview with Music Feeds' Riley Fitzgerland, Dave Novak referenced the album title and bar saying "It was the place you ended up when you had a massive night and you wanted to forget all your worries and do stupid stuff". Novak said "I think the whole album sort of fits into this night time scenario, a night out where you kind of have your own mental anxiety and social pressures and all that goes along with that. And hopefully, that makes sense across the whole twelve songs because that’s where it came from for us."

== Reception ==
Professional ratings
Review scores
Source	Rating
The Music	3.5/5 stars
The AU Review	4/5 stars

Al Newstead from Triple J said "Iguana couldn't be accused of being the same album as Alright Already. It successfully treads a fine balance between the need to expand their sonic horizons without sailing too far from what appealed about them in the first place."

Donald Finlayson from The Music called the album "a bloody good time for the most part." Finlayson said "Reminiscent of The Colour and the Shape-era Foo Fighters and Death from Above 1979, Iguana will be an easy sell for anyone who likes a good fuzz-tone or a blown-out larynx."

Dylan Marshall from The AU Review called it "a blistering debut album" saying "Coming in at twelve tracks and forty-five minutes long, Iguana is a massive step forward for Polish Club. Having always been able to release catchy garage rock, the way the band has progressed on the notoriously difficult second album is a sure fire sign of the genius in the band. It foreshadows bigger things to come.."

Harry Webber from Life Without Andy said the album is "Full of classic PC riffery, huge vocal hooks, and danceable rhythms, and sees the duo masterfully walk that line between polished indie-pop and head banging rock."

== Track listing ==
All songs written and performed by Polish Club, unless noted.

1. "We Don't Care" – 4:19
2. "Iguana" – 4:02
3. "Goddamn! " – 3:29
4. "Clarity" – 4:04
5. "Breakapart" – 3:22
6. "Sun" – 4:07
7. "Time Crisis" – 4:00
8. "As Low As It Goes" – 3:53
9. "Let's Pretend" – 2:55
10. "2 Scared" (co-written by PJ Harding) – 2:27
11. "Moonlighting" – 4:14
12. "I Don't Need This Anymore" – 4:13

== Charts ==
Chart performance for Iguana
Chart (2019)	Peak position
Australian Albums (ARIA)	20

== Release history ==
Release history and formats for Iguana
Region	Date	Format	Label	Catalogue	Version	Reference
Australia / Various	7 June 2019	CD; LP; digital	Double Double; Island; UMA	7755169 - 7755170	Original album	
Australia	7 June 2019	CS (limited to 100 copies)	Double Double; Island; UMA	—N/a	Iguana Early Demos	
