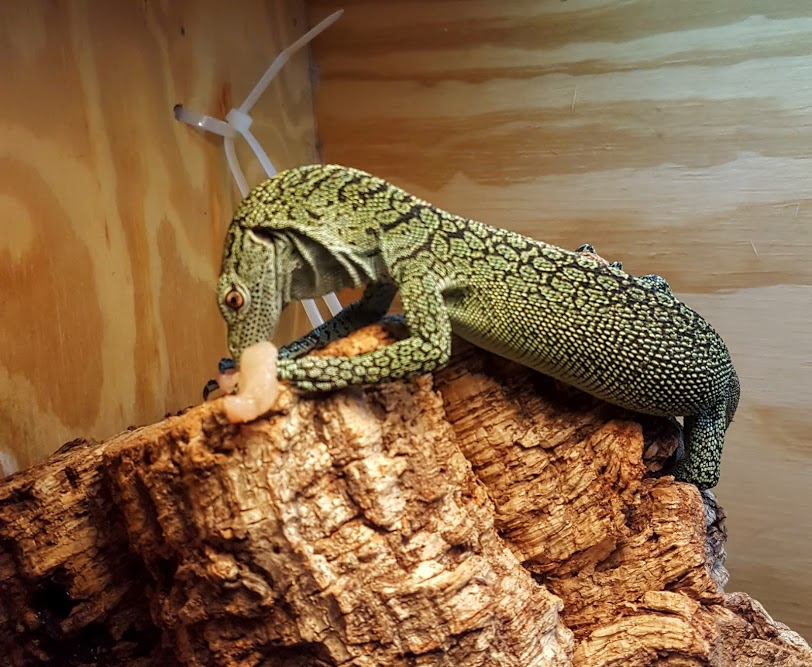
- Photo of a young captive Kordo feeding showing the unique lace pattern

Conservation status
- Data Deficient (IUCN 3.1)

Scientific classification
- Kingdom: Animalia
- Phylum: Chordata
- Class: Reptilia
- Order: Squamata
- Suborder: Anguimorpha
- Family: Varanidae
- Genus: Varanus
- Subgenus: Hapturosaurus
- Species: V. kordensis

Binomial name
- Varanus kordensis (A.B. Meyer, 1874)

= Varanus kordensis =

Species of lizard

Varanus kordensis, the Biak tree monitor, is a member of the Varanidae family found on Biak Island in Indonesia. It is also known as the Kordo tree monitor. Long considered a subspecies of the emerald tree monitor (V. prasinus), most authorities now treat it as a separate species.

== Description ==
The Biak tree monitor is mainly yellow-green, although in captivity specimens frequently lose their yellow pigment and become turquoise in color. It has a black netted pattern which is visible on its back. It reaches a total length of up to 90 cm.

== Captivity ==
Kordo tree monitors are kept and occasionally bred in captivity by reptile hobbyists. Care is similar to that for other members of the Euprepiosaurus subgenus which includes the emerald tree monitor, Varanus prasinus. Large, spacious, vertically oriented enclosures with many hiding spots, thick branches and cork bark tubes allow these shy, arboreal monitors to climb, hide and forage for food. Wild-caught animals are often shy, nervous and can take many months to acclimate to captivity. Like most wild-caught tree monitors they usually harbor multiple intestinal parasites such as nematodes, tapeworms, protozoa and amoeba. Due to the stress of captivity, parasite loads often increase significantly and can cause serious problems such as anorexia, lethargy and failure to thrive or reproduce. Fecal exams followed by the appropriate anti-parasitic therapy should always be done. As inhabitants of tropical rainforests, Kordo Tree Monitors should be kept at an RH of 75% or higher to prevent dehydration and shedding problems. They have been known to take many different food items in captivity, with staple diets usually consisting of crickets, roaches such as Dubia or Orange Head, grasshoppers and egg. As occasional food items, they have been known to take chicken, meat, shrimp and rodents. Vitamin and Calcium supplements should be included to help ensure that all nutritional requirements are being met. There is also video evidence of at least one specimen eating watermelon in captivity.

Reproduction in captivity has been known to occur, with clutches of 2-5 eggs being observed 25–40 days after copulation. Incubation of eggs with a moist substrate at 86 F has resulted in hatching after 160–175 days. Females have been known to lay multiple times per year and should be well-fed and parasite-free to ensure health of the female and viability of the eggs.
