= Now We're Cookin' in Hell =

Studio album by Polish Club
- Released: 10 June 2022
- Recorded: November 2021
- Studio: At Golden Retriever Studios, Sydney, Australia
- Label: Double Double; Island
- Producer: Wade Keighran

Polish Club chronology
Now We're Cookin' (2021)	Now We're Cookin' in Hell (2022)

Singles from Now We're Cookin' in Hell
- 1. "Unstable" Released: 4 March 2022; 2. "Boys on Vacation" / "Bad Vibrations" Released: 29 April 2022

Now We're Cookin' in Hell is the fourth studio album by the Australian garage duo, Polish Club. It was released on 10 June 2022. The album did not enter the ARIA Top 100 Albums Chart but peaked at number 20 on the ARIA Australian Artist Albums Chart.

The duo promoted the album was free concerts in Melbourne and Sydney in June 2022.

Now We're Cookin' in Hell was written during Polish Club's sessions of Now We're Cookin'. David Novak said "We knew as soon as we got Now We're Cookin' out the door, perhaps even before it, that we were immediately going to go back and revisit our favourite, more rockier tracks from those sessions. They were songs that were rejected by our label for the album, but we didn't want to let them die. Revisiting them with a full four-piece live band really proved to ourselves that we made the right choice in sticking with them."

The duo, made up of David Novak and John-Henry Pajak assembled At Golden Retriever Studios in Sydney's with producer and mixer Wade Keighran and recent live band member Dan Cunningham to record the album in November 2021.

== Reception ==
Professional ratings
Review scores
Source	Rating
Backseat Mafia	8.5/10

Ellie Robinson from NME said "Though it's positioned as a sequel to last year's Now We're Cookin', the Sydney duo's fourth album instead flicks back to the gritty, overdriven rock'n'roll they turned heads en masse with in their earlier days. Hard, fast, fuzzy and funked-up, the soundscape commands your full attention, with David Novak's leather-jacket swagger and icy coolness impossible to ignore. It's a belting return to form for a band whose quality had started to slip, and one primed to shine especially well in the live realm."

Deb Pelser from Backseat Mafia said the album "is a rollicking barrel of fun with some wry humour and acute social observations that'll make you want to party like there's no tomorrow."

== Track listing ==
All songs written and performed by Polish Club, unless noted.

1. "Let's Go!" – 0:29
2. "Boys On Vacation" – 4:02
3. "Bad Vibrations" (co-written with James McComb) – 3:06
4. "Unstable" – 3:50
5. "David's Inferno" – 4:10
6. "Time Crisis II" – 3:16
7. "Like It Like That" – 4:02
8. "Get It Right" (co-written with James McComb) – 2:24
9. "End of the World" – 3:10
10. "¡Vamos!" – 1:27

== Charts ==
Chart performance for Now We're Cookin' in Hell
Chart (2022)	Peak position
Australian Artist Albums (ARIA)	20

== Release history ==
Release history and formats for Now We're Cookin' in Hell
Region	Date	Format	Label	Catalogue
Various	10 June 2022	Digital	Double Double; Island	—
Australia	22 July 2022	LP (limited to 500 copies)	Double Double; Island	4545724
