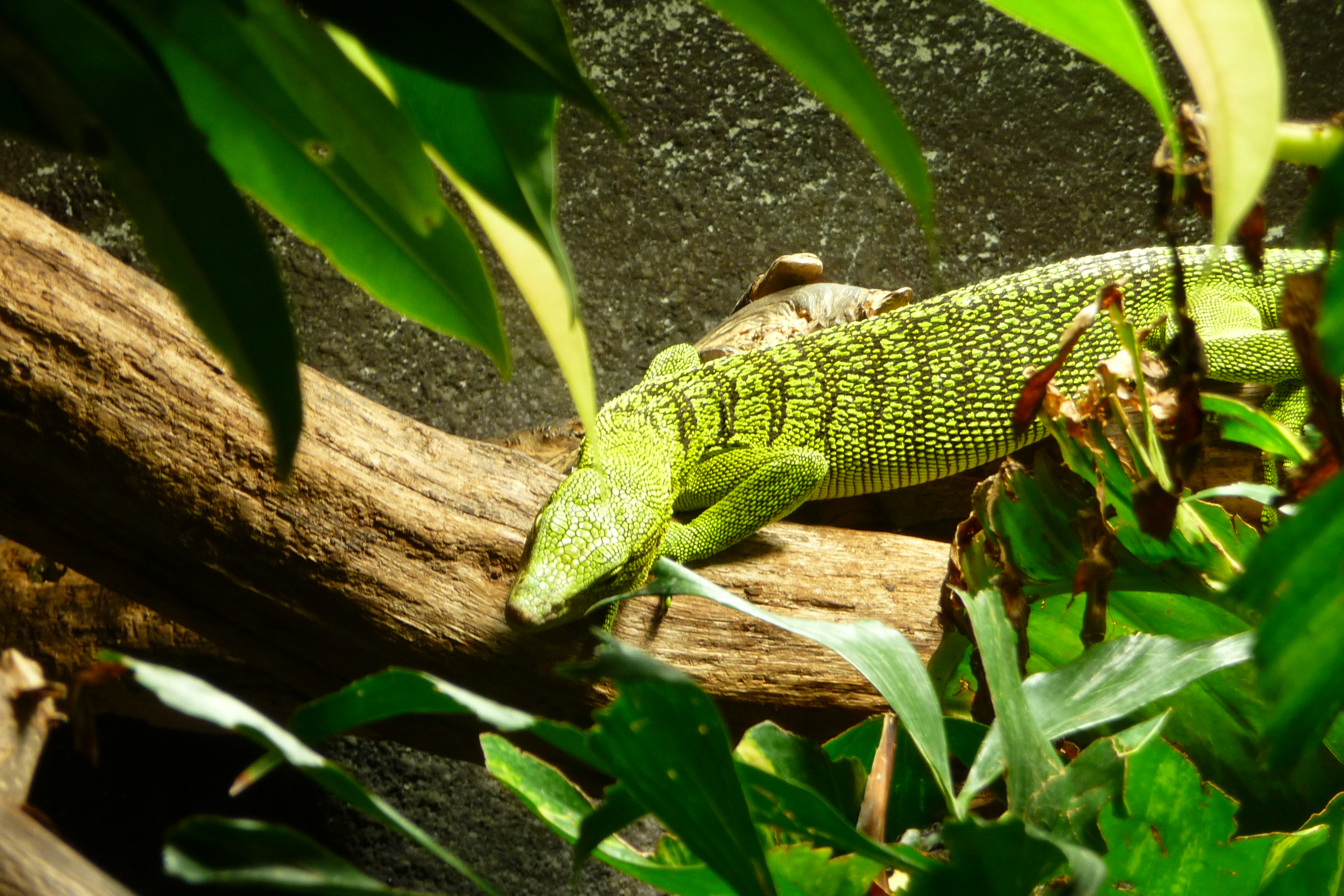

Conservation status
- Data Deficient (IUCN 3.1)

Scientific classification
- Kingdom: Animalia
- Phylum: Chordata
- Class: Reptilia
- Order: Squamata
- Suborder: Anguimorpha
- Family: Varanidae
- Genus: Varanus
- Subgenus: Hapturosaurus
- Species: V. reisingeri

Binomial name
- Varanus reisingeri Eidenmüller & Wicker, 2005

Synonyms
- Varanus reisingeri Eidenmüller & Wicker, 2005; Varanus (Euprepiosaurus) reisingeri — Ziegler et al. 2007; Varanus (Euprepiosaurus) prasinus reisingeri — Bucklitsch et al., 2016

= Varanus reisingeri =

Species of lizard

Varanus reisingeri, known commonly as Reisinger's tree monitor and the Yellow tree monitor, is a species of monitor lizard in the family Varanidae. The species is endemic to Indonesia. It was at one point at least considered an allopatric insular subspecies of the green tree monitor, due to physical and genetic similarities.

== Etymology ==
The specific name, reisingeri, is in honor of Manfred Reisinger, a German naturalist and reptile breeder.

== Geographic range ==
Varanus reisingeri is found on the island of Misool in West Papua, Indonesia.

== Habitat ==
The natural habitat of V. reisingeri is forest, from sea level to an altitude of 535 m (1,755 ft).
