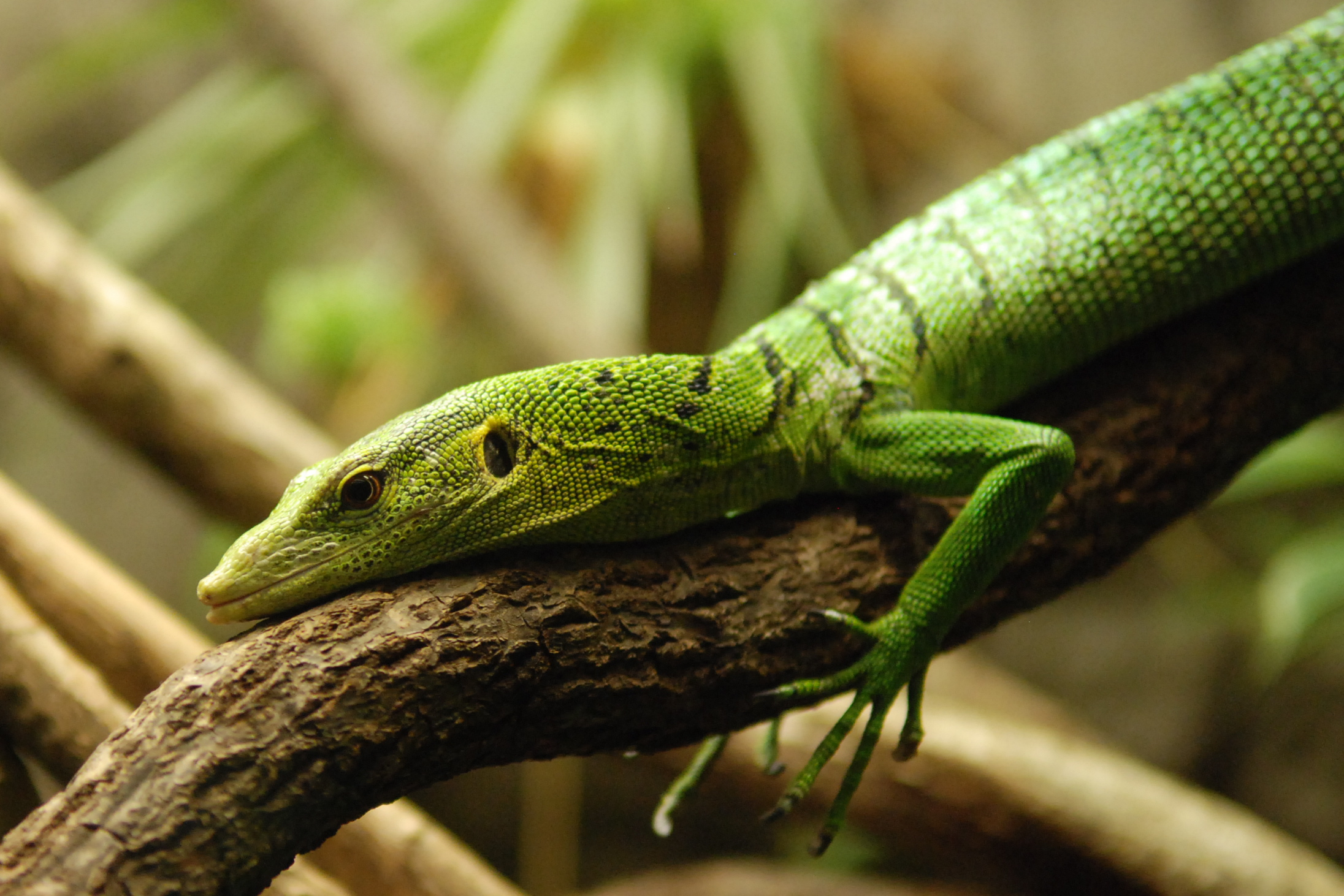
- Green tree monitor (Varanus prasinus)

Scientific classification
- Kingdom: Animalia
- Phylum: Chordata
- Class: Reptilia
- Order: Squamata
- Suborder: Anguimorpha
- Family: Varanidae
- Genus: Varanus
- Subgenus: Hapturosaurus; Bucklitsch, Böhme, and Koch, 2016

Type species
- Varanus prasinus Schlegel, 1844

Species
- V. beccarii; V. boehmei; V. bogerti; V. keithhornei; V. kordensis; V. macraei; V. prasinus; V. reisingeri; V. telenesetes

= Varanus (Hapturosaurus) =

Subgenus of reptiles

Hapturosaurus, sometimes known as the tree monitors, is a subgenus of lizards, consisting of slender-bodied arboreal monitor lizards mostly found in the tropical rainforests of Indonesia and Papua New Guinea.

== Taxonomy ==
The type species is the green tree monitor, originally designated by Hermann Schlegel in 1844 as Monitor prasinus. Robert Mertens placed tree monitors within the subgenus Odatria in 1942. In 1988, tree monitors were instead placed within Euprepiosaurus alongside the mangrove monitors. Nevertheless, there was a distinction between mangrove and tree monitors that was clear even then, so Euprepriosaurus was commonly considered to consist of two species complexes, i.e., the V. indicus complex and the V. prasinus complex. In 2016, Yannick Bucklitsch, Wolfgang Böhme, and André Koch found the two species complexes sufficiently morphologically, ecologically, and biologically distinct, and so all species within the V. prasinus complex were moved under a newly erected subgenus, i.e., Hapturosaurus. Hapturosaurus diverged from Euprepriosaurus during the late Miocene.

=== Etymology ===
The name Hapturosaurus is derived from the Greek words "haptein" (to grasp), "ouros" (tail), and "sauros" (lizard), in reference to the prehensile tails of tree monitors.

== Ecology ==
=== Behaviour ===
All species are highly arboreal. In captivity, tree monitors demonstrate the capacity to play, in the form of destructive behaviour such as systematically shredding the leaves on plants with teeth and claws. Play-like behaviour is also documented in other less closely related monitor species, such as Komodo dragons.

=== Feeding habits ===
Tree monitors are primarily insectivorous, but also consume other small invertebrates such as spiders, or occasionally small mammals, lizards or the nestlings and eggs of birds. In captivity they are occasionally seen eating plants although the gut contents of wild individuals were not reported to contain plant matter. This may however be a result of accidentally ingesting leaves when playing with them, which is documented in captivity.

Captive hatchling often refuse food for more than two weeks, although force feeding may be recommended before then and until they begin feeding by themselves.

Like other monitor lizards, tree monitors are highly intelligent reptiles, but tree monitors demonstrate particularly complex problem solving abilities, fine motor coordination, and skilled forelimb movements when hunting prey. When they cannot reach prey in tight crevices and holes with their jaws, they instead extract prey by reaching for it with their forelimbs—which are some of the longest and most slender forelimbs of all monitors and end in elongated digits tipped with large claws and adhesive soles—and hooking it out with its claws, allowing them to exploit a wider range of niches.

It is recommended that in captivity this behaviour be encouraged by placing food items in places that are only accessible by reaching for them with their forelimbs, as a form of enrichment.

== Range ==
Most species are allopatric and confined to single islands in Indonesia and Papua New Guinea, with the exception of the canopy goanna which is endemic to northeast Australia and the green tree monitor which has a much wider distribution than other tree monitors. The green tree monitor has even been purportedly sighted on the Cape York Peninsula on multiple instances, which if true would make it sympatric with the canopy goanna.

Their colonization of the Indo-Pacific islands occurred during the Pleistocene glacial periods, when lower global sea levels caused the Sahul Shelf to form a continuous land-bridge out of the shallow waters around the Torres Strait Islands. This allowed the exchange and dispersal of fauna between New Guinea and Australia each time the land-bridge formed.

== Venom ==
Like all other monitor lizards, tree monitors possess venom glands in their lower jaws, giving them a noticeably venomous bite. The venom is an anticoagulant, and has two known mechanisms for disrupting blood clotting: by fibrinogenolysis (the destructive cleavage of fibrinogen) and by blocking platelet aggregation. The venom also causes hypotension. Monitor lizard venom is extremely complex and diverse due to the great range of ecological niches that they occupy.

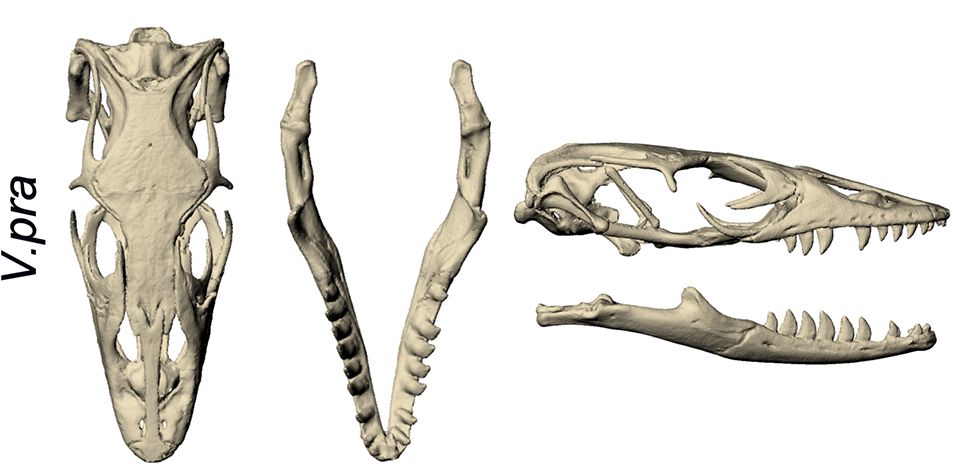
Emerald tree monitor skull.

Tree monitors have the most potently fibrinogenolytic venoms of all monitor lizards, matched only by the also arboreal banded monitor from the subgenus Odatria. This may be because arboreal monitor species experience strong selection pressure to quickly subjugate prey items before they break free and escape by falling out of the trees or flying away. As fibrinogenolytic activity is not painful, the venom likely has a primarily predatory role in subjugating prey, instead of acting as a predator deterrent.

It is suggested that higher prey escape potential may cause increased venom potency, as the lethally toxic eastern green mamba and boomslang are also arboreal. This may also apply to the piscivorous and highly venomous cone snails, given their highly mobile fish prey.

As the venom is an anticoagulant, monitor lizard bites often bleed far more than what the mechanical damage of the bite alone would have induced.

== Species ==
Species	Taxon Author	Common name	Picture
V. beccarii	Doria, 1874	black tree monitor	
V. boehmei	Jacob, 2003	golden-spotted tree monitor	
V. bogerti	Mertens, 1950	Bogert's monitor	
V. keithhornei	Wells & Wellington, 1985	canopy goanna	
V. kordensis	A.B. Meyer, 1874	Biak tree monitor	
V. macraei	Böhme & Jacobs, 2001	blue tree monitor	
V. prasinus	Schlegel, 1839	green tree monitor	
V. reisingeri	Eidenmüller & Wicker, 2005	yellow tree monitor	
V. telenesetes	Sprackland, 1991	mysterious tree monitor	
