= Guana =

Guana may refer to:

== Places ==
- Guana Island, an island in the British Virgin Islands
- Guiana Island (Antigua and Barbuda), also called Guana Island, off Antigua
- Guana River, in Guana Tolomato Matanzas National Estuarine Research Reserve, in Florida, U.S.

== Languages ==
- Guana language (Brazil), a language of the Brazilian Terêna
- Guana language (Paraguay), a language of the Paraguayan Chaco

== Other uses ==
- Guana people, or Chané, an ethnic group in Paraguay, Bolivia, Argentina, and Brazil
- Roberto Guana (born 1981), footballer

== See also ==
- Guyana (disambiguation)
- Iguana (disambiguation)
