= Varanus telenesetes =

Conservation status
- Data Deficient (IUCN 3.1)

Scientific classification
- Kingdom: Animalia
- Phylum: Chordata
- Class: Reptilia
- Order: Squamata
- Suborder: Anguimorpha
- Family: Varanidae
- Genus: Varanus
- Subgenus: Hapturosaurus
- Species: V. telenesetes

Binomial name
- Varanus telenesetes Sprackland, 1991

Species of lizard

Varanus telenesetes, the mysterious tree monitor, is an enigmatic monitor lizard that may actually represent a colour faded specimen of the green tree monitor. The species was described based on a single specimen supposedly collected on Rossel Island in the Louisiade Archipelago of Papua New Guinea. However, later searches of this island have failed to turn up any specimens and native islanders deny ever seeing it. It is now believed that the original collection data was in error and that the species occurs on some other, currently unknown, island east of New Guinea.

== Description ==
Like all tree monitors, the body is slender with a long, prehensile tail (~2 times the SVL). It was originally described by Robert Sprackland in 1991 as being similar to the green tree monitor; it was dorsally green with indistinct black chevrons, and the nape and tail were visibly dark green. However, the specimen in question has since become entirely dark grey, appearing as if it was melanistic. It lacks a visible dorsal pattern unless held under alcohol, at which point narrow dark crossbands can be faintly seen. The underside is cream-colored with deep brown spots and the throat is banded. Unique for tree monitors, the tongue color is yellow (vs. pink) and the soles of the hands and feet are light-colored (vs. dark). The total length of the known specimen is just over two feet (0.6 m), though it is likely that this represents an animal not fully grown as most tree monitors average a total length of around three feet (0.9 m).
