= Live & Horny at the Corner =

Live album by Polish Club
- Released: 24 October 2020
- Recorded: 7 July 2018 at Corner Hotel, Richmond, Victoria
- Label: Double Double Trouble, Island

Polish Club chronology
Nye_2020_megamix.exe (2019)	Live & Horny at the Corner (2020)	Now We're Cookin' (2021)

Live & Horny at the Corner is the first live album by Australian garage duo, Polish Club. It was received a limited released of 250 copies on vinyl for 2020 Australian Record Store Day on 24 October 2020. The album was recorded on 7 July 2018 at Corner Hotel, Richmond, Victoria, during The Polish Club With Horns tour.

The album did not enter the ARIA Top 100 Album Chart but peaked at number 9 on the ARIA Vinyl Album Chart.

== Track listing ==
Side A
No.	Title	Length
1.	"Intro"	0:34
2.	"Gimme Money (styled as "Gimme $$$")"	3:29
3.	"Watchuknow"	2:04
4.	"Back 2 U"	3:50
5.	"Beeping"	2:43
6.	"How to Be Alone (styled as "How 2 B Alone")"	3:02
7.	"Where U Been?"	2:07
8.	"Come Party (styled as "Come Partay")"	2:54

Side B
No.	Title	Length
1.	"Don't Fuck Me Over"	2:46
2.	"Divided (styled as "÷")"	4:43
3.	"Major"	4:25
4.	"Beat Up"	2:36
5.	"Able"	4:25

== Charts ==
Chart performance for Live & Horny at the Corner
Chart (2020)	Peak position
Australian Vinyl Albums (ARIA)	9

== Release history ==
Release history and formats for Live & Horny at the Corner
Region	Date	Format	Label	Catalogue
Australia	24 October 2020	LP (limited to 250 copies)	Double Double Records, Island Records	0730104
