= Alright Already (album) =

Studio album by Polish Club
- Released: 30 March 2017
- Recorded: 2016
- Studios: Linear Studios, Sydney, Australia
- Labels: Double Double; Universal
- Producer: Wade Keighran

Polish Club chronology
Polish Club (2015)	Alright Already (2017)	Okie Dokie (2017)

Singles from Alright Already
- 1. "Beat Up" Released: November 2016; 2. "Come Party" Released: 17 February 2017; 3. "Divided" Released: May 2017

Alright Already is the debut studio album by Australian garage duo, Polish Club. It was released on 30 March 2017 and peaked at number 19 on the Australian ARIA Albums Chart.

The album cover features the duo standing outside a Polish club in the Sydney suburb of Ashfield with the duo saying "It was already there, it was cheap and easy, we didn't have to choose a font."

The album was supported with the Alright Already National Tour, commencing in May 2017.

The album was nominated for Best Rock Album at the ARIA Music Awards of 2017.

== Reception ==
Professional ratings
Review scores
Source	Rating
The AU Review	7.7/10
The Brag Media	4/5 stars
Impact Nottingham	7.5/10
The Sydney Morning Herald	3.5/5 stars

David James Young from The Brag Media said "Polish Club have been pushing their blend of vintage soul, garage rock and the dirty side of the blues for a few years now. In turn, their debut LP is equal parts concerted effort and impulsive release – one that's been a long time coming, so it charges out of the gates the second you press 'play'."

Dylan Marshall from The AU Review called it "a blistering debut album" saying "Polish Club have kept to their strengths and delivered an album that will without a doubt sound shit-hot in a live setting."

Music Feeds said "[Polish Club have] graced us with a highly original, daring release in Alright Already, which should be admired. Ultimately, this debut record is better than good. It's bloody great."

Celeste Adams from "Impact Nottingham" said "Whilst not quite flawless, the electrifying soul-punk vibes across all fourteen tracks makes it a strong debut and a great addition to any summer playlist. "

== Track listing ==
All songs written and performed by Polish Club, unless noted.

1. "Where U Been? " – 2:11
2. "Come Party" – 2:48
3. "If It Was Me" – 3:39
4. "Beat Up" – 2:37
5. "Why Should I" – 3:24
6. "Watchuknow" – 2:01
7. "How to Be Alone" – 3:05
8. "Broke" – 3:18
9. "Beeping" – 2:35
10. "Shark Attack! " – 1:41
11. "Able" – 3:23
12. "Divided" – 3:29
13. "My Delight" – 2:52
14. "Red River Rock" (Johnny and the Hurricanes) – 1:59

== Charts ==
The album debuted and peaked at number 19 on the ARIA Charts for the week commencing 10 April 2017.

Chart performance for Alright Already
Chart (2017)	Peak position
Australian Albums (ARIA)	19

== Release history ==
Release history and formats for Alright Already
Region	Date	Format	Label	Catalogue	Version	Reference
Australia	30 March 2017	CD	Double Double; Universal	POLISH007	Original album	
Various	7 April 2017	LP; digital	Double Double; Universal	POLISH004-POLISH005	Original album	
Australia	7 April 2017	CS (limited to 120)	Double Double; Universal	POLISH006	Alright Already Demos	
Europe	10 August 2018	CD, LP, digital	Double Double; Universal		Original album	
Australia	September 2018	LP (Clear, limited Edition)	Double Double; Universal	POLISH013	Reissue	
