= Polish Club (band) =

Australian garage rock duo

- Origin: Sydney, Australia
- Genre: Garage rock revival
- Years active: 2014–present
- Labels: Double Double; Universal Australia; Island Australia
- Members: David Novak; John-Henry Pajak
- Website: polishclub.co

Polish Club are an Australian garage rock duo from Sydney, New South Wales, formed in 2014. The band consists of vocalist and guitarist David Novak and drummer John-Henry Pajak. As of 2025, they have released six studio albums. At the APRA Music Awards of 2024, they won the award for Most Performed Rock Work.

== Career ==
=== 2014–2015: Formation and debut EPs ===
Vocalist and guitarist David Novak and drummer John-Henry Pajak started the band in 2014. Originally a four-piece, they decided to go their own way, telling SBS News in 2017, "We halved the numbers and booked a room for three hours, and we had five or six songs." The duo's name refers to both members having Polish descent.

Polish club uploaded the songs "Able" and "Show You Love" onto Triple J Unearthed on 5 January 2015, followed by "Did Somebody Tell Me", on 2 February 2015. Nick Hartman from Happy Mag reviewed all three, saying, "'Able' is probably the best of their three songs so far."

The duo released their self-titled debut EP in October 2015, with Hartman saying, "Polish Club by Polish Club is overall an effort [they] can be proud of, with Novak and JH displaying a high minimum standard."

=== 2016–2019: Alright Already and Iguana ===
In March 2016, Polish Club released the double-A sided single "My House"/"Blood and Bone" digitally and on 7" vinyl. Shayen de Silva of Happy Mag wrote, "My House is the house party banger you'll be spinning all night long."

In November 2016, the band released "Beat Up".

In February 2017, they issued "Come Party" and announced their debut studio album, Alright Already, alongside a national tour. Alright Already was released in March 2017 and peaked at number 19 on the ARIA charts. At the ARIA Music Awards of 2017, it was nominated for Best Rock Album.

In October 2017, the duo surprised fans with the release of the six-track EP Okie Dokie, featuring the single "Gimme Money".

In November 2017, Polish Club published the double-A sided single "All I Want for Christmas Is You"/"I Hate You But You Gotta Stay (On Christmas Day)". Singer-guitarist Novak said,, "I've always loved Mariah Carey in general and especially that song. We tried it one night a few Decembers ago and more people than we expected knew it, and it turns out loved it too. 'I Hate You But You Gotta Stay (On Christmas Day)' is a tongue-in-cheek comment on how Christmas brings everyone together, regardless of how you might feel about them." The tour A Christmas in December followed in 2017.

In February 2018, the duo released a limited-edition 7" vinyl cover of Savage Garden's "Truly Madly Deeply".

In October 2018, Polish Club issued the song "Clarity", stating, "It's about the struggle of communication; not being able or eloquent or ballsy enough to say what you're thinking; being at the end of your tether with confusion, wanting to be clear with yourself and others."

This was followed by "We Don't Care" in March 2019. The duo said, "'We Don't Care' came out of a really tough couple of months for both of us. We [had] a long, dry spell of writing and recording. Coupled with multiple overseas trips and personal hard times, we were just fucking rinsed. I think the song is about how when your life is going to shit, the things you do to try and escape it often makes it worse. When you say you don't care about something, it's just a way of running away and not facing up to your problems."

The pair's second studio album, Iguana, was announced in April 2019 and released in June of that year. It peaked at number 20 on the ARIA charts.

In December 2019, Polish Club released the 7-track EP Nye_2020_megamix.exe, which featured six covers of their favourite party starter songs. Novak said, "After using Christmas and Valentine's Day for our own personal gain, we are starting to run out of holidays to turn into a gimmick, but fortunately there was still New Year's for us to exploit. We wanted to write new music but we also wanted to make a megamix of bangers like they used to do (I don't know who they are, but I feel like that was something they did). So once again, we've managed to turn taking the piss into something we took completely serious. Anyway, it was something to do…"

=== 2020–2022: Now We're Cookin' and Now We're Cookin' in Hell ===
In January 2020, Polish Club released "Shout", a song they had submitted to represent Australia in the Eurovision Song Contest, but which did not make the shortlist. Money raised from its sale went to the Australian Red Cross.

In November 2020, they published "Just Talking", the lead single from their forthcoming third studio album. The song's lyrics make an impassioned plea to everyone for patience and understanding, asking listeners to lean away from the impulse to resort to hyperbole and hostility and calm down a little in an increasingly turbulent time.

In June 2021, the duo released "Whack", the fourth single from Now We're Cookin', and announced a national tour. Now We're Cookin' came out in August 2021 and peaked at number 8 on the ARIA charts.

In April 2022, Polish Club announced the release of their fourth album, Now We're Cookin' in Hell, and issued the double-A sided single "Boys on Vacation"/"Bad Vibrations". On "Boys on Vacation", the group take aim at Australian Prime Minister Scott Morrison and his notorious absence during the 2019–20 Australian bushfire season, when he was on holiday in Hawaii. "Bad Vibrations" rolls its eyes sarcastically at things that don't work properly in the city of Sydney, such as trams not fitting properly on tracks and ferries that are too high.

=== 2023–present: Heavy Weight Heart ===
In February 2023, the band released "Good Time", with Novak saying, "We wanted a short, sharp song filled with nothing but catchphrases, with each part being its own hook. I think we nailed it." The Nine Network is using the song for their coverage of the National Rugby League in 2023.

In July 2024, the band announced their upcoming fourth album, Heavy Weight Heart, scheduled for release in September. The record was preceded by the singles "Manila", "Heavy Weight", and "How Dare You Fall in Love in This City".

== Band members ==
Current members

- David Novak – lead vocals, guitar (2014–present)
- John-Henry Pajak – drums, percussion, backing vocals (2014–present)

Current touring musicians

- Wade Keighran – bass, backing vocals (2018–2019, 2022–present), sampler, percussion (2018–2019)
- Tom Hogan – keyboards, guitar (2024–present), bass (2019), backing vocals (2019, 2024–present)

Former touring musicians

- Kirsty Tickle – keyboards, saxophone, percussion, backing vocals (2020–2022)
- Dan Cunningham – guitar (2022), bass (2020–2022), backing vocals (2020–2022)

== Discography ==
=== Studio albums ===
List of studio albums, with release date, label, and selected chart positions shown
Title	Album details	Peak chart positions
Title	Album details	AUS
Alright Already	Released: 30 March 2017; Label: Double Double, Universal; Formats: CD, LP, cassette, digital download, streaming	19
Iguana	Released: 7 June 2019; Label: Double Double, Island, Universal; Formats: CD, LP, digital download, streaming	20
Now We're Cookin'	Released: 13 August 2021; Label: Double Double, Island, Universal; Formats: CD, LP, digital download, streaming	8
Now We're Cookin' in Hell	Released: 10 June 2022; Label: Double Double, Island, Universal; Formats: LP, digital download, streaming	— (Note: Now We're Cookin' in Hell did not enter the ARIA Top 100 Album Chart but peaked at number 20 on the Australian Artists Album Chart.)
Heavy Weight Heart	Released: 13 September 2024; Label: Polish Club Music; Formats: LP, digital download, streaming	— (Note: Heavy Weight Heart did not enter the ARIA Top 100 Album Chart but peaked at number 16 on the Australian Artists Album Chart.)
Pound Cake	Released: 23 May 2025; Label: Polish Club Music; Formats: LP, digital download, streaming	—
Christmas Stinks!	Released: 1 December 2025; Label: Polish Club Music; Formats: LP, digital download, streaming	84
"—" denotes a recording that did not chart.

=== Live albums ===
List of live albums, with release date, label, and selected chart positions shown
Title	Album details	Peak chart positions
Title	Album details	AUS Vinyl
Live & Horny at the Corner	Released: 24 October 2020; Label: Double Double, Island (0730104); Formats: LP (Limited to 250 copies)	9

=== EPs ===
List of EPs, with release date and label shown
Title	EP details
Polish Club	Released: 23 October 2015; Label: Polish Club Music (POLISH001); Formats: CD, digital download, streaming
Okie Dokie	Released: 18 October 2017; Label: Double Double, Island (POLISH008); Formats: LP, digital download, streaming
Nye_2020_megamix.exe	Released: 6 December 2019; Label: Polish Club Music, Island; Formats: Digital download, streaming

=== Singles ===
List of singles, with year released and album name shown
Title	Year	Album
"Able"	2015	Polish Club
"Show You Love"	2015	Non-album single
"Did Somebody Tell Me"	2015	Polish Club
"Beeping"	2015	Polish Club
"My House"/"Blood and Bone"	2016	Non-album single
"Beat Up"	2016	Alright Already
"Come Party"	2017	Alright Already
"Divided"	2017	Alright Already
"Gimme Money"	2017	Okie Dokie
"All I Want for Christmas Is You"/ "I Hate You But You Gotta Stay (On Christmas Day)"	2017	Non-album singles
"Truly Madly Deeply"	2018	Non-album singles
"Clarity"	2018	Iguana
"We Don't Care"	2019	Iguana
"Countdown"	2019	Nye_2020_megamix.exe
"Shout"	2020	Non-album single
"Just Talking"	2020	Now We're Cookin'
"Stop for a Minute"	2021	Now We're Cookin'
"No Heaven"	2021	Now We're Cookin'
"Whack"	2021	Now We're Cookin'
"Baby We're Burning"	2021	Now We're Cookin'
"Unstable"	2022	Now We're Cookin' in Hell
"Boys on Vacation" / "Bad Vibrations"	2022	Now We're Cookin' in Hell
"The Cup of Life"	2022	Non-album singles
"Good Time"	2023	Non-album singles
"Manila"	2024	Heavy Weight Heart
"Heavy Weight"	2024	Heavy Weight Heart
"How Dare You Fall in Love in This City"	2024	Heavy Weight Heart
"Tied in a Knot"	2024	Heavy Weight Heart
"Repeating Repeating"	2024	Heavy Weight Heart
"Turn Me On"	2025	Non-album single
"Take It" / "S.N.A.F.U."	2025	Pound Cake
"Something on the Side" (feat. Dobby) / "Brand New Jet Ski"	2025	Pound Cake

== Awards and nominations ==
=== ARIA Music Awards ===
The ARIA Music Awards is an annual awards ceremony that recognises excellence, innovation, and achievement across all genres of Australian music.

Year	Nominee / work	Award	Result	Ref.
2017	Alright Already	Best Rock Album	Nominated	

=== APRA Awards ===
The APRA Awards are held in Australia and New Zealand by the Australasian Performing Right Association to recognise songwriting skills, sales, and airplay performance by its members annually. Polish Club have been nominated for one award.

Year	Nominee / work	Award	Result	Ref.
2020	"Clarity"	Most Performed Rock Work of the Year	Nominated	
2024	"Good Time"	Most Performed Rock Work	Won	
