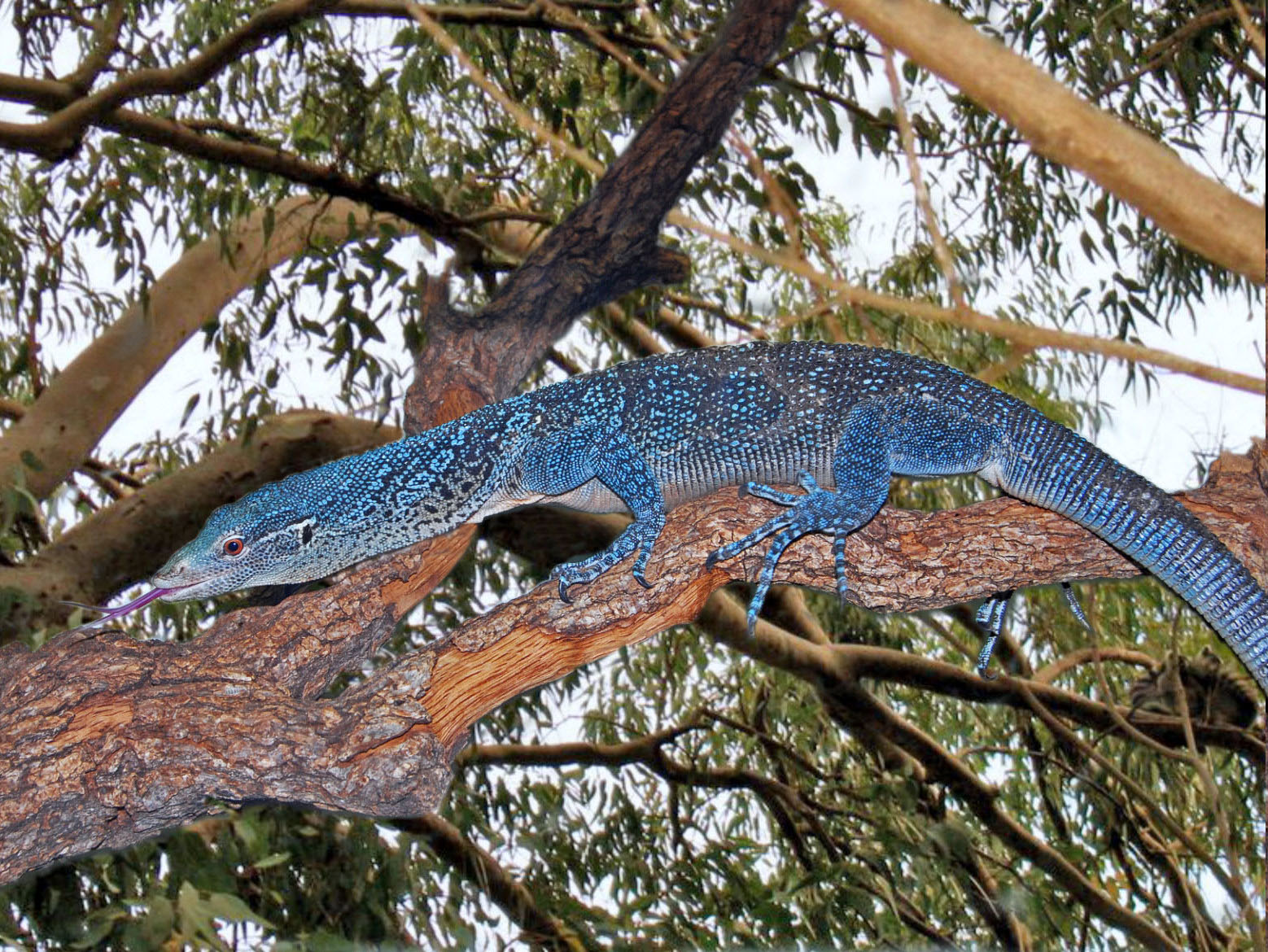

Conservation status
- Endangered (IUCN 3.1)

Scientific classification
- Kingdom: Animalia
- Phylum: Chordata
- Class: Reptilia
- Order: Squamata
- Suborder: Anguimorpha
- Family: Varanidae
- Genus: Varanus
- Subgenus: Hapturosaurus
- Species: V. macraei

Binomial name
- Varanus macraei Böhme & Jacobs, 2001

Synonyms
- Varanus macraei Böhme & Jacobs, 2001; Varanus (Euprepiosaurus) macraei — Ziegler et al., 2007; Varanus macraei — LiVigni, 2013: 279

= Varanus macraei =

Species of monitor lizard

Varanus macraei, also known commonly as the blue-spotted tree monitor and the blue tree monitor, is a species of monitor lizard endemic to the island of Batanta in Indonesia. The species is named after herpetologist Duncan Malcolm MacRae.

== Geographic range ==
The distribution of Varanus macraei is restricted to the island of Batanta, on the northwestern tip of the Vogelkop peninsula of Irian Jaya of Indonesia. Like the other members of the prasinus-group, it is a tree climber, with a prehensile tail. This may be the smallest distribution of any tree monitor, as this island has a size of only 450 km^{2}, comparable with Lake Constance of Central Europe.

== Habitat ==
The blue-spotted tree monitor inhabits tropical forests that average 28–38 °C (83–100 °F). In the dry season the humidity is around 65%, but it spikes to 100% in the wet season.

== Discovery ==
Reports of a large blue arboreal lizard on Batanta, an island off the northwestern tip of the Bird's Head Peninsula of West Papua, reached Duncan MacRae, founder of the reptile park "Rimba" on Bali, in 2000. MacRae travelled to Sorong and continued by boat to Batanta, where local residents confirmed their familiarity with the animal and described it climbing on tree trunks and branches. Guided by local people to sites where the lizards had been seen, MacRae located the species in forest on Batanta and noted its resemblance in form to the green tree monitor (Varanus prasinus), from which it differed in colouration. Four specimens were collected and taken to Bali.[Reisinger 2014]

MacRae photographed the animals and contacted the German herpetologist Wolfgang Böhme, who examined them and concluded that they represented an undescribed species rather than a colour variant. The species was formally described in 2001 by Böhme and Hans J. Jacobs from a semiadult female holotype (ZFMK 74558) and a single paratype, with Batanta given as the type locality, and was named Varanus macraei in MacRae's honour.[Böhme & Jacobs 2001; Reptile Database]

== Description ==
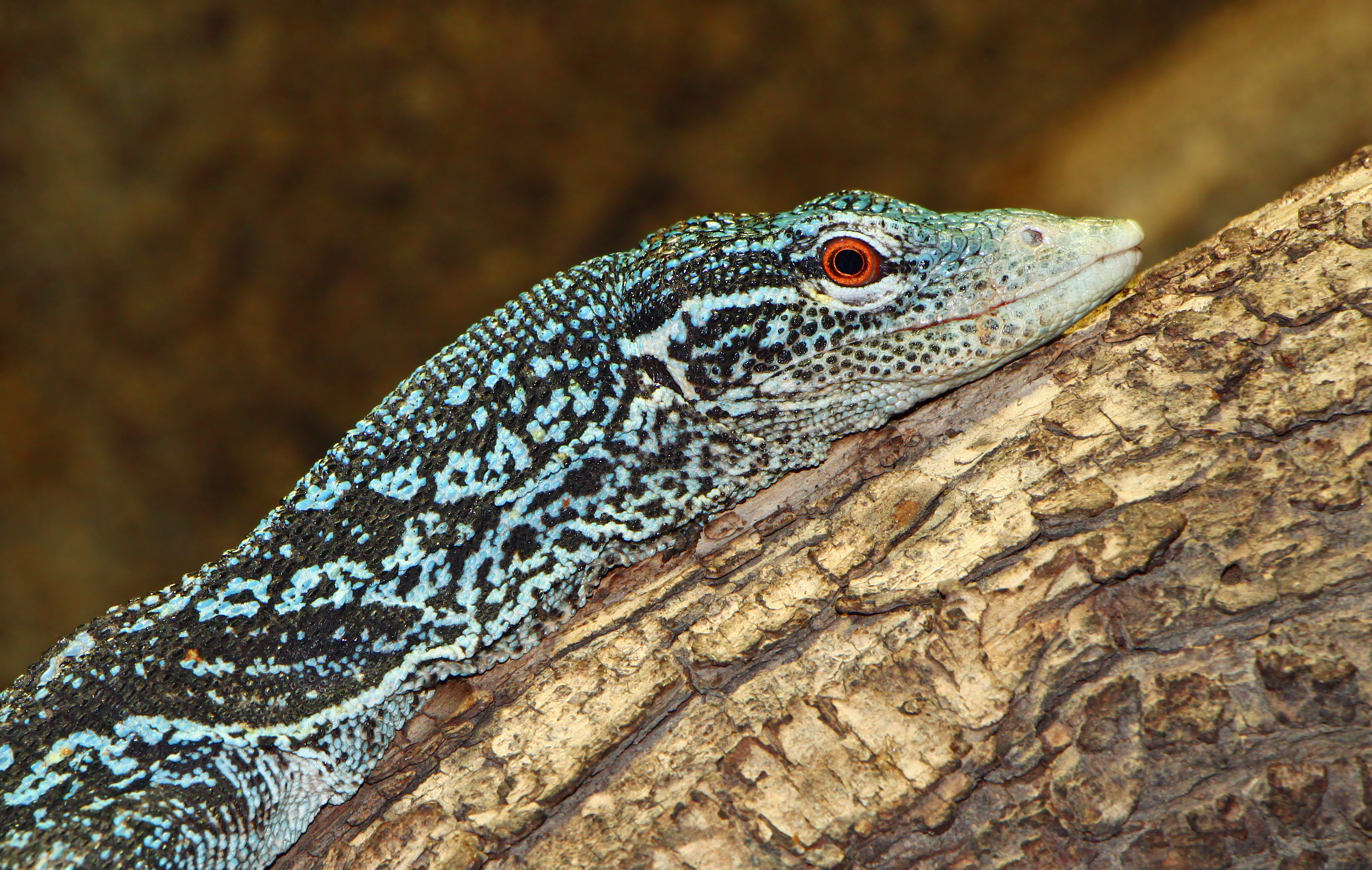
Head

Varanus macraei is part of the prasinus-group and the subgenus (Hapturosaurus). As its common names suggest, it is black with scattered blue scales, forming ocellations that may in turn form bands across the back. The tip of the snout is light blue, and the lower jaw is white with uniform green scales along the neck, forming a v-shaped pattern. There are fewer than nine dorsal crossbands, and the legs are heavily spotted with turquoise ocelli. There are 85–103 scale rows at midbody. A single distinct blue scale row stretches from the lower angle of the eye to the upper edge of the ear. The throat is light with dark spots forming a reticulated pattern. Like all members of the prasinus-group, with 22–23 more or less symmetrical blue rings, the tail is prehensile and about 1.95 times as long as the snout-to-vent length (SVL).

Male blue-spotted monitors reach a larger maximum size than female blue-spotted monitors, and males can be distinguished by the comparatively broader temporal region and distinct hemipenal bulges posterolateral to the cloaca. Adult male blue-spotted monitors may reach 1.1 m (3.5 ft) in total length (tail included), and female blue-spotted monitors are about 10 cm (4 in) shorter than the male blue-spotted monitors, making V. macraei the largest known species of the V. prasinus complex.

== Behavior and diet ==
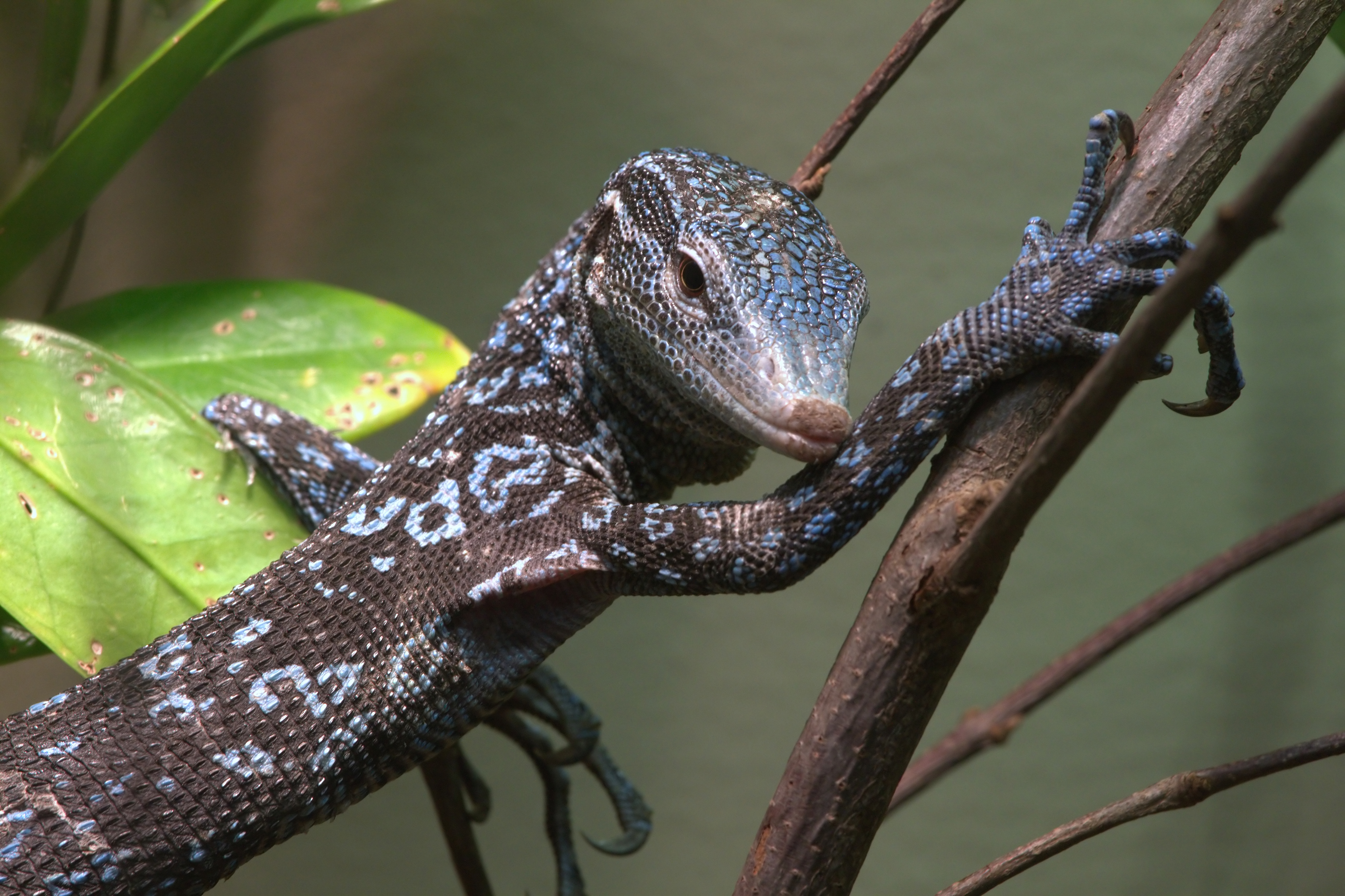
Detail of head and upper body

Varanus macreai is diurnal and arboreal; thus it avoids predators by fleeing up a tree and keeping the trunk between itself and the intruder, as many anoles do. No studies have been published on the diet of V. macraei, but it is likely primarily made up of (in order) stick insects, orthopterans (grasshoppers, katydids and crickets), moths, beetles, smaller lizards, small eggs, and the occasional berry.

== Reproduction ==
Varanus macreai is oviparous.

== History ==
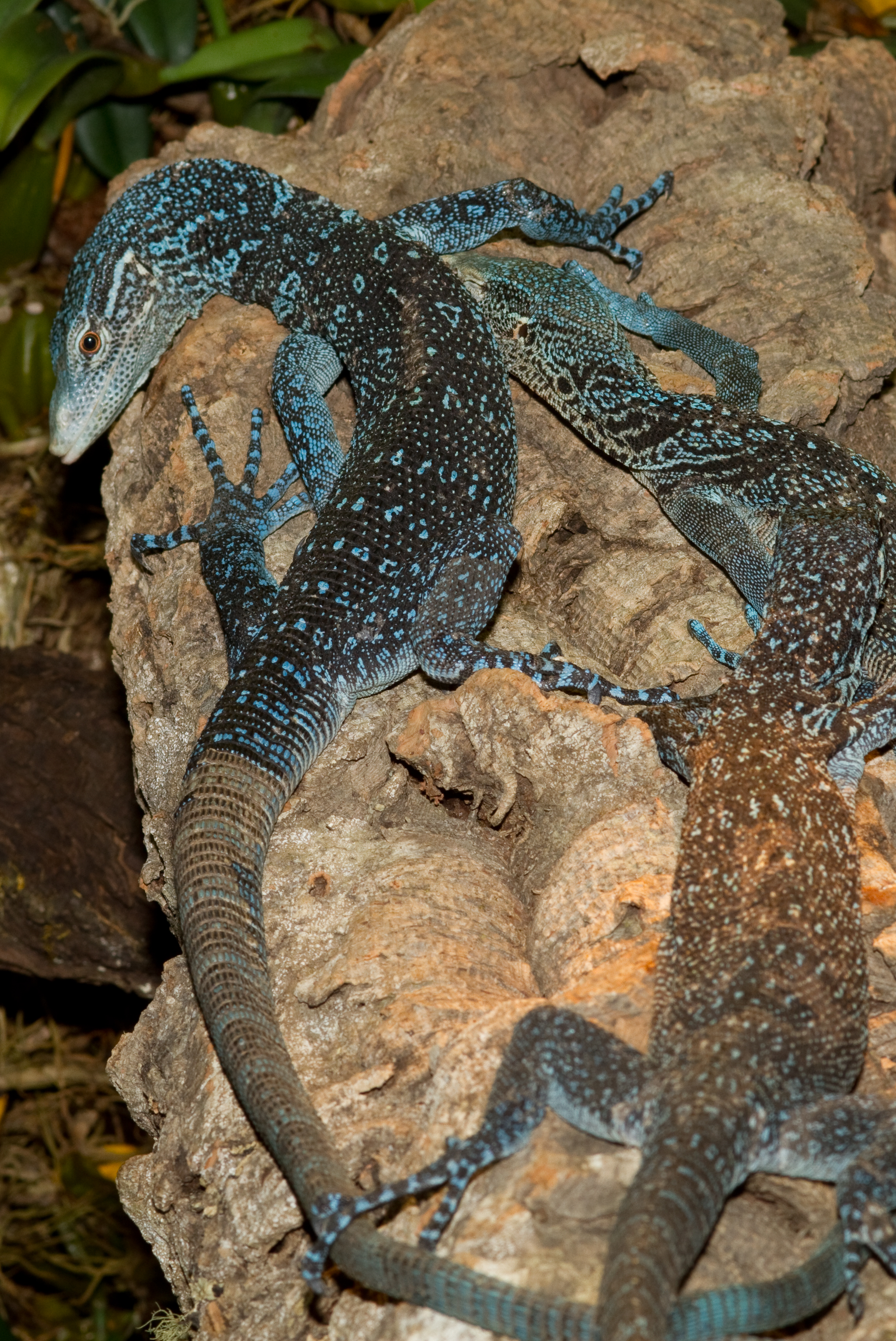
A group of three individuals

As recently as a decade ago, only five species comprised the tree monitor group: Varanus prasinus, V. beccarii, V. bogerti, V. keithhornei, and V. telenesetes. In the early years of the 21st century, that number has been supplemented with the discoveries and naming of V. macraei, V. boehmei, and V. reisingeri. The considerable similarity among these species made them difficult to differentiate. Some individuals of the decidedly green V. prasinus have very little yellow pigmentation, and thus appear pale blue. Varanus reisingeri can very well be described as looking like V. prasinus without blue pigmentation. While there are very few reports—and no specific field studies—relating to the natural history of any of the tree monitors, there is a considerable body of knowledge available for the green tree monitor (V. prasinus) and the black tree monitor (V. beccarii), two of the species that have been very successfully maintained and bred in captivity for more than two decades. Consequently, several herpetoculturists and at least two zoos, such as the Cincinnati Zoo and the Virginia Zoo, have now kept and bred the blue-spotted monitor (V. macraei).

Varanus macraei is sought after for the international pet trade. Illegal and unsustainable collection and trade of Varanus macraei is causing a decline in the wild population and is likely a threat to the long term survival of this species in the wild. As Varanus macraei is a protected species in Indonesia, there is no legal collection of the species from the wild.
