= Canopy goanna =

Conservation status
- Least Concern (IUCN 3.1)

Scientific classification
- Kingdom: Animalia
- Phylum: Chordata
- Class: Reptilia
- Order: Squamata
- Suborder: Anguimorpha
- Family: Varanidae
- Genus: Varanus
- Subgenus: Hapturosaurus
- Species: V. keithhornei

Binomial name
- Varanus keithhornei Wells & Wellington, 1985

Synonyms
- Varanus teriae Sprackland, 1991

Species of lizard

Varanus keithhornei, commonly known as the canopy goanna, Keith Horne's monitor, blue-nosed tree monitor, or Nesbit River monitor, is a species of monitor lizards native to northeast Australia. It is a member of the Varanus prasinus species group.

This monitor lizard is found in a restricted area of less than 100 km^{2} near the Claudie and Nesbit rivers, in the McIlwraith and Iron Ranges of the Cape York Peninsula in northern Queensland.

== Description ==
The colouration of V. keithhornei is dark black on the upper side. It has moderately big and smooth head scales. Its tail has no visible keel. The canopy goanna is small for a monitor lizard, reaching a total length up to 77 cm, but more robust than other species of the V. prasinus species complex, and can be further distinguished from them by its colour and the conical throat scales.

Specimens were originally assigned to the species Varanus prasinus by Czechura in 1980, but Wells and Wellington declared it a new species 5 years later.

== Diet ==
They forage in the trees and the leaf litter for insects such as orthopterans, roaches, and beetles.
