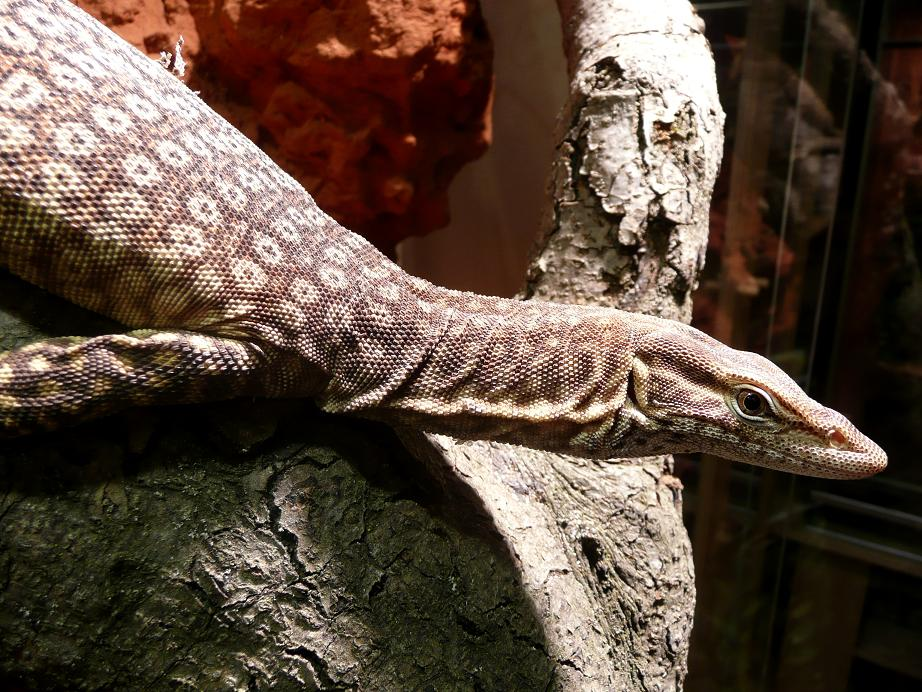
- Freckled monitor (V. t. orientalis)
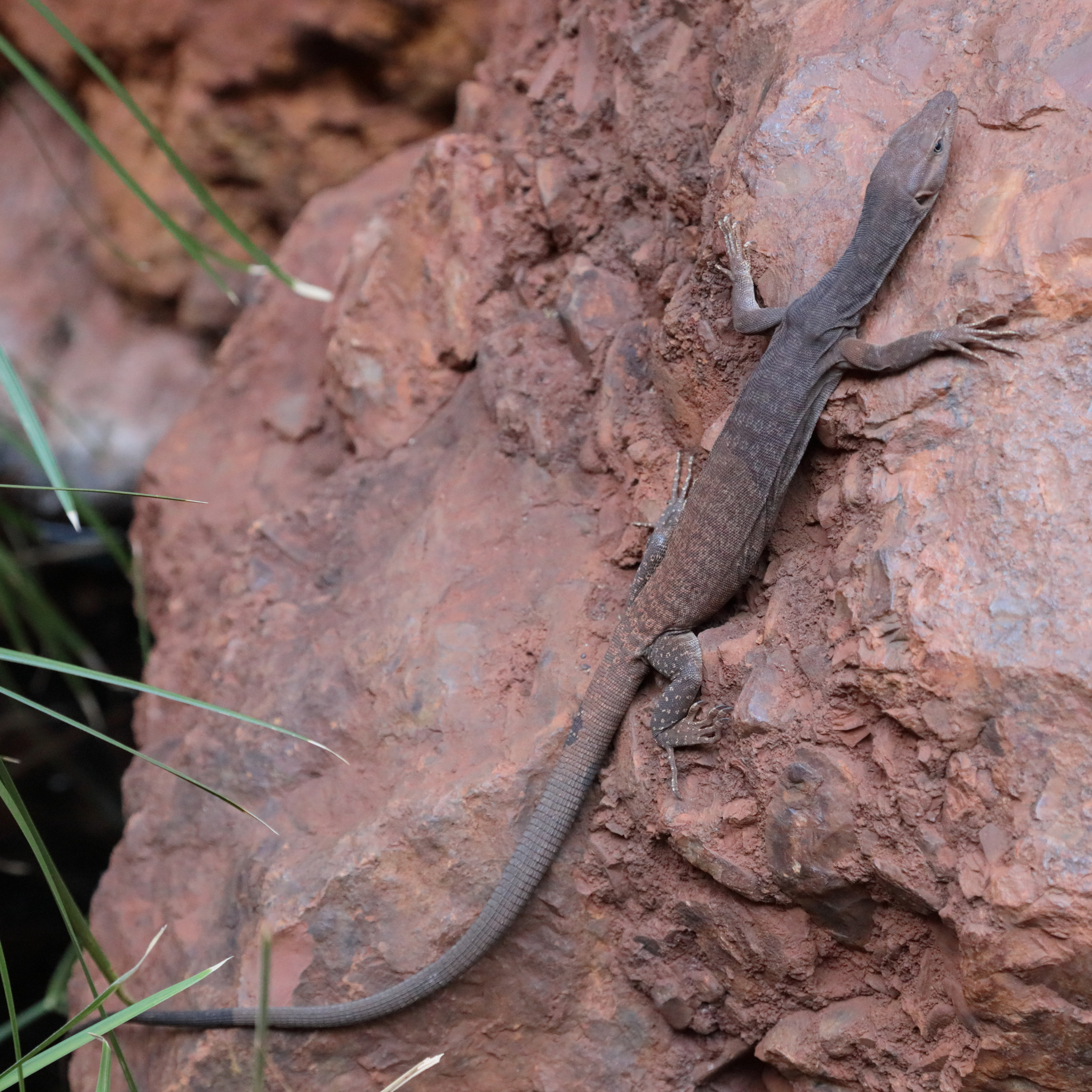
- Black-headed monitor (V. t. tristis)

Conservation status
- Least Concern (IUCN 3.1)

Scientific classification
- Kingdom: Animalia
- Phylum: Chordata
- Class: Reptilia
- Order: Squamata
- Suborder: Anguimorpha
- Family: Varanidae
- Genus: Varanus
- Subgenus: Odatria
- Species: V. tristis

Binomial name
- Varanus tristis Schlegel, 1839

Subspecies
- V. t. tristis; V. t. orientalis
- Natural range of the black-headed monitor

= Black-headed monitor =

Species of lizard

The black-headed monitor or black-tailed monitor (Varanus tristis) is a relatively small species of monitor lizards native to Australia. It is occasionally also called the mournful monitor, freckled monitor (Varanus tristis orientalis) or the racehorse monitor, a name it shares with the Gould's monitor due to their exceptional speed. It is placed in the subgenus Odatria.

== Nomenclature ==
Its specific name, tristis, means "sad", in reference to the completely black colouration of V. t. tristis populations around Perth.

== Distribution ==
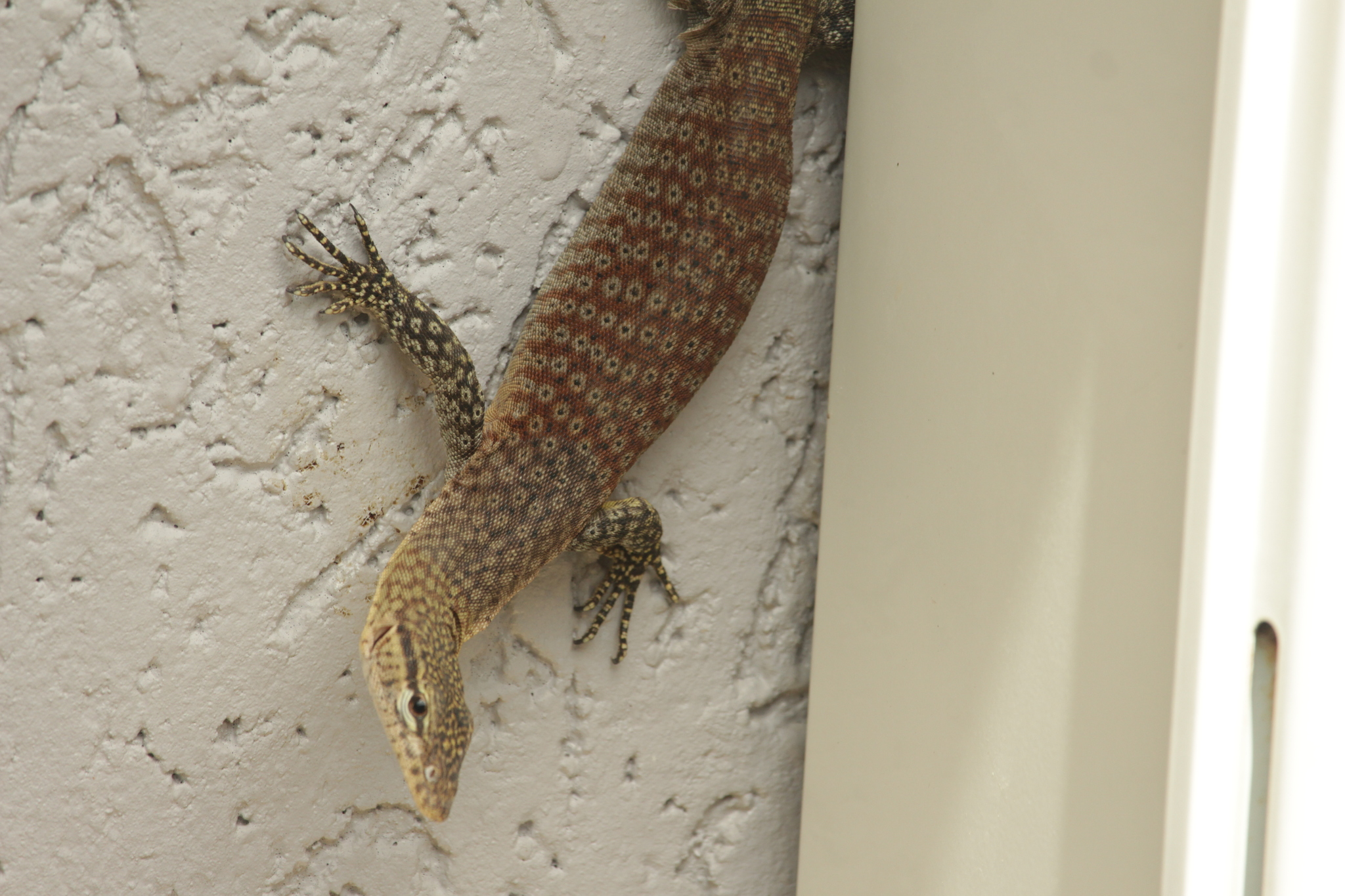
Freckled monitor (V. t. orientalis), Queensland.

This is the most widespread monitor species in Australia, occurring throughout the mainland and even on some northern islands such as Magnetic Island. It is only absent in the southernmost and south-easternmost regions of Australia. V. t. tristis is found mainly to the west of Australia, while V. t. orientalis is confined mainly to eastern Australia. The two subspecies are sympatric in some areas such as the east coast of Queensland. This arboreal monitor lizard is usually found near rivers in forests, scrublands, woodlands, but also inhabits deserts. It takes shelter in tight spaces such as loose bark, tree hollows, and rocky crevices.

== Description ==
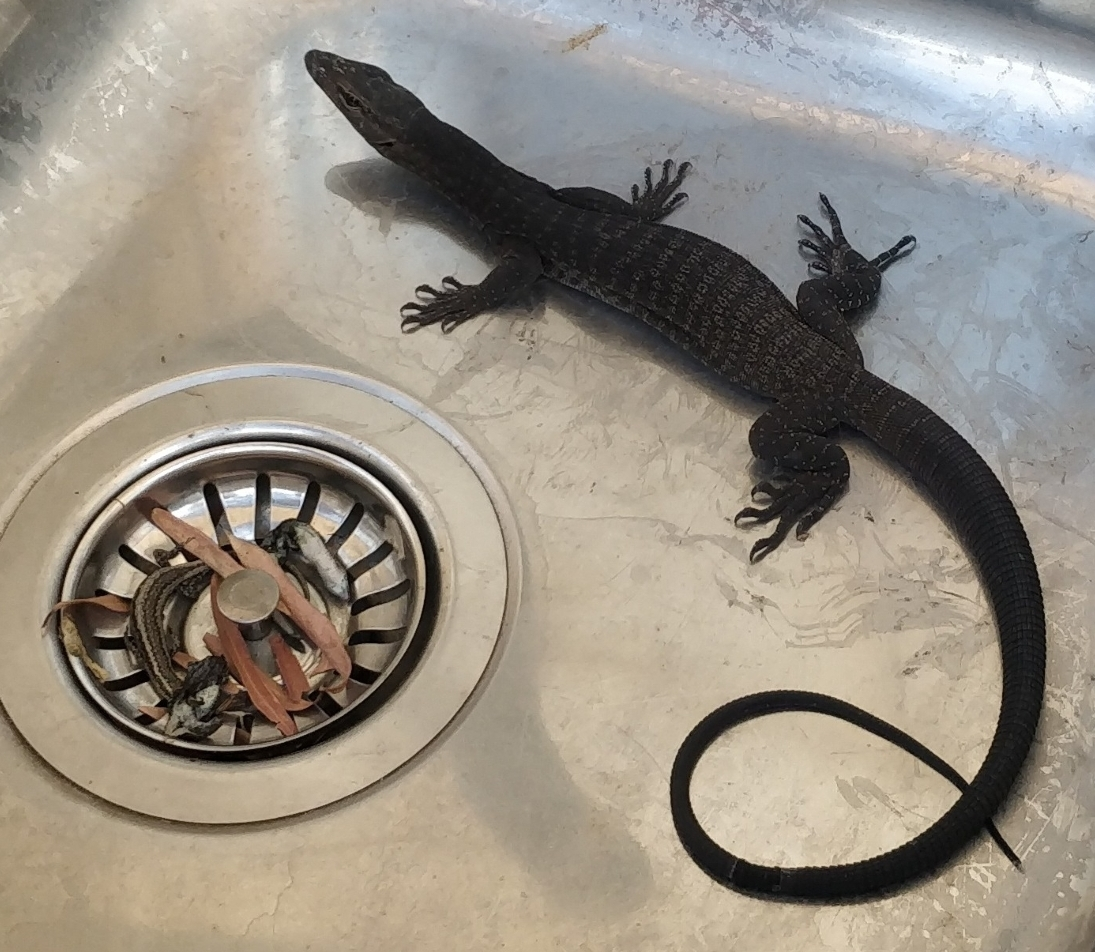
Black-headed monitor (V. t. tristis) in a sink with several dead lizards, Western Australia.

At up to 80 cm long, V. t. tristis is the larger of two distinct subspecies. Populations around Perth are completely black, but populations further north in warmer regions become increasingly lighter in colour. At up to 60cm long, the freckled monitor (V. t. orientalis) is the smaller subspecies, with a lighter, more distinct colouration, and a less spiny tail. The hatchlings of both subspecies are brightly coloured, but only freckled monitors retain much of this colouration into adulthood.

Males can be identified after sexual maturity (usually around two years of age) by a large cluster of spiny scales either size of the animal's vent. Female specimens lack these obvious protrusions and rarely possess more than a small number of spines only slightly larger than the surrounding scales. Both sexes reach sexual maturity by the time they are 20 cm long from snout to vent.

== Behaviour ==
They are most active in the spring, and may travel a kilometre every day in search of food to accumulate enough fat reserves to last them through the six to seven cold winter months when they become inactive. Although both are semi-arboreal, V. t. tristis is slightly less arboreal than V. t. orientalis. V. tristis is known to sometimes curl its tail over its head and body when walking or basking, but the reason for this behaviour is unknown.

=== Diet ===
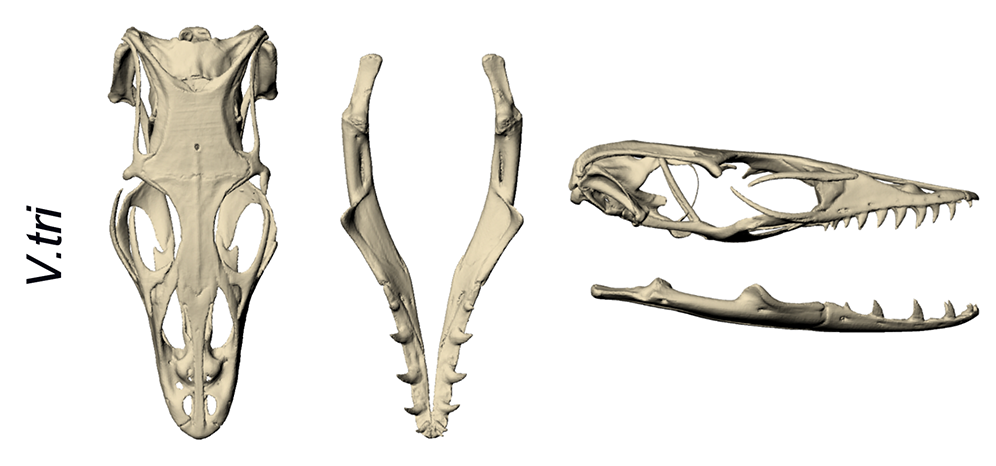
Skull

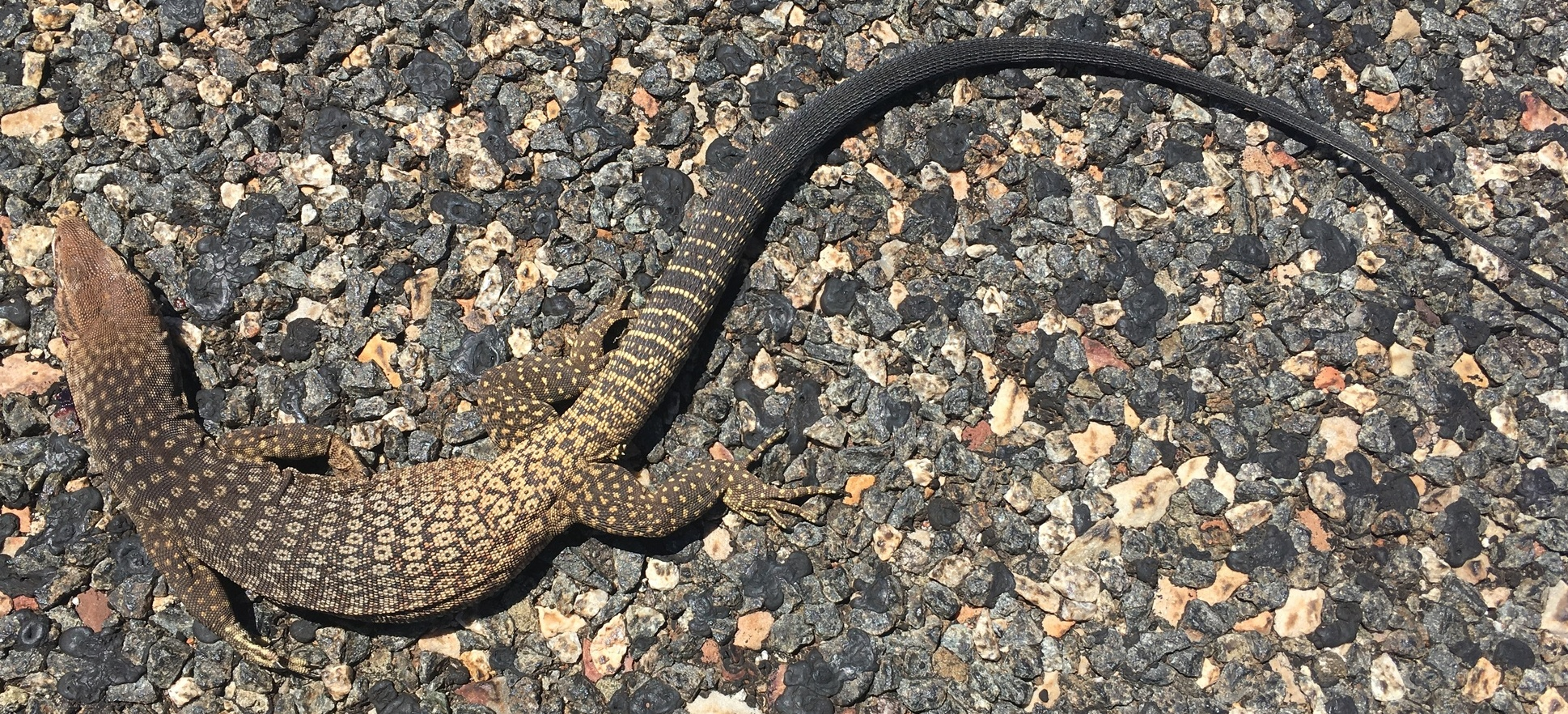
V. tristis, Northern Territory

V. tristis eats small mammals, frogs, other lizards such as agamids, geckos, skinks, and smaller monitor species. They are even capable of eating thorny devils. They also invade bird nests to eat eggs and chicks, and eat a variety of insects such as orthopterans, beetles, ants, and stick insects. There is conflicting reports of whether their diet primarily consists of other lizards, mammals, frogs, or insects; it seems that a population's diet varies based on geographical location.

=== Reproduction ===
The breeding season is in November, at which point pairs start sharing the same tree. Females lay a clutch of 6-11, but up to as many as 17 eggs in December, which hatch in February or March after incubating at a temperature of 27-29°C.
