= Now We're Cookin' (album) =

Studio album by Polish Club
- Released: 13 August 2021
- Length: 34:26
- Label: Double Double; Island
- Producer: Polish Club, Scott Horscroft

Polish Club chronology
Live & Horny at the Corner (2020)	Now We're Cookin' (2021)	Now We're Cookin' in Hell (2022)

Singles from Now We're Cookin'
- 1. "Just Talking" Released: 6 November 2020; 2. "Stop for a Minute" Released: 19 February 2021; 3. "No Heaven" Released: 21 May 2021; 4. "Whack" Released: 24 June 2021; 5. "Baby We’re Burning" Released: 13 August 2021

Now We're Cookin' is the third studio album by Australian garage duo, Polish Club. It was announced on 21 May 2021, alongside the third single, "No Heaven" and released on 13 August 2021. The album peaked at number 8 on the ARIA Chart, becoming their highest chart position and first top ten release for the duo. The album was supported with the Now We're Tourin' tour, which commenced in Adelaide on 3 September 2021.

David Novak said the writing process occurred during 2020's COVID-19 lockdown and the duo wrote "about 90 songs". John-Henry Pajak continued "We were just writing straight hits. Dave would bring something in and I'd be like 'It needs more hooks'. We were ruthless."

In an interview with Triple J, the duo further explained, "[with] our first batch of demos, we wanted to make a classic Aussie rock album, an AC/DC, Midnight Oil kind of thing" but the songs presented were not received well by their team. Novak said "We stopped being so grand about genre and concept, and started thinking about our strengths and how they can get us to the catchiest hooks, the best melodies, the most basic, immediate things that make a song click as many people as possible."

== Reception ==
Professional ratings
Review scores
Source	Rating
The AU Review	4/5 stars
Backseat Mafia	8.2/10
Rolling Stone Australia	4/5 stars

Upon release, it was the feature album on triple J with the station promoting it by saying, "With their signature guitars, pop hooks, powerful vocals and R&B influence, it's a juicy slice to sink your teeth into."

Dylan Marshall from The AU Review said: "Now We're Cookin' is Polish Club at their best, most melodic and entirely complete" adding "there's a sense of lightness to the album that opens up the band's more endearing and earnest side."

Rolling Stone Australia said: "Polish Club have spent their time breaking new ground and subverting expectations with their blistering sound. Now We're Cookin' continues that thread, with their soulful, blues-rock sounding mixing with almost Nineties-like pop sensibilities at times, showcasing a truly understated versatility."

Alasdair Belling from Tone Deaf said "When it comes to their sound, Polish Club have always been outliers, strutting soul-injected rock and roll alongside the likes of Royal Blood, DZ Deathrays and countless other guitar-slinging bands. Now We're Cookin' is no exception to their (lack thereof) rules, combining their trademark guitar and drum energy, overlaid with 80s synths and infectious hooks." Belling said "It's Queens of the Stone Age going to a disco with Cher with Billy Bragg on the decks [and] it works like a charm."

Sally McMullen from Music Feeds said Now We're Cookin' takes us on stylistic twists and turns. It bursts out of the gate with the groovin' 'Stop for a Minute', which uses an earworm chorus to comment on toxic behaviour in the music industry. Then we're served toe-tapping percussion, playful guitar riffs and Novak's fierce falsetto on 'New Age'. Polish Club purists need fear not, the boys make many nods to their garage rock roots on tracks like the fuzzy 'Whack', pop-rock infused 'Just Talking' and the croony tongue-in-cheek closer 'Fuck Off & Die'.

Arun Kendall from Backseat Mafia called the album "a very pleasant ray of sunshine when all else around is dark. And yet this bright ray of colour is a little more nuanced and layered than is expected. This is a band with a presence and diverse sonic textures."

Al Newstead from Triple J said "Simple lyrics, catchy melodies, accessible sounds - every track is designed to be easy to pick up and hard to put down, and never outlasts its welcome, saying what it needs to in a radio-friendly three-and-a-bit minutes and done."

Steven G from The Weekend Notes said "This is a great album. One track took me a bit of getting used to, 9 tracks are just listenable from the word go, and you can't ask for much more than that."

== Track listing ==
All songs written and performed by Polish Club.

1. "Stop for a Minute" – 3:52
2. "New Age" – 3:12
3. "Getaway" – 3:50
4. "Fix Your Heart" – 3:53
5. "No Heaven" – 3:28
6. "Whack" – 3:22
7. "Just Talking" – 3:01
8. "I Didn't Want That (For You)" – 3:20
9. "Baby We're Burning" – 3:38
10. "Fuck Off & Die" – 2:41

== Charts ==
Chart performance for Now We're Cookin'
Chart (2021)	Peak position
Australian Albums (ARIA)	8

== Release history ==
Release history and formats for Now We're Cookin'
Region	Date	Format	Label	Catalogue
Various	13 August 2021	Digital	Double Double; Island	—
Australia	13 August 2021	LP (limited); CD	Double Double; Island	3592649 - 3592650
