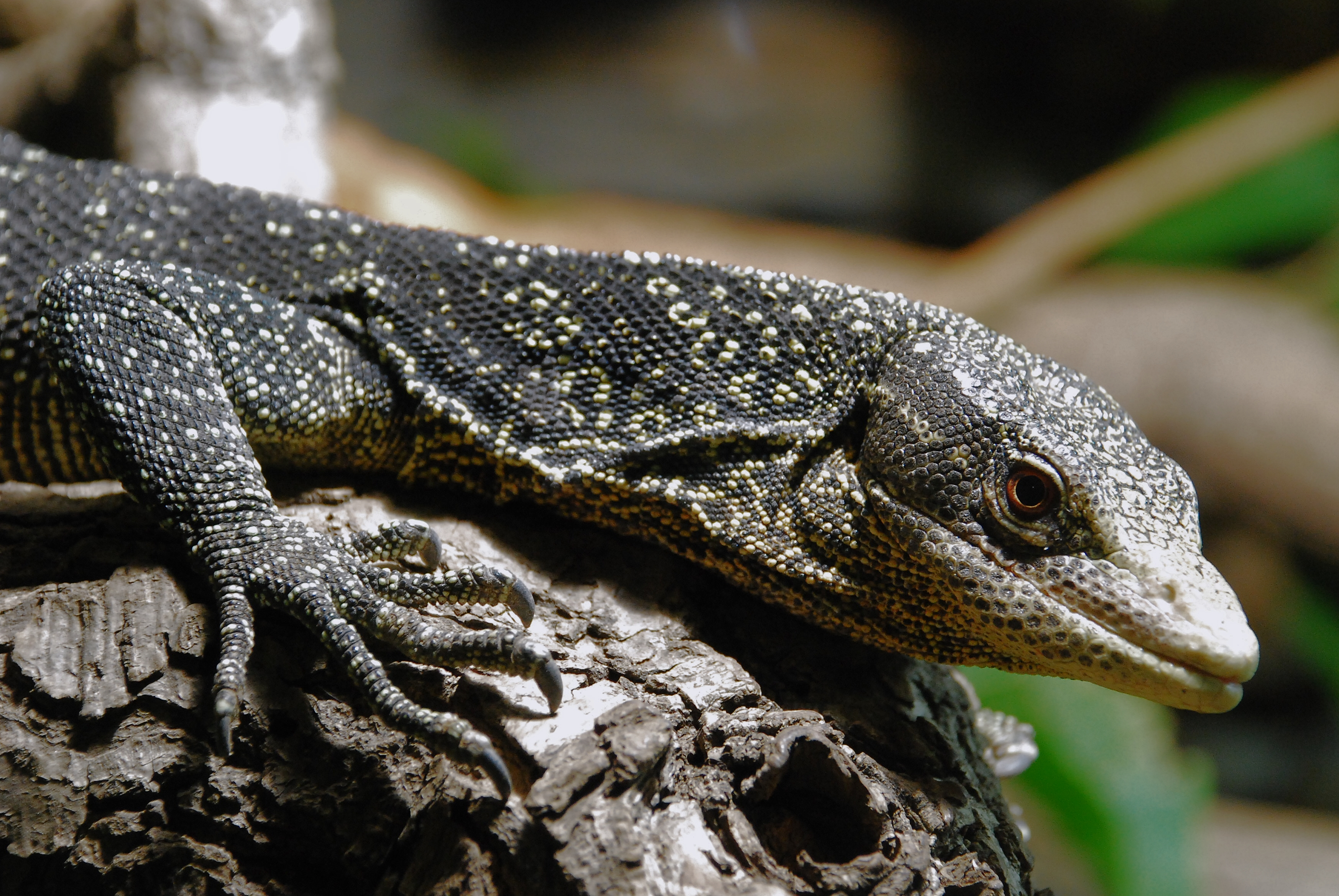

Conservation status
- Data Deficient (IUCN 3.1)

Scientific classification
- Kingdom: Animalia
- Phylum: Chordata
- Class: Reptilia
- Order: Squamata
- Suborder: Anguimorpha
- Family: Varanidae
- Genus: Varanus
- Subgenus: Hapturosaurus
- Species: V. boehmei

Binomial name
- Varanus boehmei Jacobs, 2003

Synonyms
- Varanus boehmei Jacobs, 2003; Varanus (Euprepiosaurus) boehmei — Ziegler et al., 2007; Varanus (Hapturosaurus) boehmei — Bucklitsch et al., 2016

= Golden-spotted tree monitor =

Species of lizard

The golden-spotted tree monitor (Varanus boehmei), also known commonly as the golden speckled tree monitor, is a species of monitor lizard in the family Varanidae. The species is endemic to Waigeo Island in Indonesia.

== Etymology ==
The specific name, boehmei, is in honor of German herpetologist Wolfgang Böhme.

== Geographic range and habitat ==
V. boehmei is native to the forests of Waigeo, Indonesia.

== Behavior ==
The golden-spotted tree monitor has a prehensile tail, and it spends most of its life in trees.

== Description ==
V. boehmei grows to around 1 m (3.3 ft) in total length (including tail).

== Reproduction ==
V. boehmei is oviparous.
