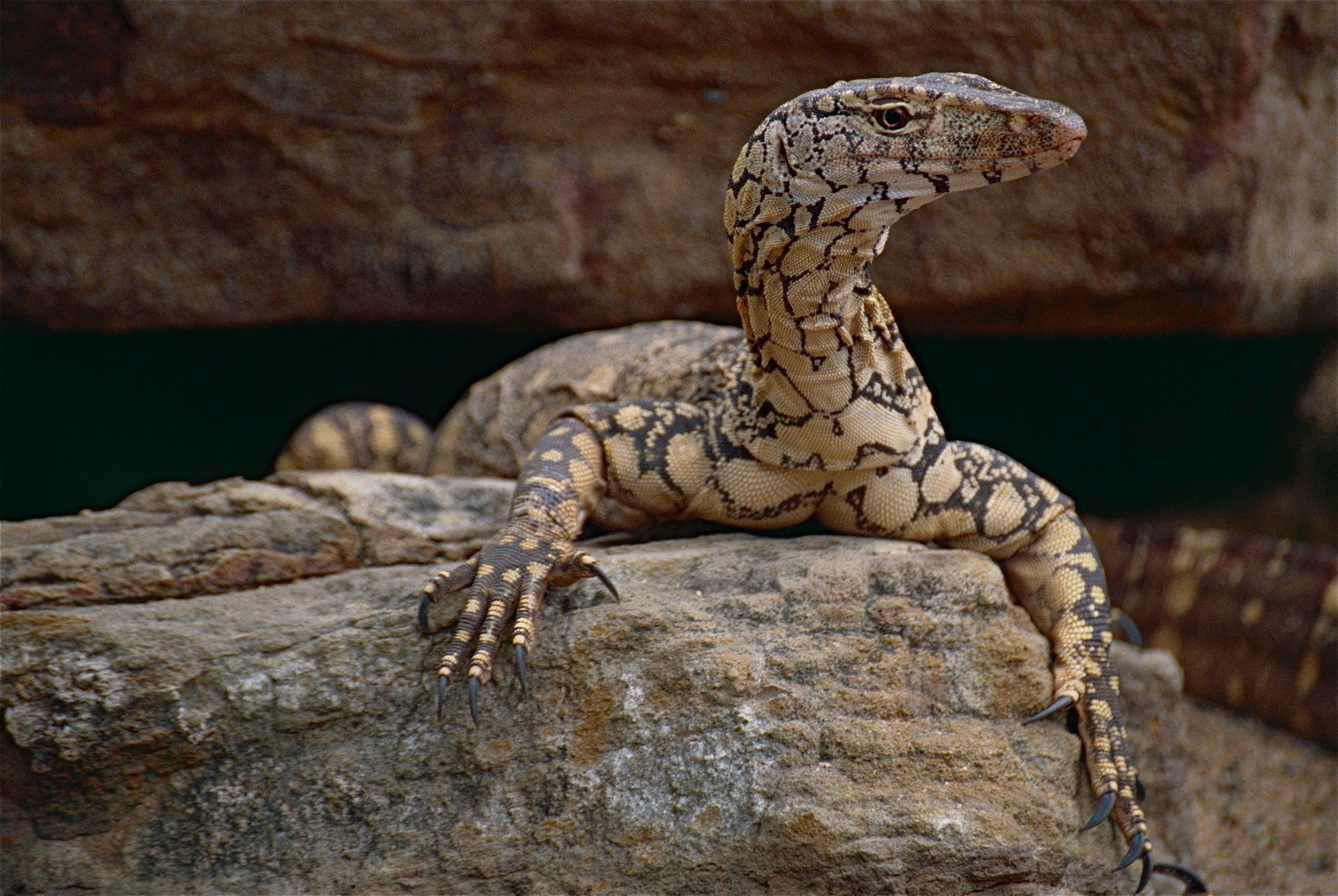

Conservation status
- Least Concern (IUCN 3.1)
- CITES Appendix II

Scientific classification
- Kingdom: Animalia
- Phylum: Chordata
- Class: Reptilia
- Order: Squamata
- Suborder: Anguimorpha
- Family: Varanidae
- Genus: Varanus
- Subgenus: Varanus
- Species: V. giganteus

Binomial name
- Varanus giganteus (Gray, 1845)
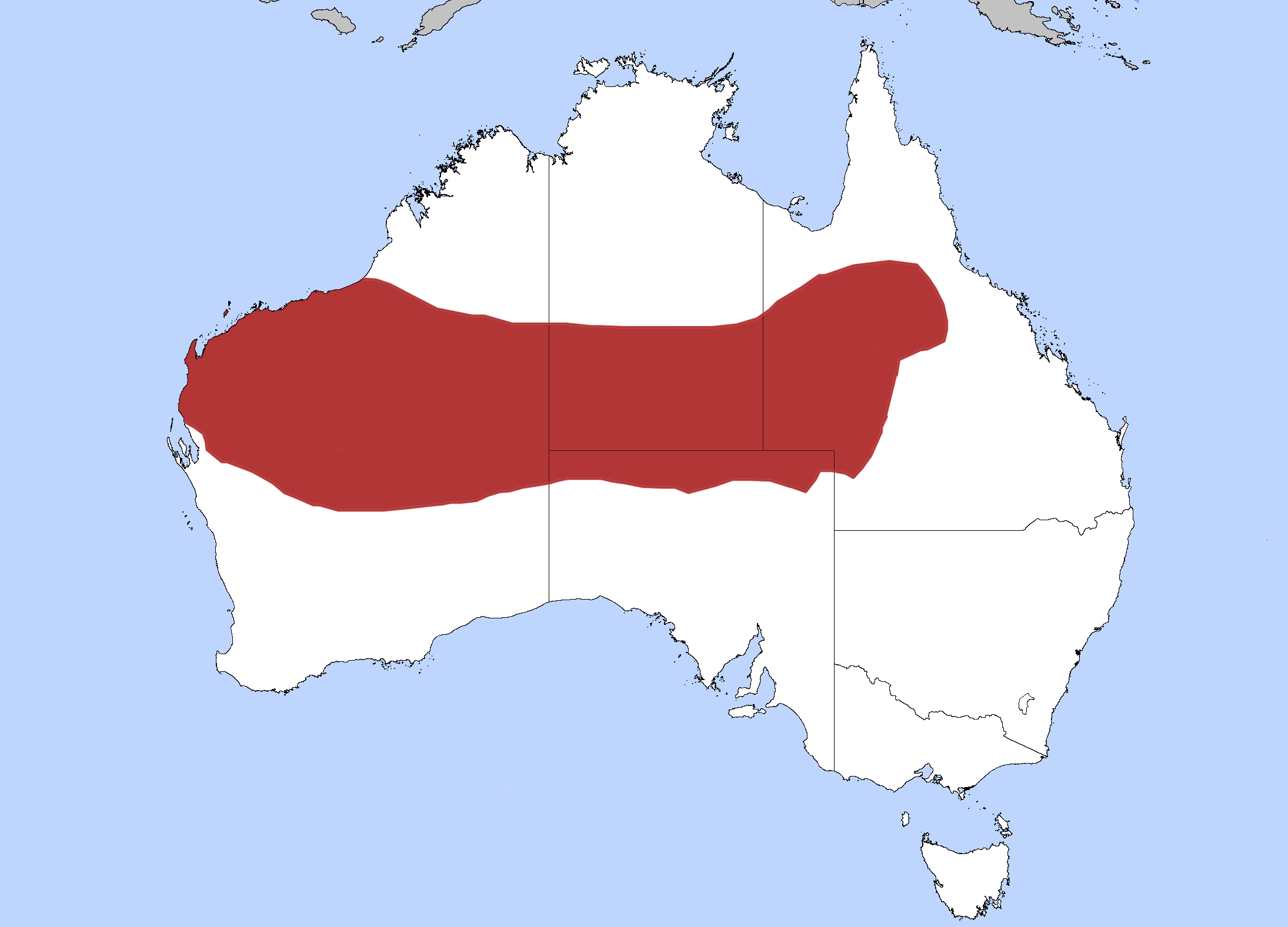
- Distribution of the perentie

Synonyms
- Hydrosaurus giganteus, Gray

= Perentie =

Species of lizard

The perentie (Varanus giganteus) is a species of monitor lizard. It is one of the largest living lizards, after the Komodo dragon, Asian water monitor, and the crocodile monitor. Found west of the Great Dividing Range in the arid areas of Australia, it is rarely seen because of its shyness and the remoteness of much of its range from human habitation. The species is considered to be a least-concern species according to the International Union for Conservation of Nature.

Its status in many Aboriginal cultures is evident in the totemic relationships, and part of the Ngiṉṯaka dreaming, as well as bush tucker. It was a favoured food item among desert Aboriginal tribes, and the fat was used for medicinal and ceremonial purposes.

== Taxonomy ==
British zoologist John Edward Gray described the perentie in 1845 as Hydrosaurus giganteus, calling it the "gigantic water lizard". George Albert Boulenger moved it to the genus Varanus.

Within the monitor genus Varanus, it belongs to the subgenus Varanus.

== Distribution and habitat ==
Perenties are found in the arid desert areas of Western Australia, South Australia, the Northern Territory, and Queensland. Their habitats consist of rocky outcroppings and gorges, with hard-packed soil and loose stones.

== Description ==
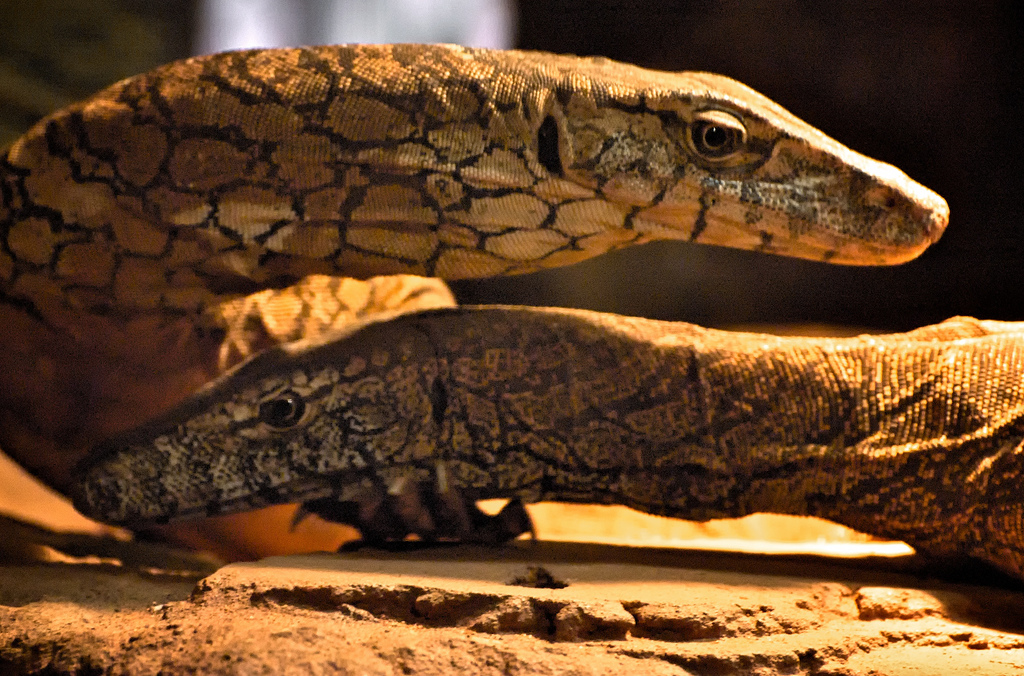
Juvenile pair in Perth Zoo

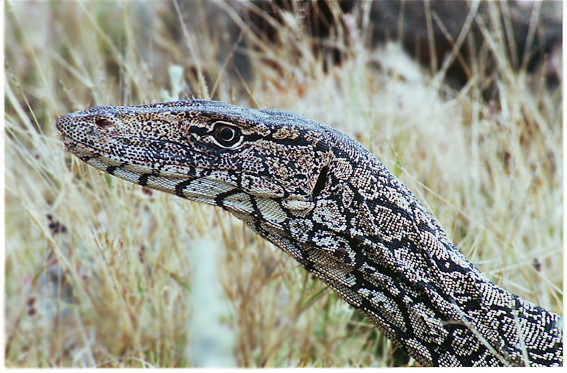
Wild adult, Carnarvon, Western Australia

Perenties are the largest living species of lizard in Australia. They can grow to lengths of 2.5 m (8 ft 2 in) and weigh up to 20 kg (44 lb), possibly up to 3 m (9 ft 10 in) and 40 kg (88 lb), making it the fourth-largest extant species of lizard (exceeded in size only by the Komodo dragon, Asian water monitor, and crocodile monitor). Perenties are very lean among large monitors, though, making them significantly less bulky than rock monitors at a similar length.

The head and neck of the perentie have a creamy-white background and a reticulated pattern of black lines and flecks. The body is a yellow or cream colour, with brown rosettes on the back. The limbs are dark with white spots.

=== Venom ===
In late 2005, University of Melbourne researchers discovered that all monitors may be somewhat venomous. Previously, bites inflicted by monitors were thought to be prone to infection because of bacteria in their mouths, but the researchers showed that the immediate effects are caused by mild envenomation. Bites on the hand by Komodo dragons (V. komodensis), perenties (V. giganteus), lace monitors (V. varius), and spotted tree monitors (V. scalaris) have been observed to cause swelling within minutes, localised disruption of blood clotting, and shooting pain up to the elbow, which can often last for several hours.

University of Washington biologist Kenneth V. Kardong and toxicologists Scott A. Weinstein and Tamara L. Smith have argued that the suggestion of venom glands "... has had the effect of underestimating the variety of complex roles played by oral secretions in the biology of reptiles, produced a very narrow view of oral secretions and resulted in misinterpretation of reptilian evolution". According to the scientists "... reptilian oral secretions contribute to many biological roles other than to quickly dispatch prey". They concluded, "Calling all in this clade venomous implies an overall potential danger that does not exist, misleads in the assessment of medical risks, and confuses the biological assessment of squamate biochemical systems".

== Behaviour and ecology ==
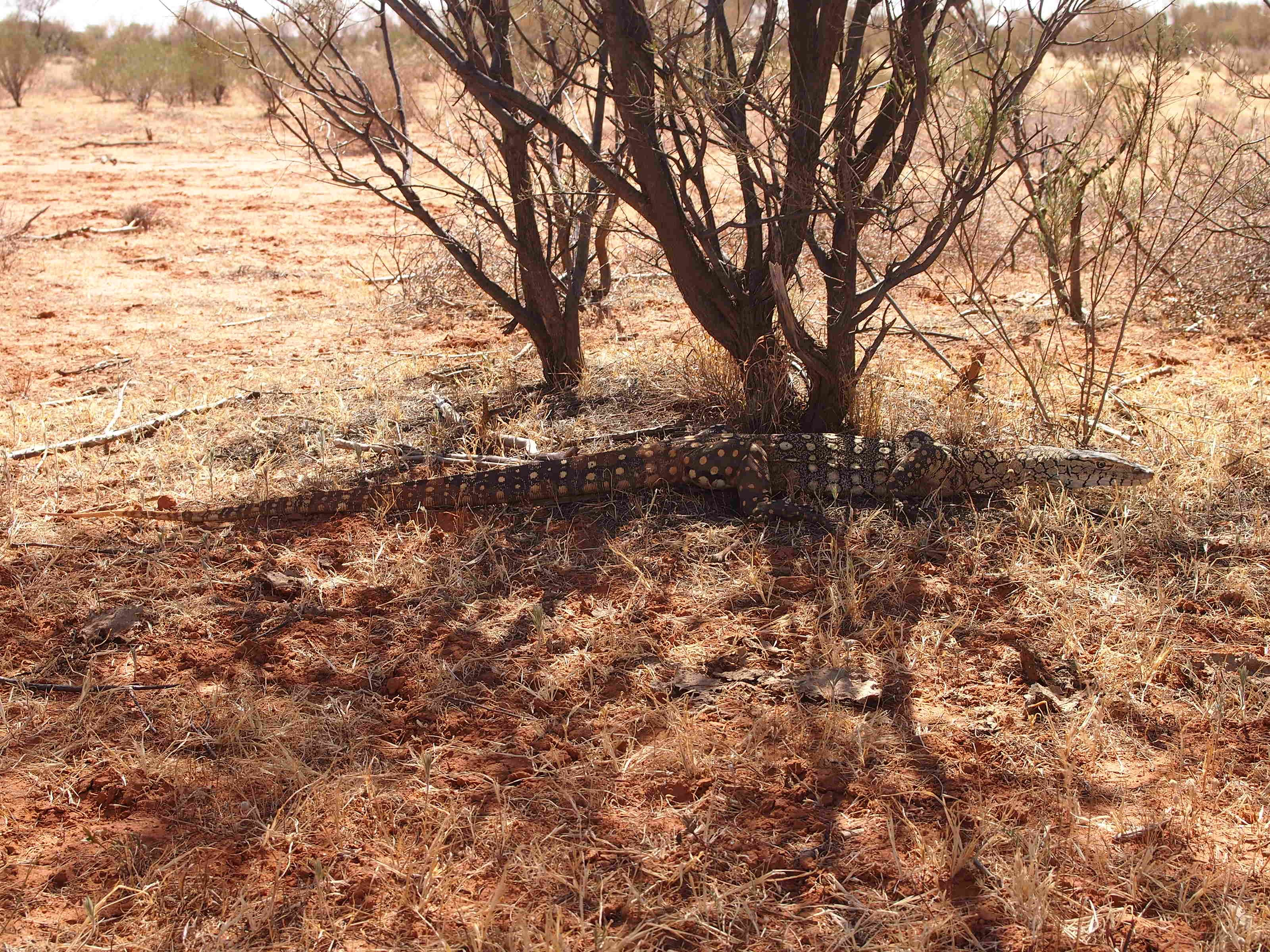
The striking colour pattern of perenties camouflages them in their environment.

Perenties typically avoid human contact and often retreat before they are seen. Being able diggers, they can excavate a burrow for shelter in only minutes. Their long claws enable them to climb trees easily. They often stand on their back legs and tails to gain a better view of the surrounding terrain. This behavior, known as "tripoding", is quite common in monitor species. Perenties are fast sprinters and can run using either all four legs or just their hind legs.

Typical of most goannas, the perentie either freezes (lying flat on the ground, and remaining very still until the danger has passed) or runs if detected. If cornered, the powerful carnivore stands its ground and relies on its claws, teeth, and whip-like tail to defend itself. It can inflate its throat and hiss as a defensive or aggressive display and can strike at opponents with its muscular tail. It may also lunge forward with an open mouth, either as a bluff or attack. The bite of a perentie can do much damage, not only from the teeth, but also because of the oral secretions.

=== Feeding ===
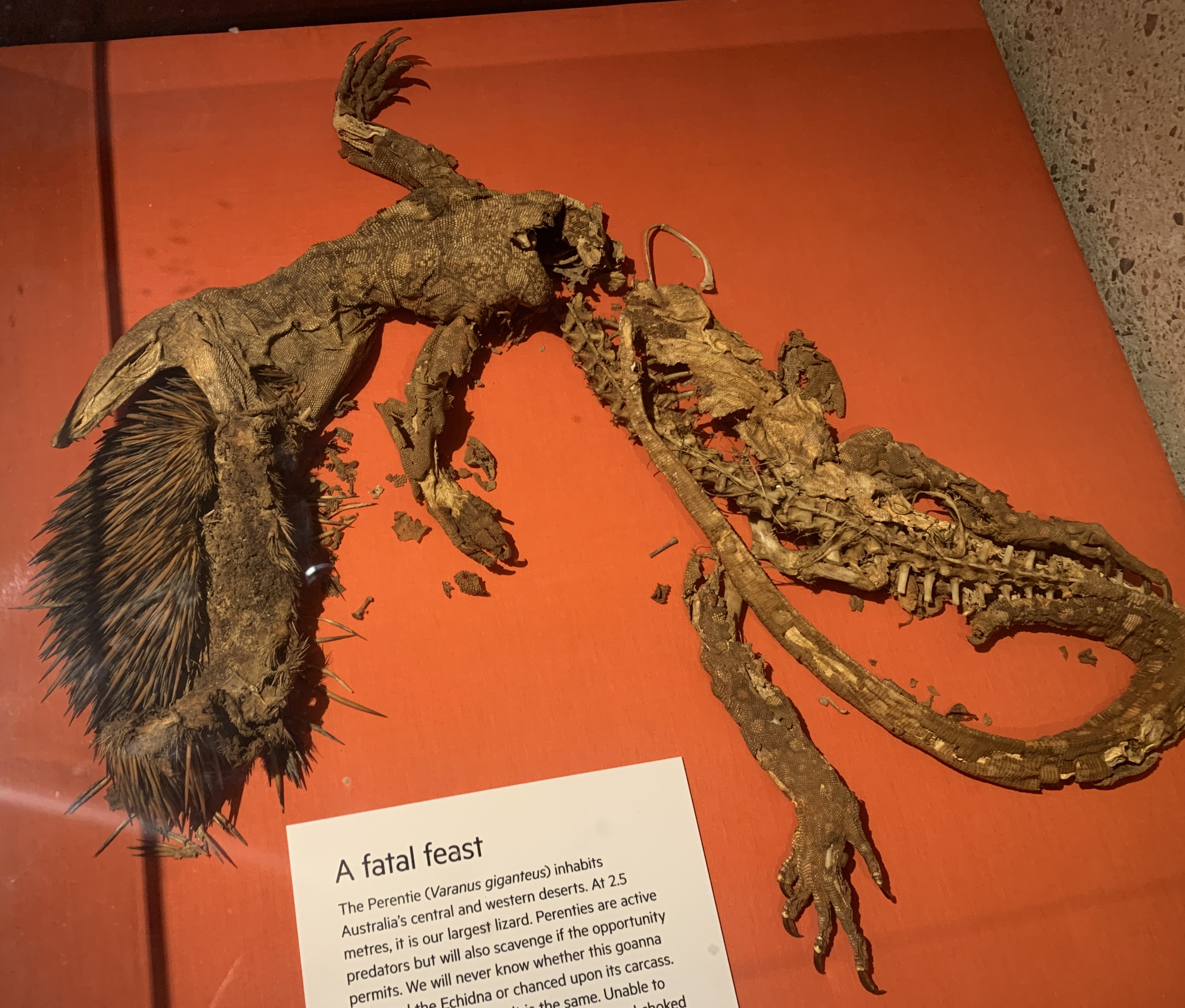
Mummified perentie that died trying to eat an echidna

The perenties are apex predators that at adult size have no natural predators in their range. They are highly active carnivores that feed on mostly reptiles, small mammals, and less commonly birds such as diamond doves. They hunt live prey, but also scavenge carrion. Reptilian prey includes mostly lizards (such as skinks and agamids) and more seldom snakes, but this species also displays a notable example of intraguild predation, as it eats an unusually large number of other monitor lizard species such as ridge-tailed monitors, black-headed monitors, Gould's monitors, and even Argus monitors. Perenties also eat smaller members of their own species; such is the case of a 2 m (6 ft 7 in) perentie killing and eating a 1.5 m (4 ft 11 in) perentie. Other lizard prey include central bearded dragons and long-nosed water dragons. Coastal and island individuals often eat a large number of sea turtle eggs and hatchlings and hide under vehicles to ambush scavenging gulls. Mammalian prey includes bats, young kangaroos, other small marsupials, and rodents. They have also been seen occasionally foraging for food in shallow water. They are able to kill kangaroos and dismember those too large to be swallowed whole using their powerful forelimbs and claws. Although adults feed predominantly on vertebrate prey, young perenties eat mostly arthropods, especially grasshoppers and centipedes.

Prey is typically swallowed whole, but if the food item is too large, chunks are ripped off for ease of consumption.

=== Breeding ===
The perentie can lay its eggs in termite mounds or the soil.

== Gallery ==
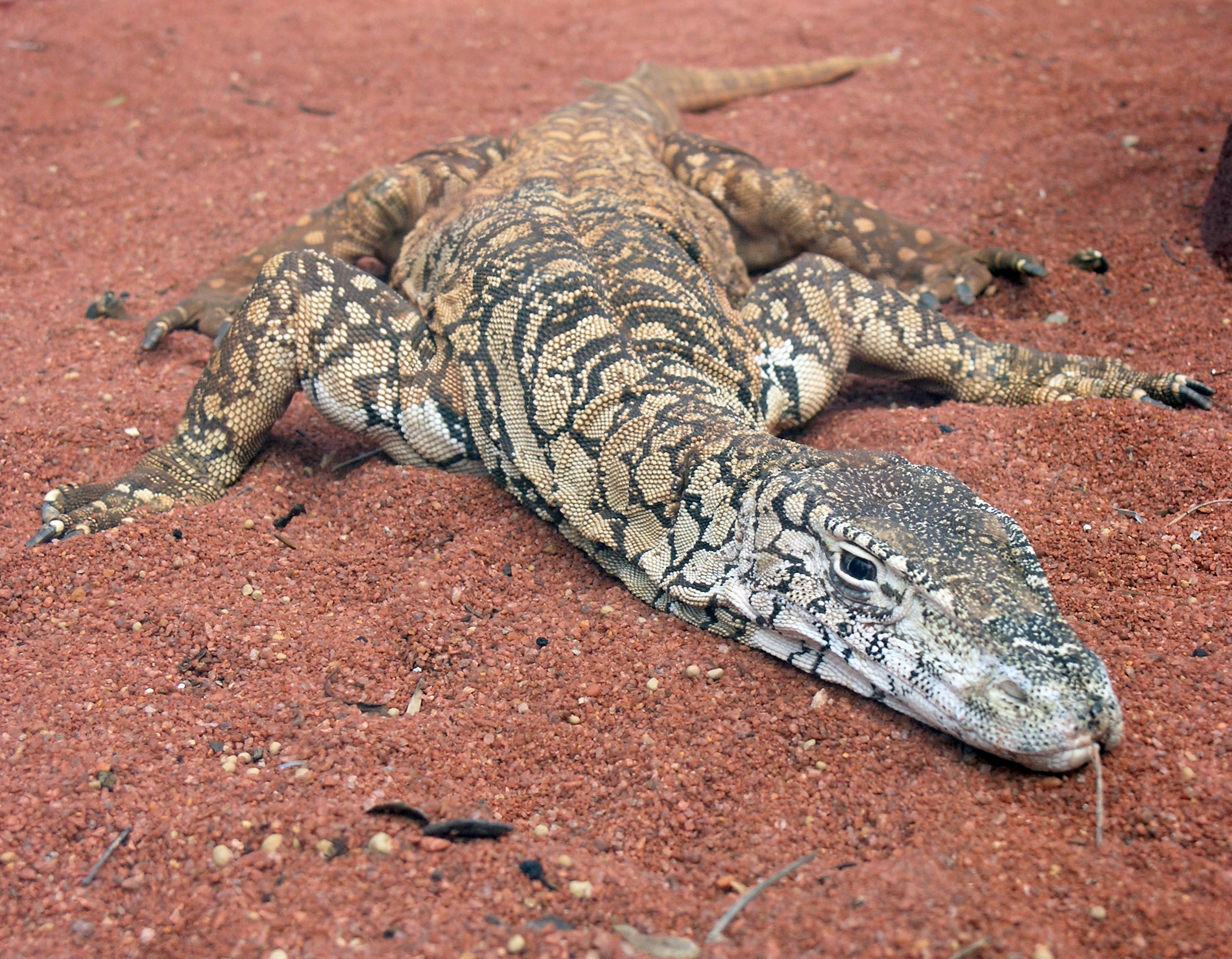
A perentie in the Perth Zoo, Western Australia

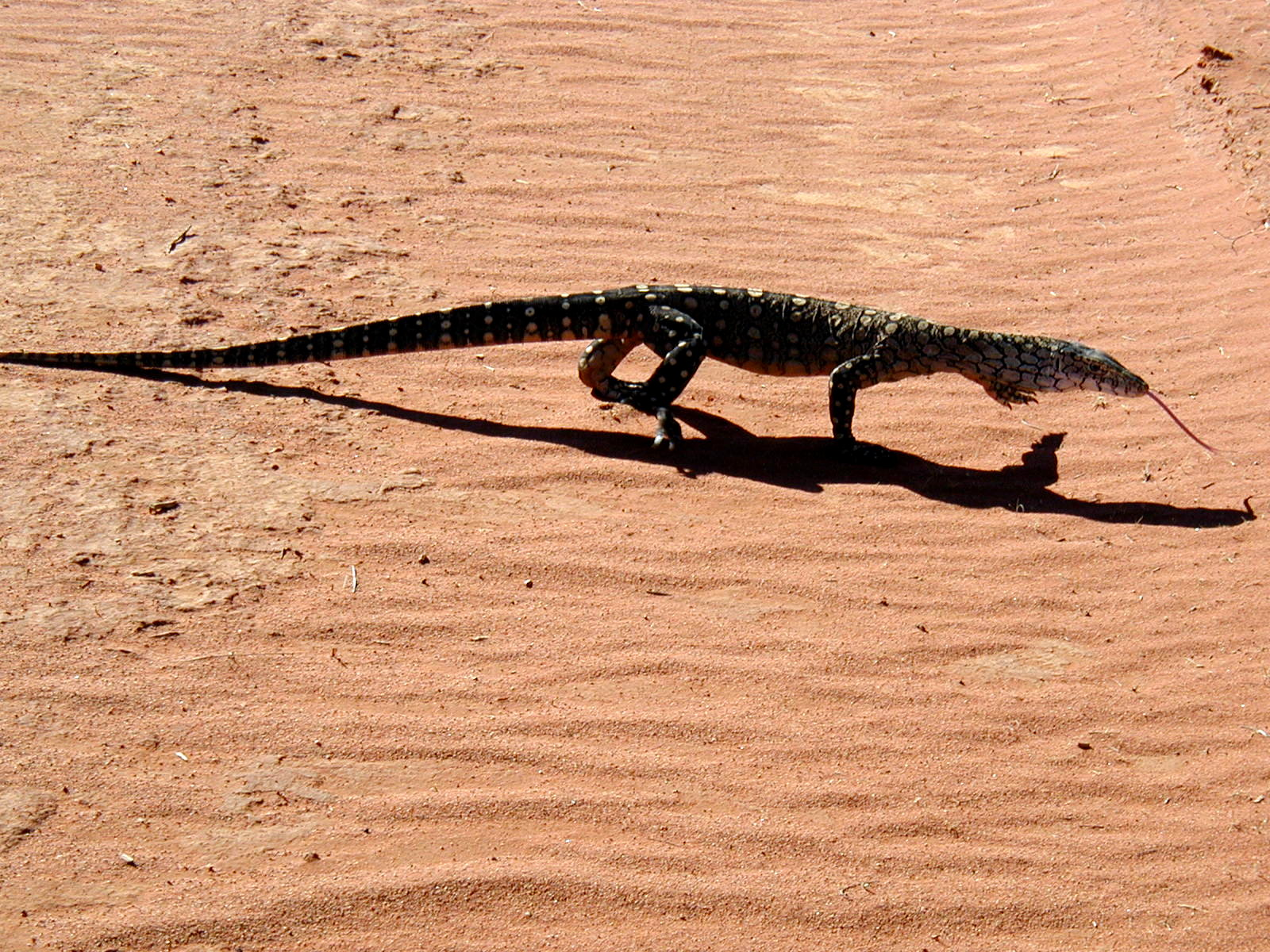
In Australia's Red Centre

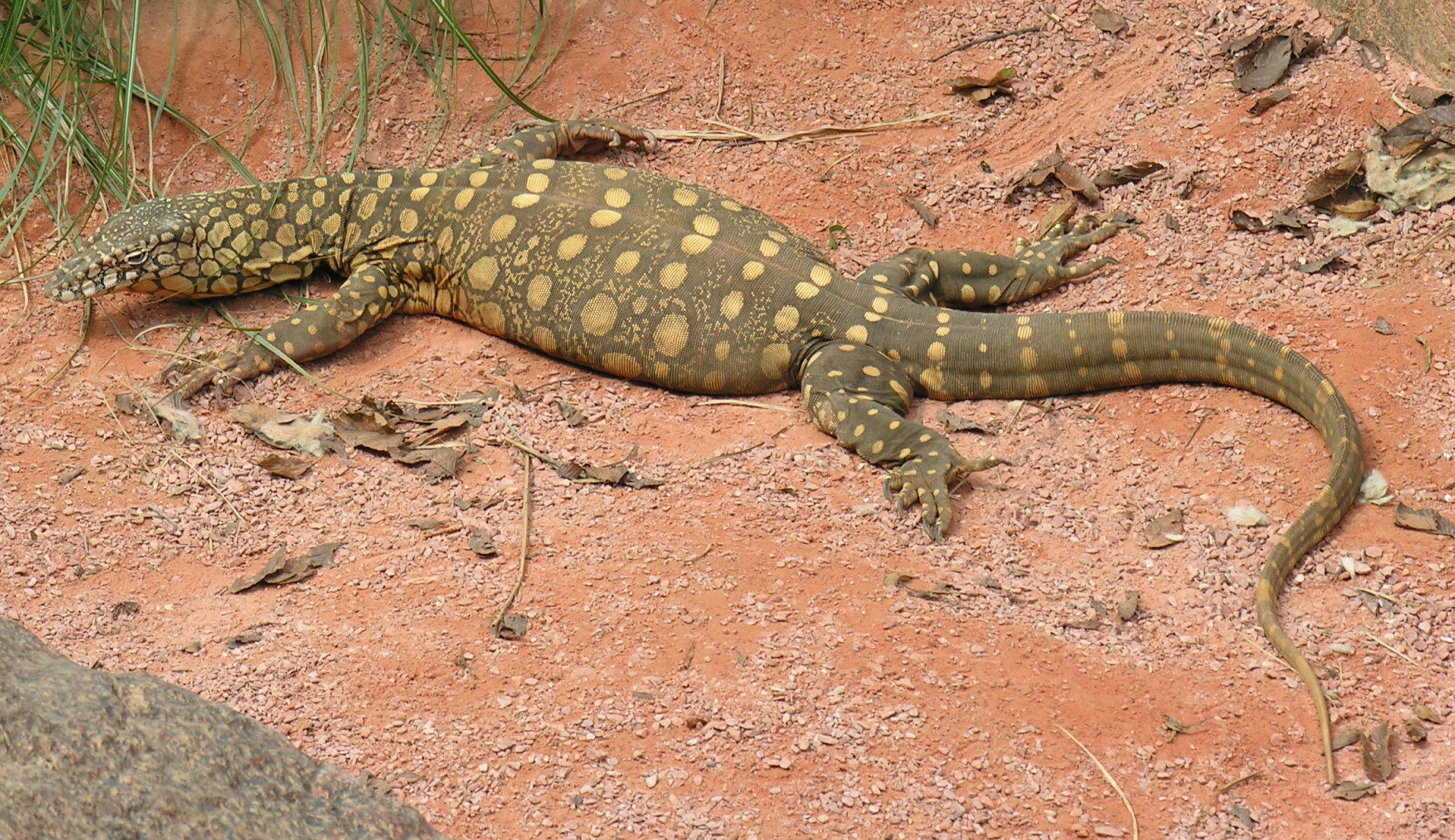
In the Dallas Zoo
