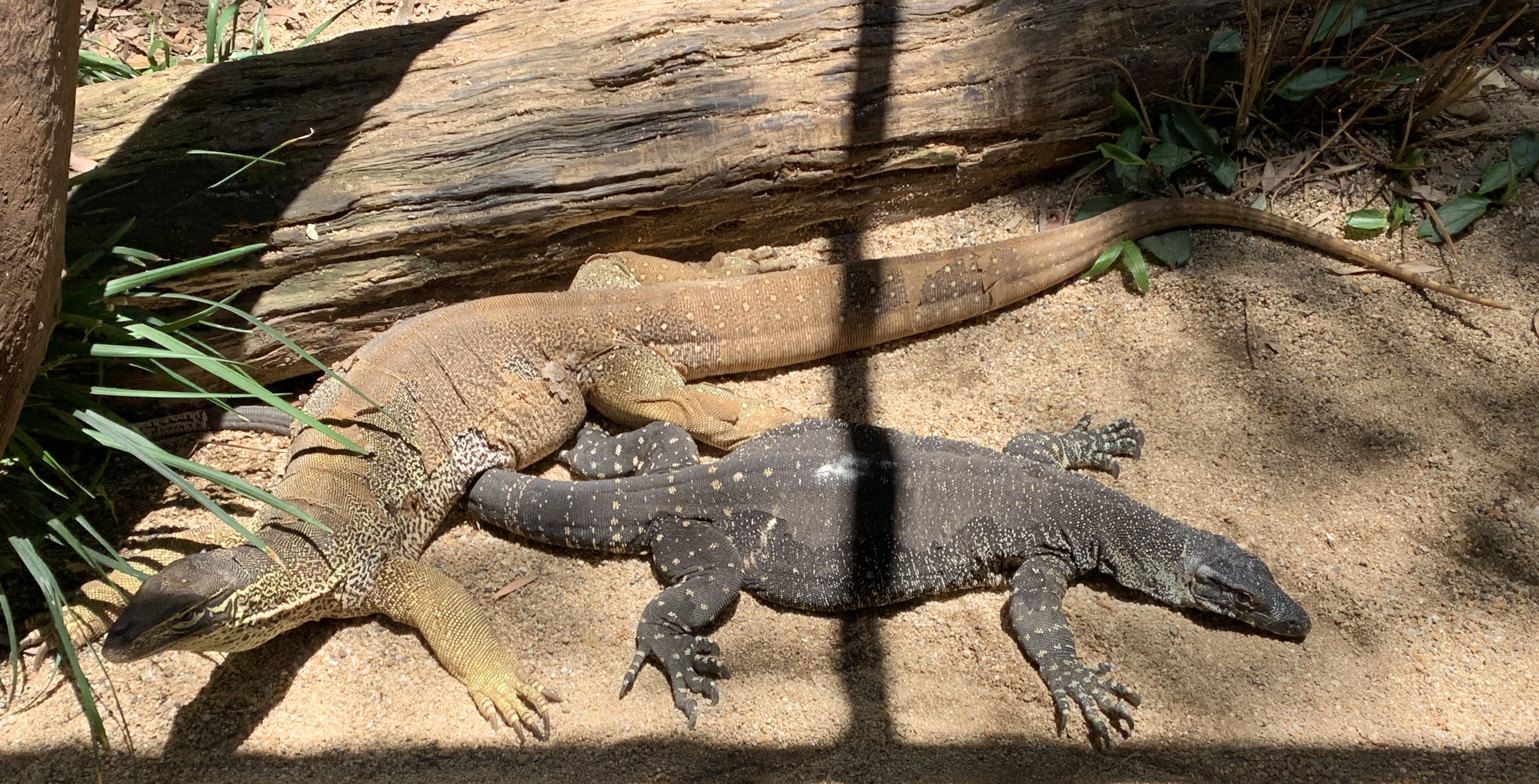
- Argus monitor (left) with lace monitor (right)

Scientific classification
- Kingdom: Animalia
- Phylum: Chordata
- Class: Reptilia
- Order: Squamata
- Suborder: Anguimorpha
- Family: Varanidae
- Genus: Varanus
- Subgenus: Varanus; Ouwens, 1912

Species
- Varanus giganteus; Varanus gouldii; Varanus komodoensis; Varanus mertensi; Varanus panoptes; †Varanus priscus; Varanus rosenbergi; Varanus spenceri; Varanus varius; †Varanus sivalensis
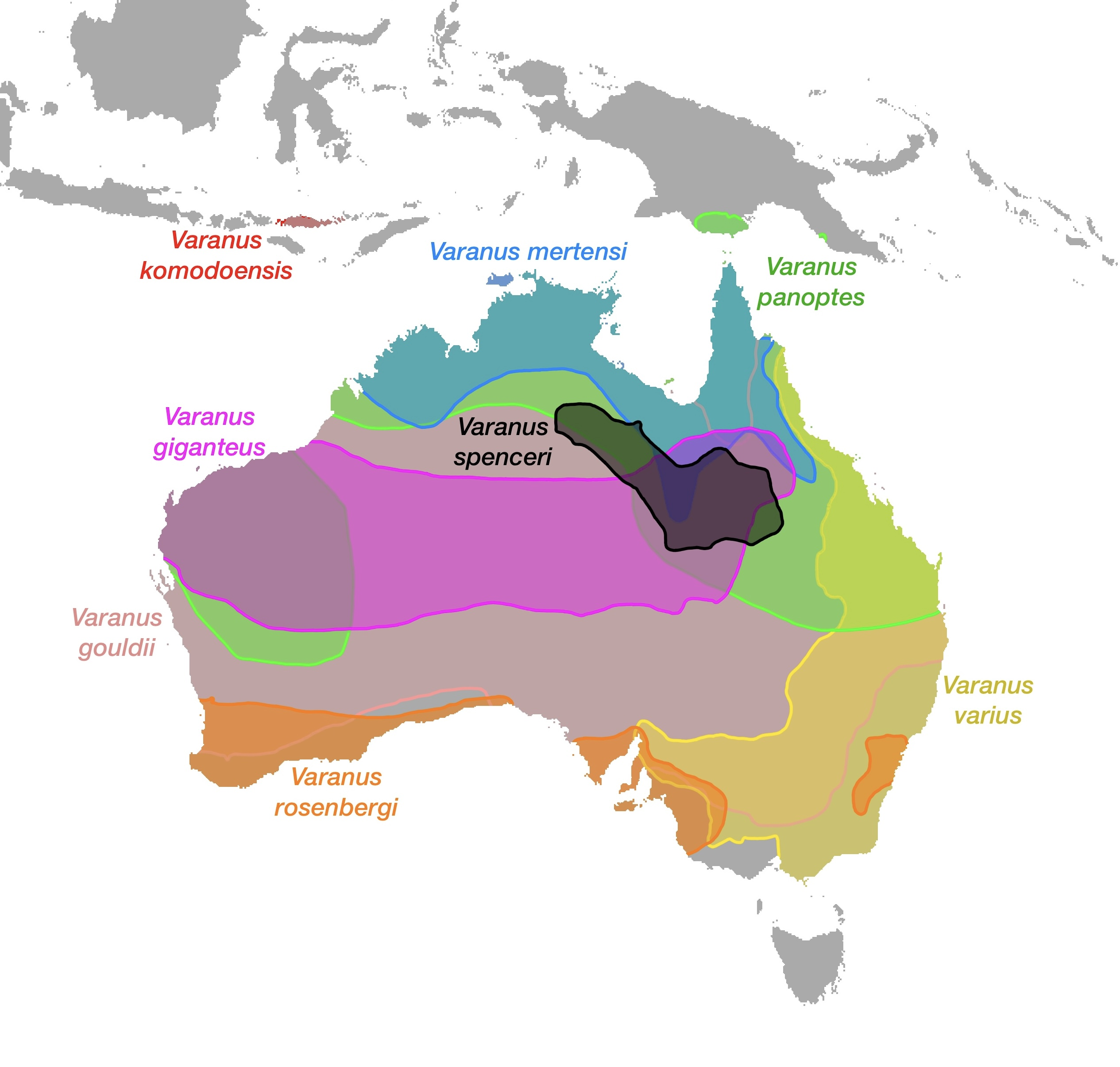

= Varanus (Varanus) =

Varanus (Varanus) Temporal range: 3.8–0 Ma

Subgenus of reptiles

Varanus, commonly known as true monitors, is one of the 11 subgenera of the genus Varanus. All of its species are found in the Australasian realm, among which are the world's largest lizards.

Within this subgenus, the monophyletic clade comprised V. panoptes, V. gouldii, V. rosenbergi, and V. spenceri are collectively known as sand monitors.

== Description ==
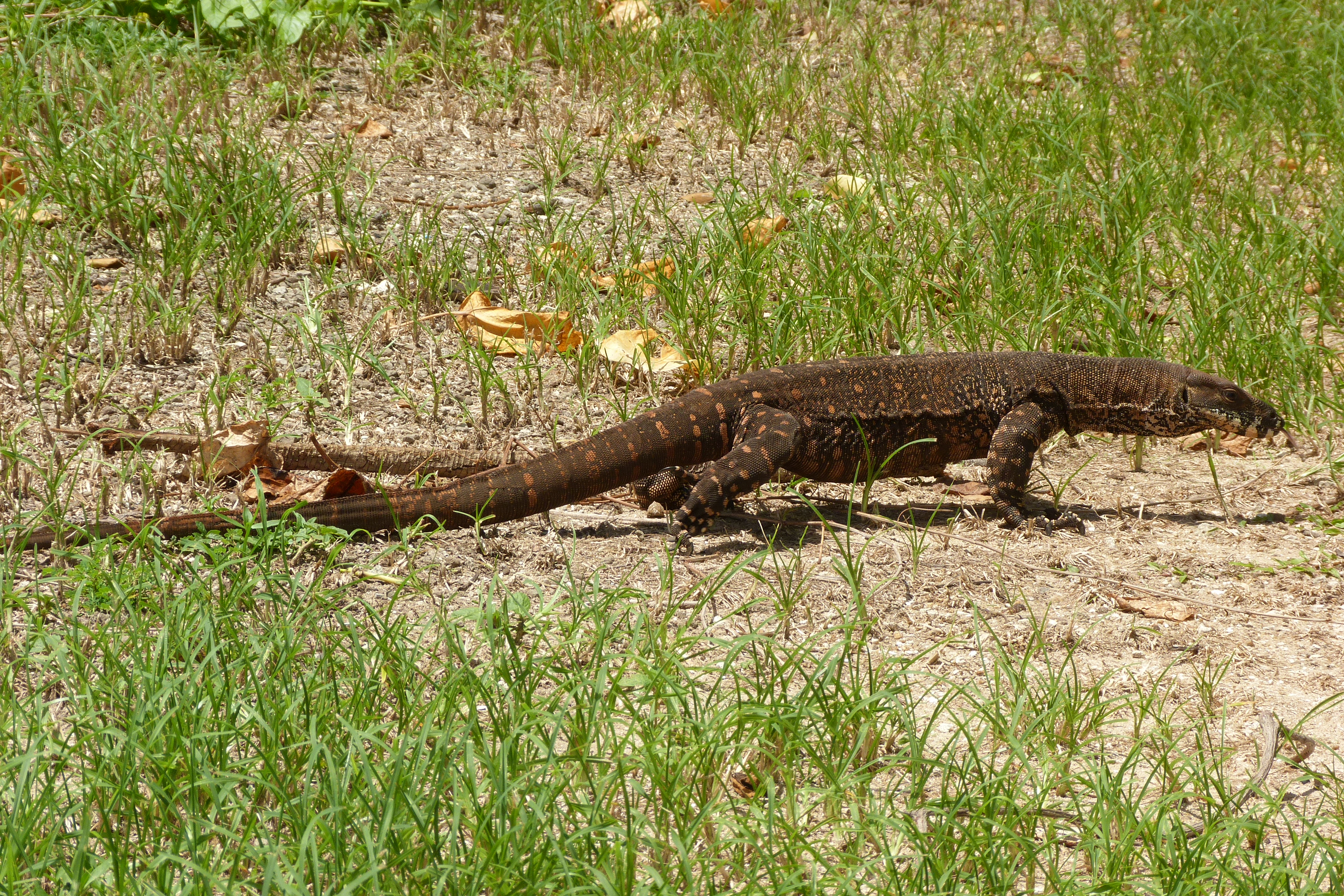
The lace monitor (V. varius) has the typical body build of a true monitor

True monitors are characterized by their wide skulls and strong jaws, with the nostrils cranially positioned on the sides of their snout. Their teeth are curved, serrated and concealed by thick lips, making them invisible even if their mouths are open. Their tongues are forked like a snake's, which they use to pick up scent. Like all monitors, they have slender, elongated necks. The tails are heavy and muscular, being thick at the base and laterally compressed towards the end. Most true monitors have lean bodies with long tails that can take up over half of their entire body length, but the largest species are very robust and have proportionally short tails. The perentie, however, has exceptionally long limbs with their bodies lifted high above the ground, giving them great maneuverability and allowing them to truly run on all fours. True monitors are usually born with thick stripes of highly contrasting colours on their bodies, which would slowly morph into the loose speckles or stripes of an adult. The tail usually remains striped into adulthood, and many members have a long section at the end of their tails being white or lightly coloured, which is especially common in Australian species.

=== Size ===
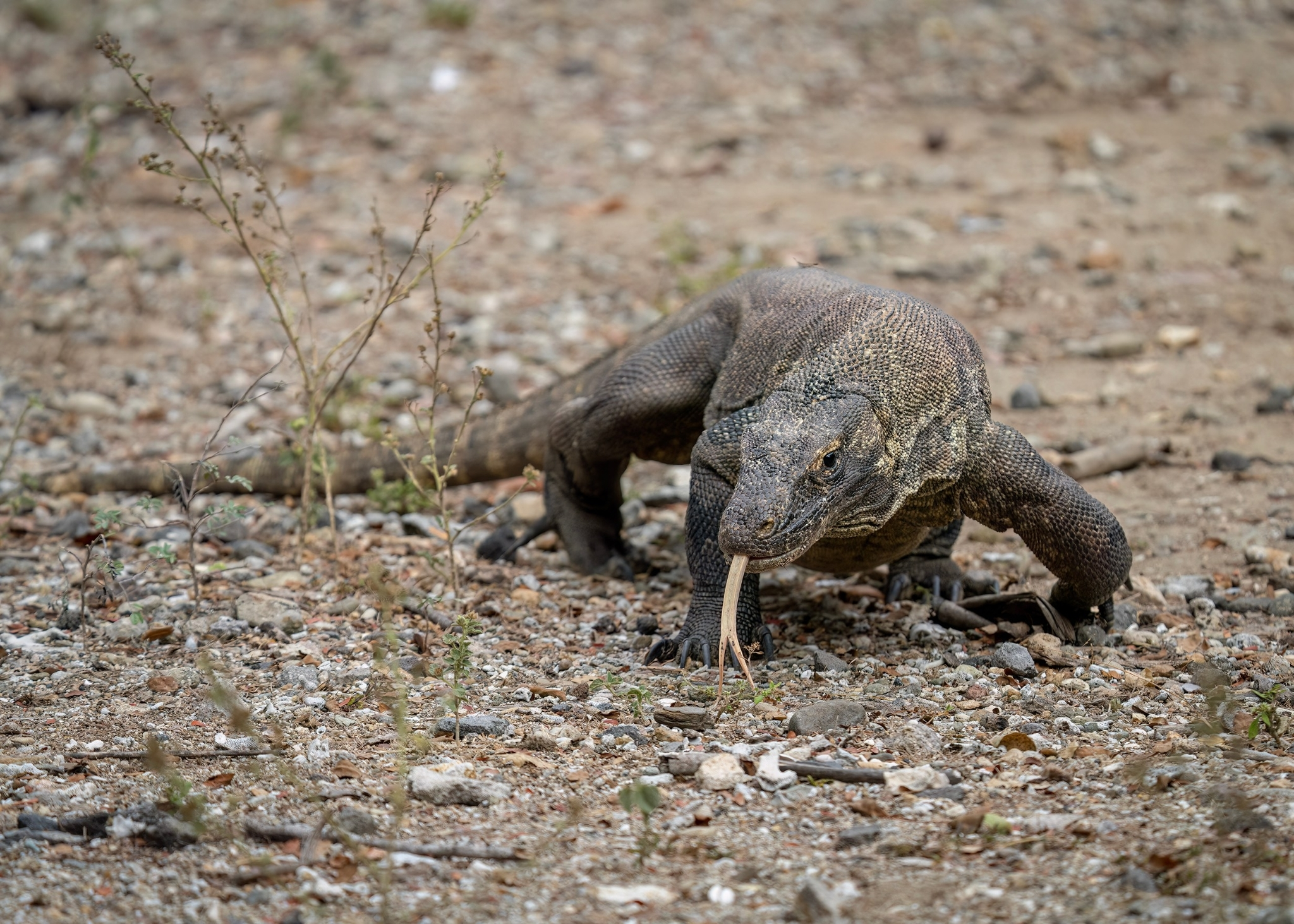
The Komodo dragon (V. komodoensis) is the largest living lizard species

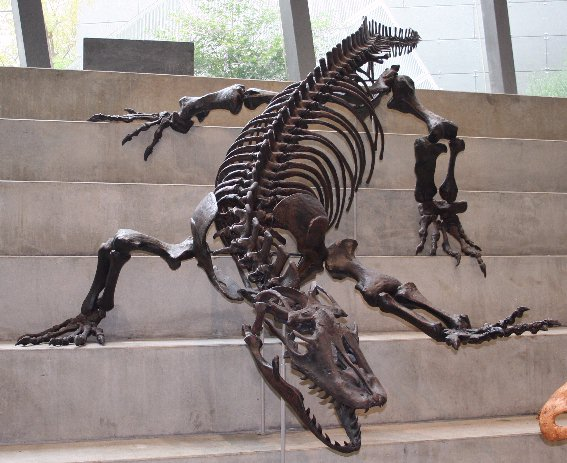
Megalania (†V. priscus) skeleton cast at the Melbourne Museum

True monitors gave rise to the largest known terrestrial squamates ever to exist. Most species are medium-sized among monitors, with adults measuring 1 to 2 m (3 ft 3 in to 6 ft 7 in) in length and rarely exceeding weights of 10 kg (22 lb). In contrast, modern perenties can grow to lengths of 2 m (6 ft 7 in) and, although being exceptionally lean among large lizards, still exceeds weights of over 17 kg (37 lb), easily making them the largest extant lizard in Oceania. Komodo dragons, doubtlessly the largest extant lizard, has their largest known specimen measuring 3.13 m (10.3 ft) in length and, with a full stomach of food, weighs 166 kg (366 lb). Because Komodo monitors can eat up to 60% their own body weight, this weight record is considered invalid, while other specimens suggest a maximum weight range of 90 to 100 kg (200 to 220 lb). This maximum size is surpassed by large snakes like the green anaconda (up to 97.5 kg (215 lb) in the wild) and the reticulated python (up to 150 kg (330 lb) in captivity), but considering that these exceptionally large specimens are reported at a much lower frequency, it is still arguable that the Komodo dragon is the largest extant squamate on Earth. Megalania, which went extinct in the Pleistocene around 50,000 years ago, measures over 5.5 m (18 ft) in length and weighs more than 575 kg (1,268 lb) according to estimates made by Wroe et al. in 2009, making it easily the largest terrestrial squamate ever. Among all the squamates, this size is only known to be surpassed by the semi-aquatic boids such as Titanoboa from the Paleocene and the fully aquatic mosasaurs such as Mosasaurus from the Maastrichtian.

== Ecology ==
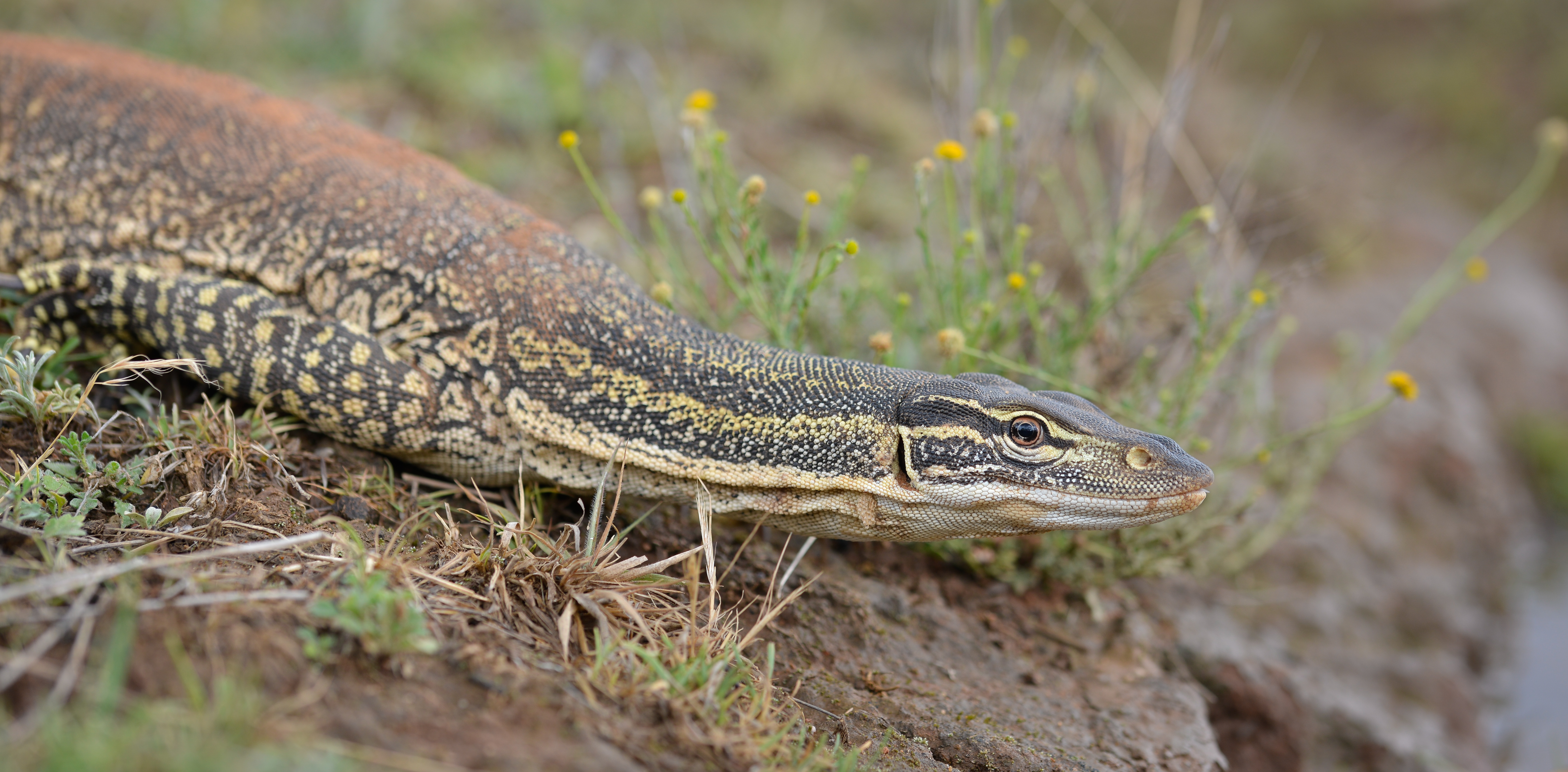
Closeup of a sand goanna (V. gouldii)

True monitors have eyes with retinas that are almost entirely composed of cone cells, giving them excellent colour vision during daytime but nearly no night vision due to the lack of rod cells, which are vital for seeing in low-light environments. Like most lizard, true monitors are oviparous, and some are capable of parthenogenesis. They have been occasionally seen guarding their nests.

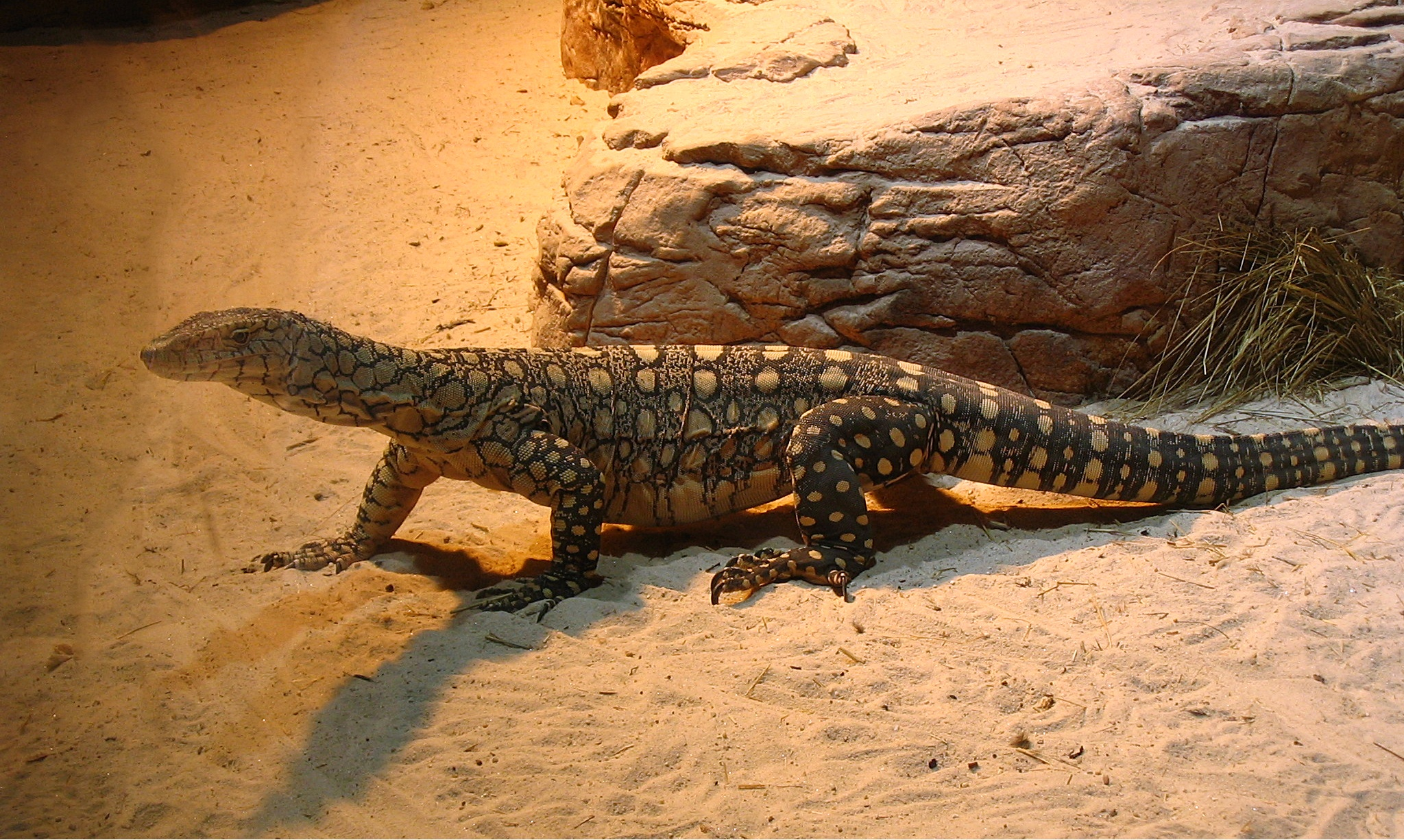
A perentie (V. giganteus), showing its proportionately long limbs.

While most reptiles are considered to have three-chambered hearts, the hearts of true monitors – as with those of other monitors – have a well developed ventricular septum that completely separates the pulmonary and systemic sides of the circulatory system during systole. This allows their hearts to temporarily function like a four chambered heart, which in turn ensure that oxygenated blood is quickly distributed to the body without also flooding the lungs with high-pressure blood. The highly efficient circulatory system, combined with their strong limbs, allow true monitors to become powerful sprinters. However, the primitive sprawling limbs would limit both the speed and stamina of the larger species. The perentie is the fastest of all monitors with a recorded speed of up to 10 m/s (33 ft/s) or 36 km/h (22 mph), rivalling the aquatic leatherback turtle as the fastest extant reptile. The Komodo dragon is significantly slower, reaching speeds of just 5–6 m/s (16–20 ft/s), although that is enough for it to chase goats and deer, which it mostly preys on. Being the largest true monitor, Megalania is yet slower, with its estimated top speed no more than 3 m/s (9.8 ft/s).

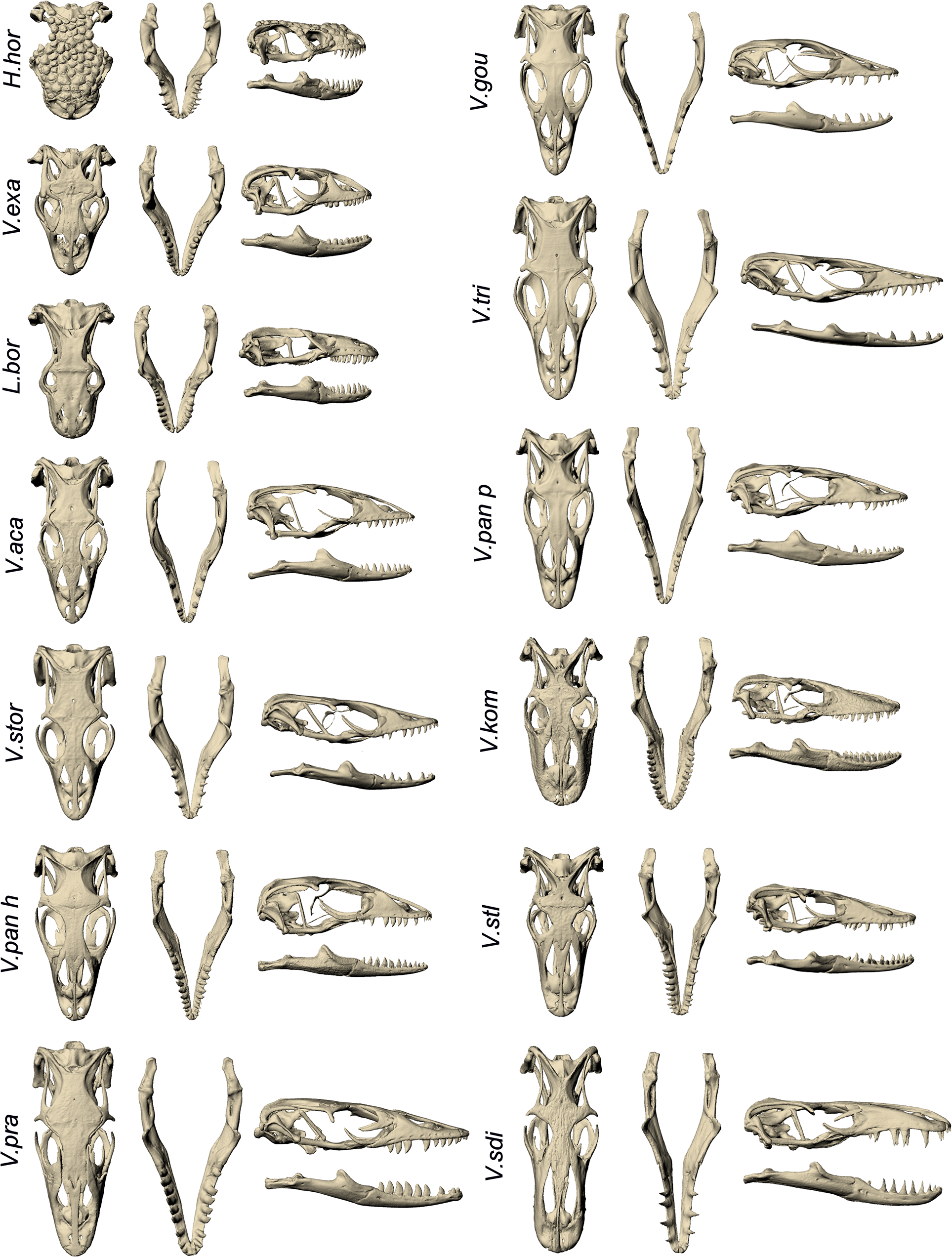
Skull anatomy of Varanus komodoensis (4th row on the right) compared with other varanoids

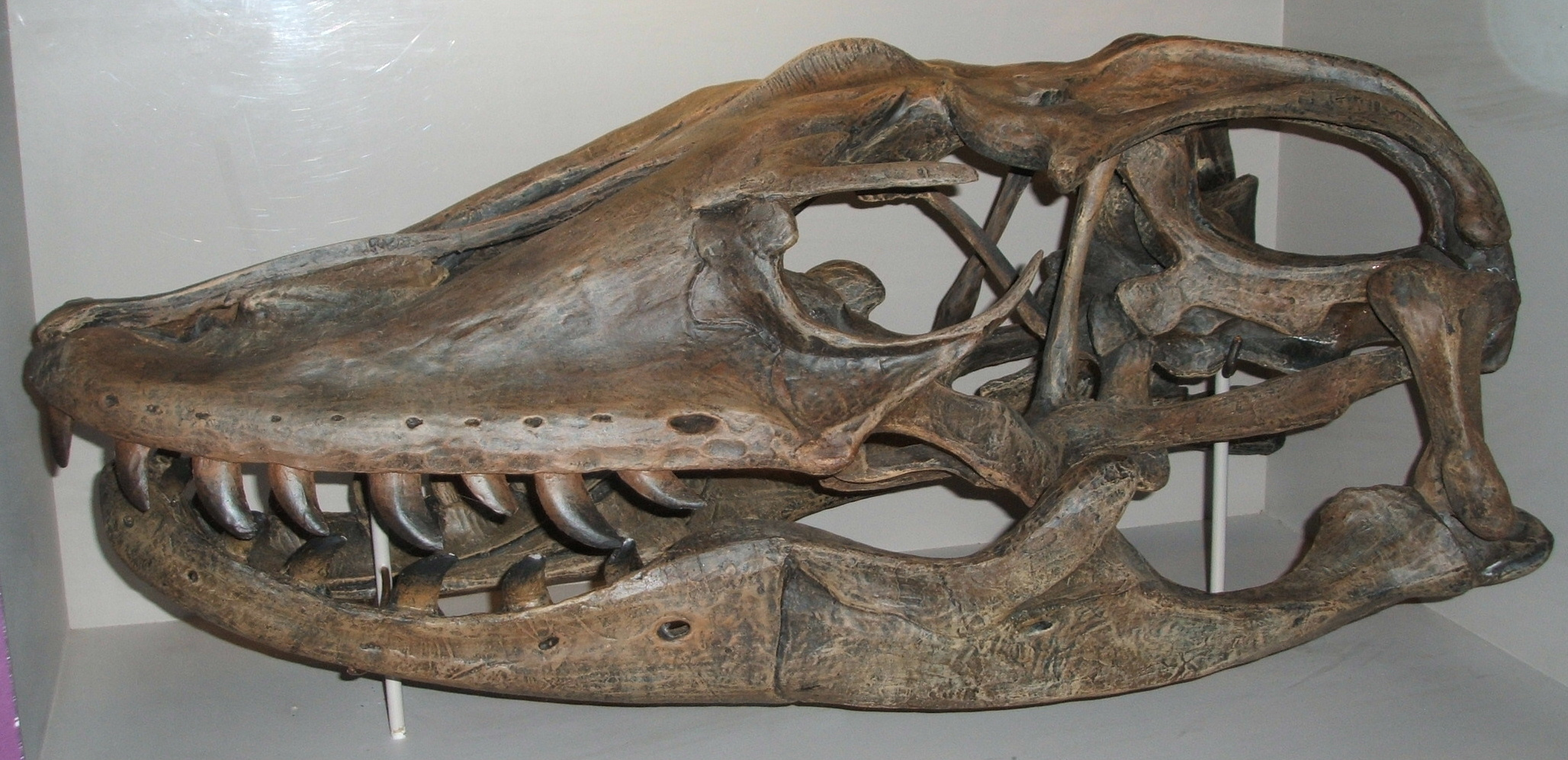
Skull cast of †Varanus priscus

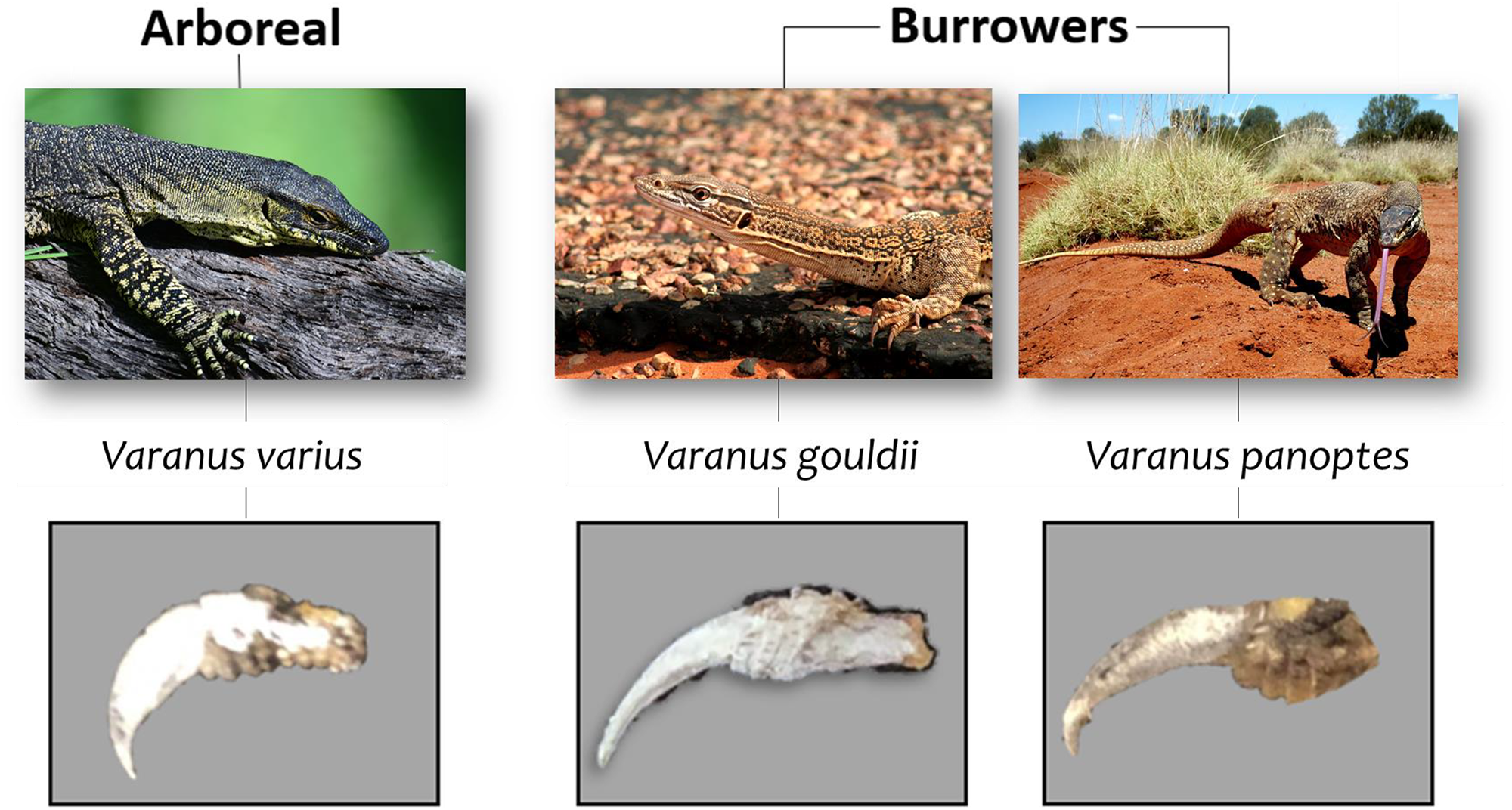
Claws have different morphologies based on niche.

True monitors are most well known by their maximum size, but what really distinguishes them from other monitors is their great evolutionary potential to kill large prey in relation to their own body size, allowing them to occupy the niche of apex predators in most of their biomes. As the ruler of modern Australia, perenties have to prey on other lizards nearly their own size since birth, and the species adapted by developing an unusually large head-to-body ratio. Komodo dragons are the only extant lizards to hunt large mammals, regularly preying on water buffalos that are even heavier than them. Megalania, being the most massive terrestrial reptile back then, would have competed with predators like Thylacoleo to prey on marsupials as big as Procoptodon and even the Diprotodon, the largest of them that ever existed.

Whether true monitors carry toxin is a long debated topic. Experiments have shown that the saliva of Komodo dragons are not considerably different compared to other predators, thus dispelling the theory that monitors kill with bacteria. It is verified that like all monitors or possibly all lizards, true monitors have special glands in their jaws, which is almost certainly a homologous feature for these reptiles. However, not all agree that these can be called venom glands, especially since the effect of them are too mild for prey to most lizard and especially true monitors, who often hunt prey that are simply too large to rely on venom for a kill.

True monitors live in Australia alongside the much smaller and more diverse dwarf monitors. Their dominance was challenged but remained stable in the face of invasive species. Among them, desert-dwelling true monitors (perenties, sand goannas, Argus monitors, Rosenberg's monitors and Spencer's goannas) all remain a status of least concern on the IUCN Red List with their populations large and stable.

== Taxonomy ==
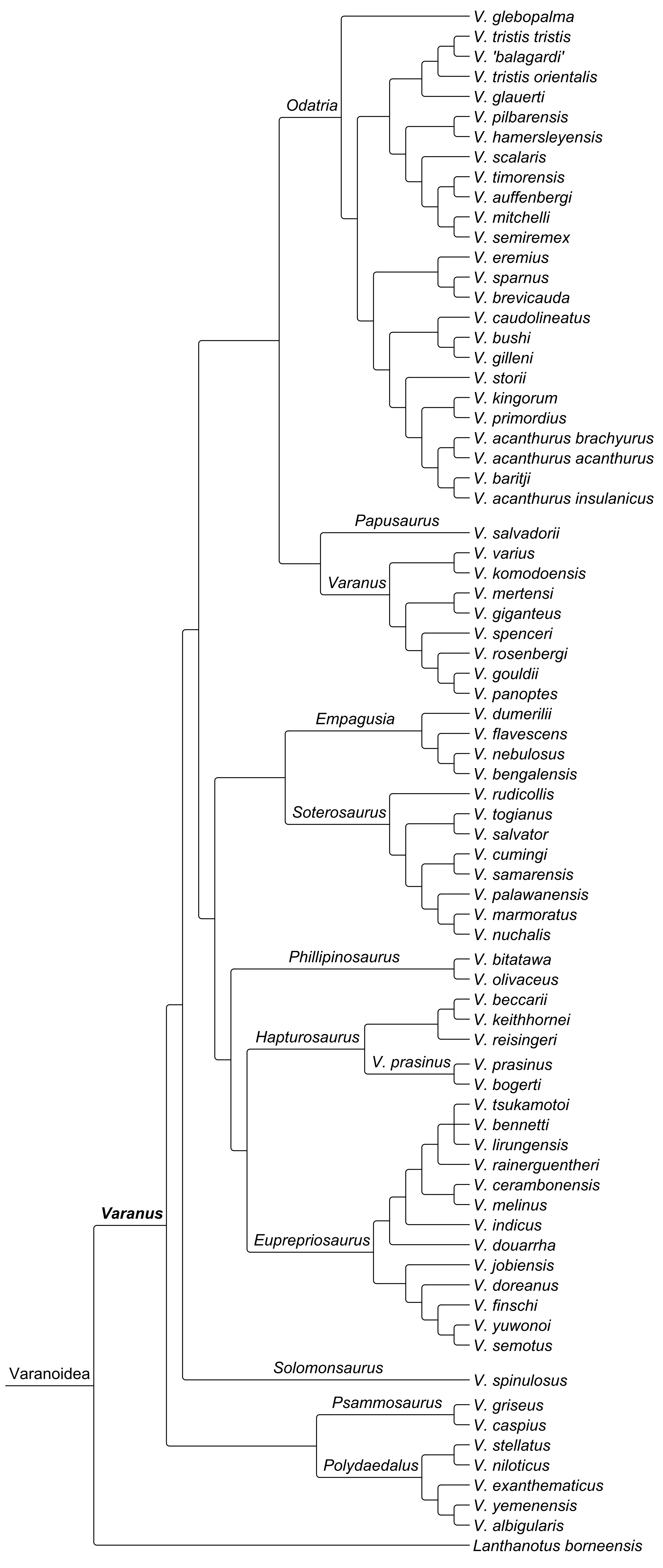
Evolutionary relationships within the genus Varanus

The genus Varanus is believed to have originated in South Asia in the Miocene epoch around 20 million years ago, and the anatomy of its earliest members are thought to resemble today's Indian group, which includes modern yellow monitors (subgenus Empagusia) like the Bengal monitor. They then spread across the Old World in two directions: the Afro-Arabian group, including the subgenera Polydaedalus and Psammosaurus moved west towards West Asia and Africa, developing tall skulls and round teeth which aid in crushing shelled prey. Meanwhile, the Indo-Australian group, including subgenera Euprepiosaurus, Hapturosaurus, Odatria, Papusaurus, Phillipinosaurus, Solomonsaurus, Soterosaurus and Varanus moved east towards Southeast Asia, quickly diversifying into a variety of different niches. Subgenus Papusaurus, with their only extant species being the crocodile monitor, are considered the closest relatives of true monitors. Around 15 million years ago, a land bridge connecting Indochina and Australia appeared, allowing the ancestors of today's true monitors to enter Oceania. They then produced members with colossal sizes such as early Komodo dragons and Megalania, possibly by outcompeting large local marsupial predators such as Thylacinus and Thylacoleo.

During the Miocene, Komodo dragons hybridized with the common ancestor of V. panoptes, V. gouldii, V. rosenbergi, and V. spenceri, supporting fossil evidence that Komodo dragons once inhabited Australia.
