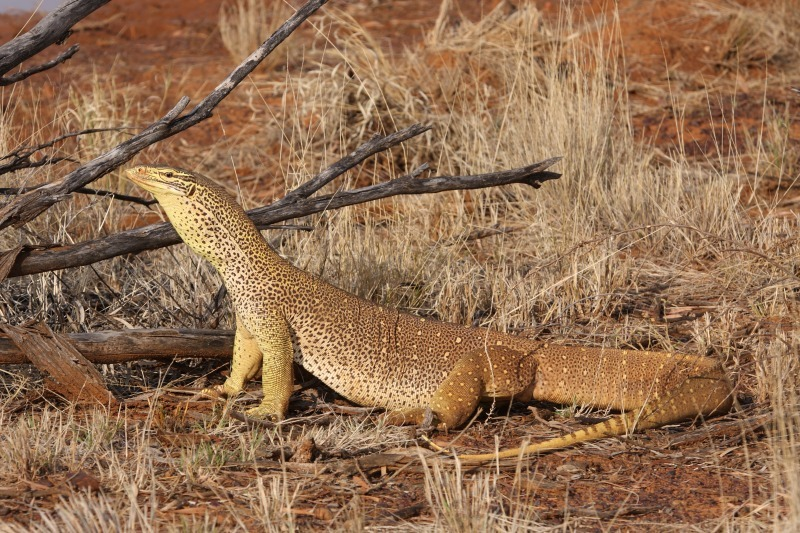
- V. p. panoptes in Queensland, Australia

Conservation status
- Least Concern (IUCN 3.1)

Scientific classification
- Kingdom: Animalia
- Phylum: Chordata
- Class: Reptilia
- Order: Squamata
- Suborder: Anguimorpha
- Family: Varanidae
- Genus: Varanus
- Subgenus: Varanus
- Species: V. panoptes

Binomial name
- Varanus panoptes Storr, 1980

Subspecies
- V. p. panoptes; V. p. rubidus; V. p. horni
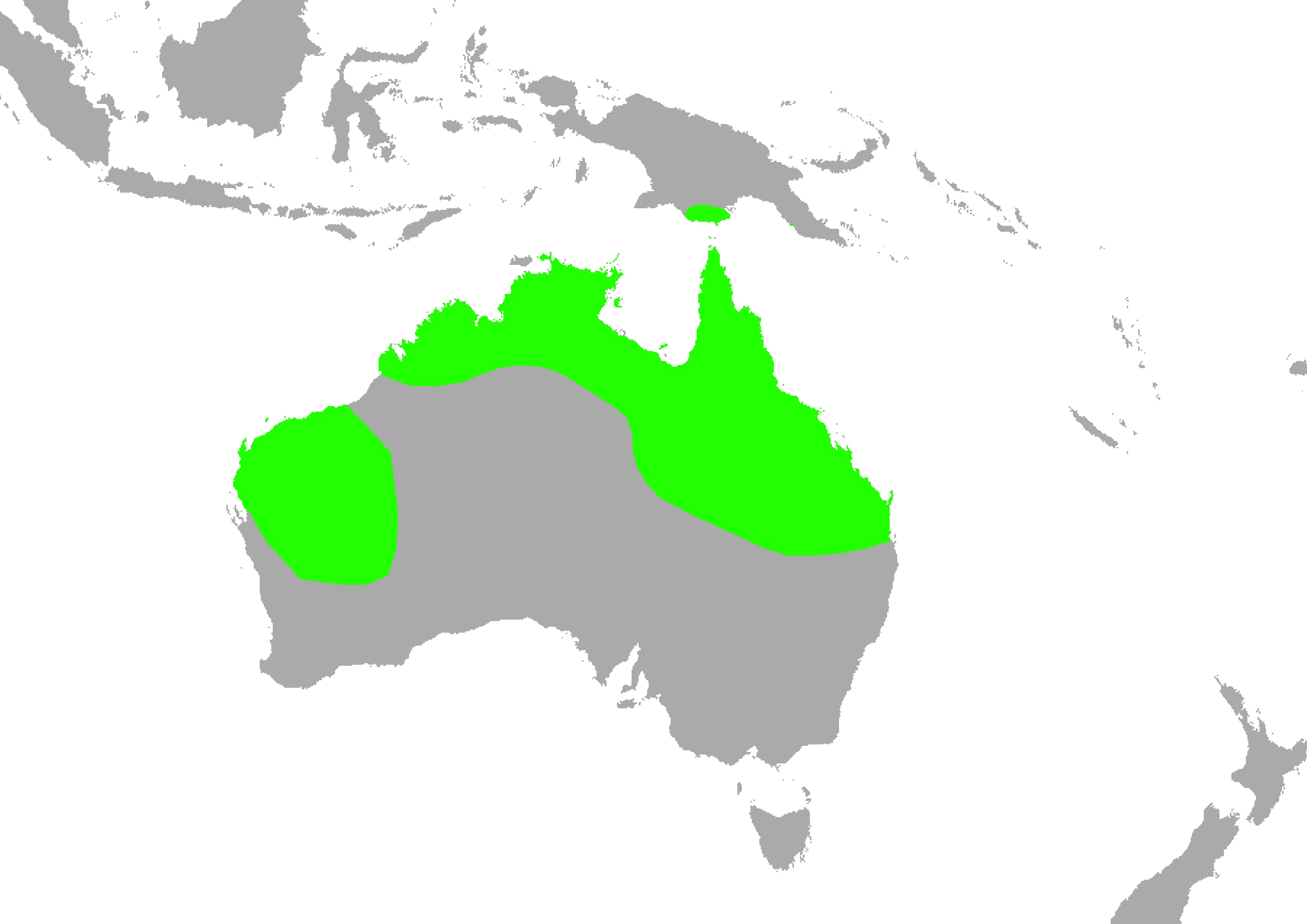

= Yellow-spotted monitor =

Species of reptile

The yellow-spotted monitor (Varanus panoptes), also known as the Argus monitor, is a monitor lizard found in northern and western regions of Australia and southern New Guinea.

== Taxonomy ==
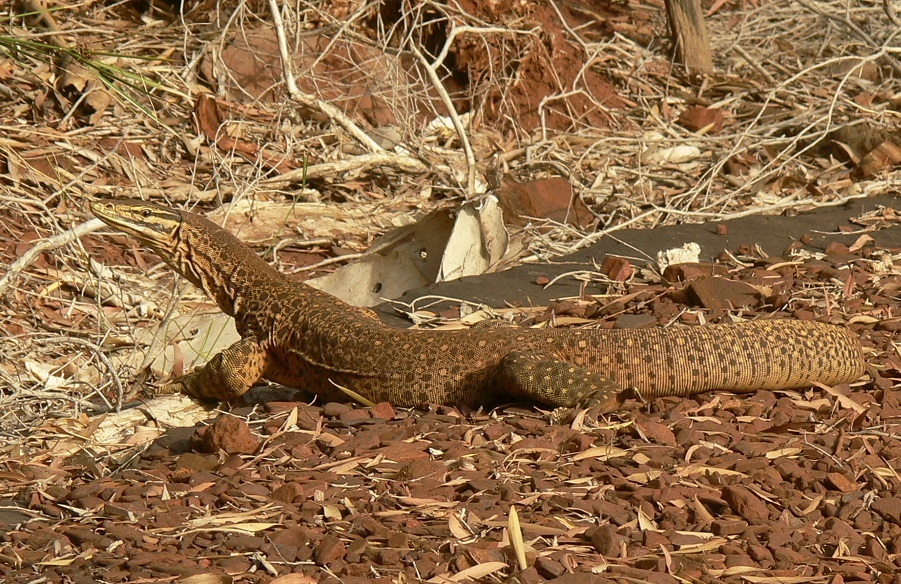
V. p. rubidus, Western Australia

The first description of the species was provided in a revision of the varanids of Western Australia, where the family is represented by diverse taxa in a wide variety of habitats. Early collections and descriptions of the region's species have historically been uncertain, leading the ICZN to issue an opinion that related to this taxon. A third subspecies was published in 1988, based on specimens from southern New Guinea. The describing author discovered that the specimen selected as the lectotype of Varanus gouldii was in fact assignable to this species, recently described by reptile specialist Glenn Storr. By issuing an opinion on the various taxonomic considerations, the voting members conserved the name published with John Edward Gray's description and stabilised the nomenclature of this species name.

The epithet panoptes was inspired by a mythological figure with one hundred eyes, the protector of Princess Io named Argus Panoptes. The species may be referred to as the floodplains goanna in the northern regions of Australia.

=== Subspecies ===
Three subspecies are recognised by the Australian Faunal Directory and the Reptile Database:

- Varanus panoptes rubidus Storr, 1980. The holotype of this subspecies was obtained near Cue, Western Australia, at the midwest of the continent, and the population is endemic to the north and west of that state. ('rubidus' referring to its reddish coloration)
- Varanus panoptes panoptes, Storr, 1980. The nominate subspecies occurring across the north of mainland Australia, Arnhem Land, the Kimberley and Cape York Peninsula.
- Varanus panoptes horni, Böhme, 1988. A population that discovered in southern New Guinea that was recognised as having a close affinity to the description of this species. It is also known as Horn's monitor.

== Description ==
This ground dwelling monitor species, somewhat resembles the widespread sand goanna (Varanus gouldii). Large, dark spots appear in rows along its back, becoming especially distinct at the center of the back where they are interspersed with smaller and paler spots. Bands of color occur toward the tip of the tail. The overall coloration is brownish in the nominate subspecies, V. panoptes panoptes, and reddish in V. panoptes rubidus.

The Argus monitor displays great sexual dimorphism, with the female reaching an average total length of three feet (90 cm), while the male reaches an average of 4–5 feet (120–150 cm). The largest specimens can have a length in 1.6 m (5 ft 3 in) and a mass in 7 kg (15 lb). It is the third largest lizard in Australia, after perentie and lace monitor. The larger subspecies is V. panoptes panoptes and the smaller one is V. panoptes horni. It is a reasonably lean monitor and does not put on the bulk that other monitors in Africa and Asia do. Most Argus monitors are yellow in colour, with a background of brown or dark tan, but their colour often varies on an individual basis or on their place of origin.

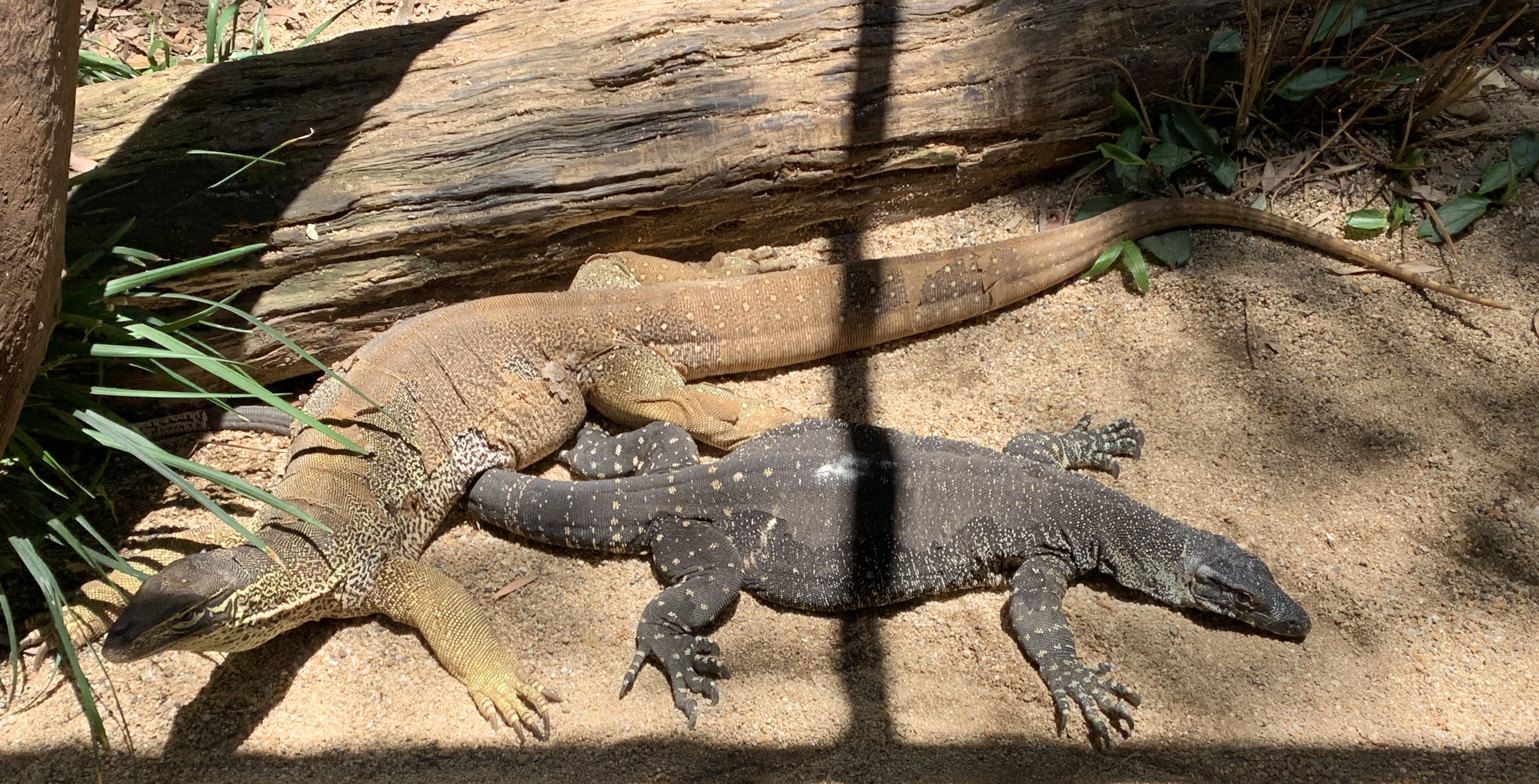
Yellow-spotted monitor (left), lace monitor (right), in captivity.

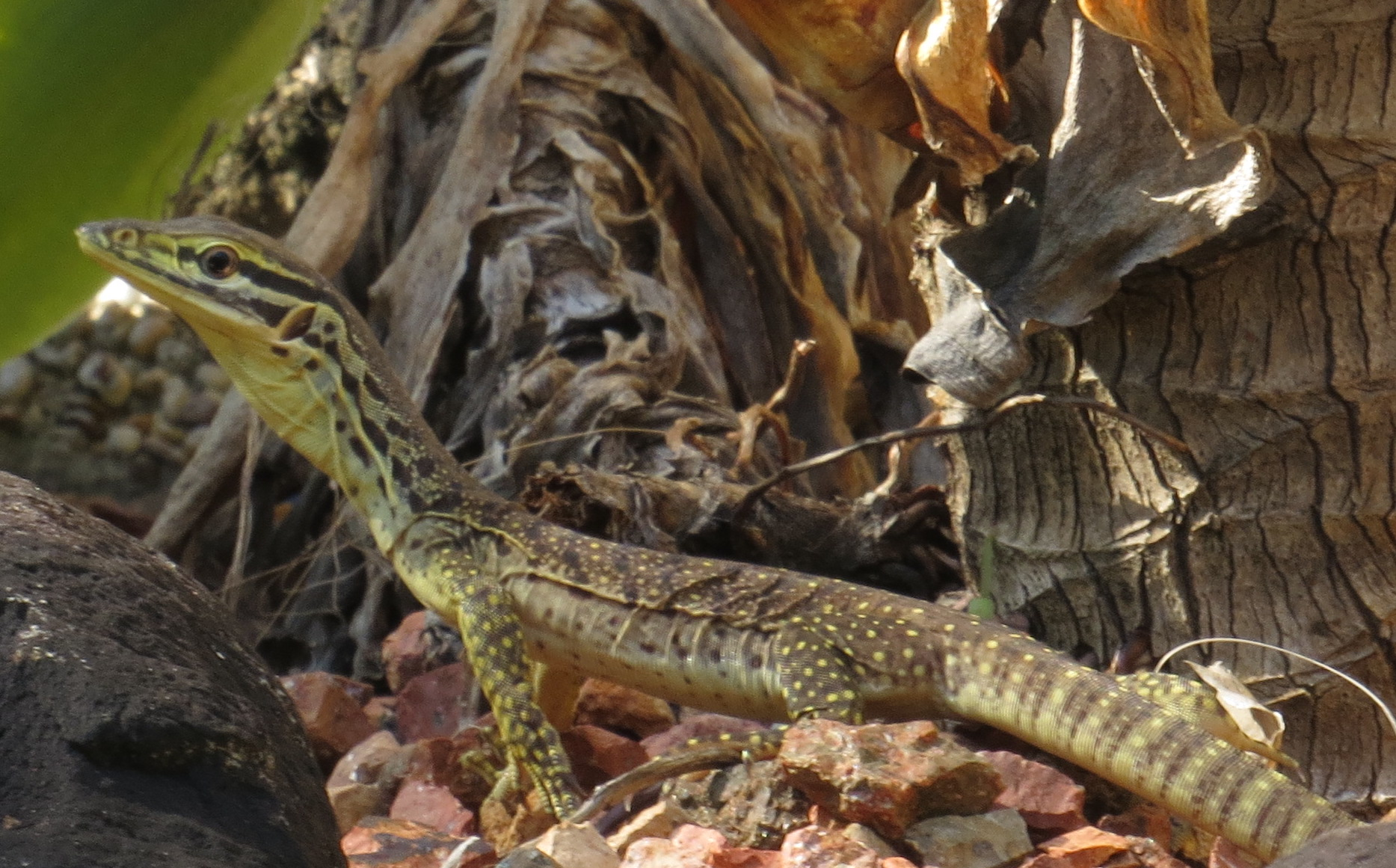
Juvenile V. p. panoptes

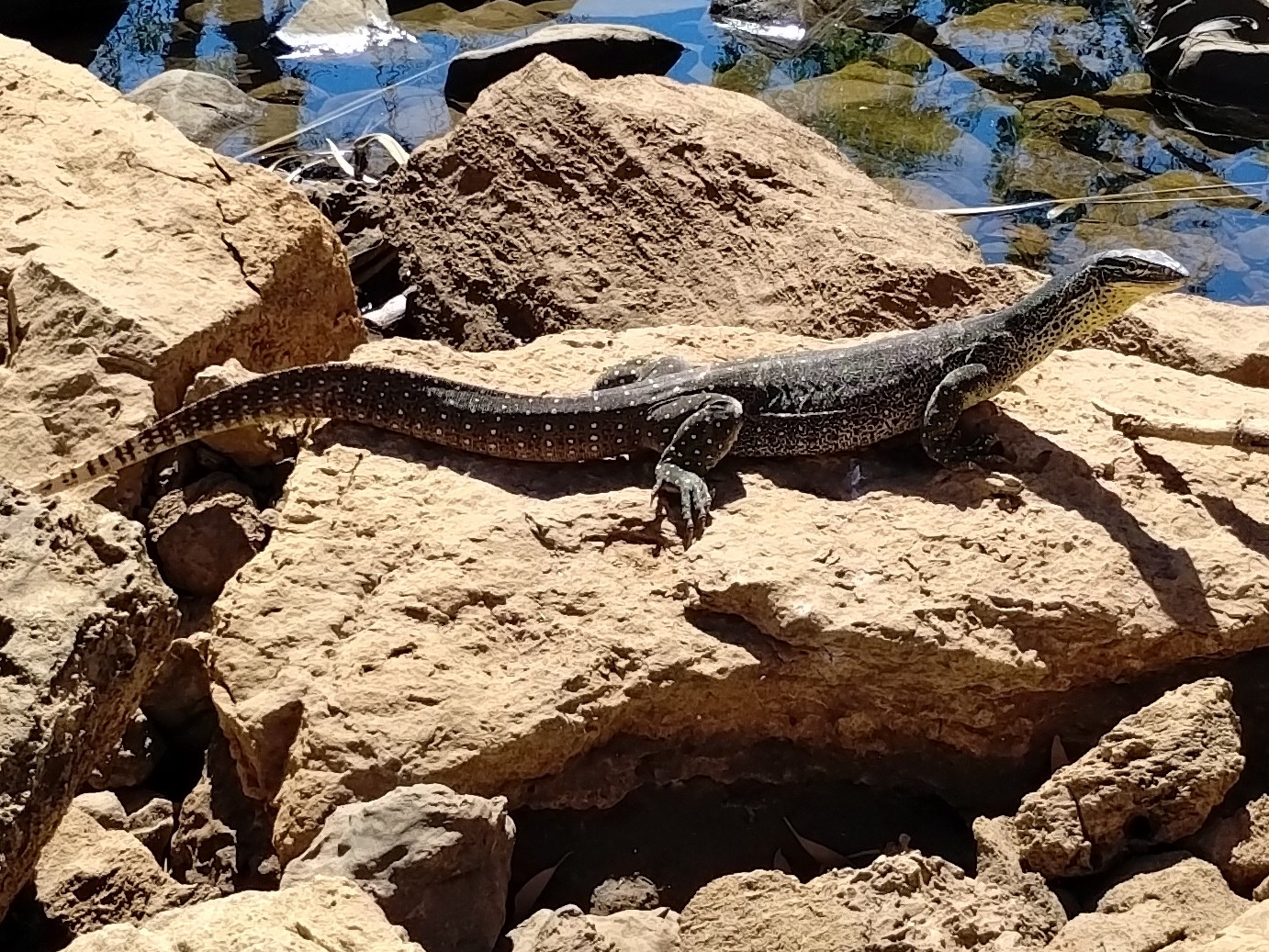
Adult V. p. panoptes

== Life cycle and reproduction ==
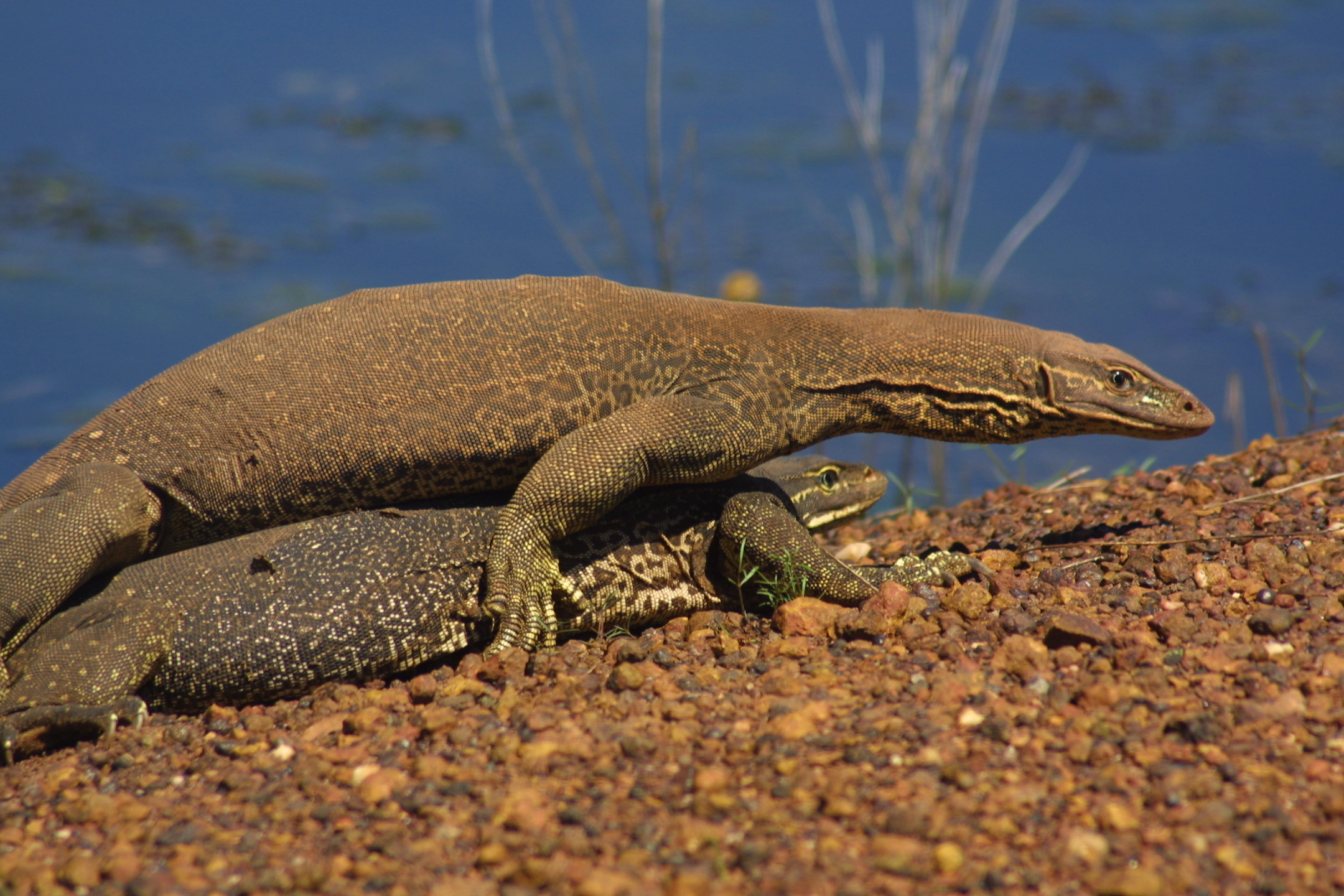
V. p. panoptes mating, at Fogg Dam (NT)

Argus monitors have an unusually "fast" life cycle compared to other monitors. Large-bodied monitors usually take 2 or more years to reach sexual maturity, but Argus monitors may do so in less than 1 year (though this varies among populations). Males grow faster than females and also live longer; in the Kimberley, male monitors have a mean age of 465 days versus 263 days for females.

In Arnhem Land, they lay 6 to 13 eggs between January and February. Due to similar genetic structures, the Argus monitor is able to naturally hybridise with the Gould's monitor with a stable hybrid zone.

Argus monitors may utilize communal warrens. These interconnected systems of underground burrows are sometimes used by multiple argus monitors; one study found at least 6 individuals utilizing the same warren. These warrens also possibly accommodate communal nesting, where different females each dig their own egg burrows within the same warren.

These lizards create helical nest burrows with an average depth of 2.6 m, the deepest known burrow of any vertebrate (as of 2015). The function of such deep burrows may be to protect the eggs from temperature fluctuations, drying out, and/or cannibalism by males during their 8-month-long gestation.

== Behavior ==
Argus monitors are versatile predators and inhabits a large variety of biomes and habitats. They are primarily terrestrial, meaning they spend a great deal of time on the ground. This species is an avid digger and will dig large burrows or take over an already existing burrow, where they spend a sizable portion of their time. Despite this, they will eagerly forage in trees and in the water. These large lizards are quite fast and will run up to 100 metres away to the nearest tree or burrow when they are chased. They are riparian in habits and as such, can usually be found around a permanent source of water. Argus monitors will often "tripod", raising up on their hind legs and supporting themselves with their tail. This unusual behavior is used to spot potential prey or enemies from a distance or when they are threatened. They exhibit this behavior regularly in captivity as well. This habit provides them a unique characteristic that separates them from most other monitors.

Its prey consists of almost anything that it can overpower. This includes fish, crabs, small birds, rodents, insects and even other monitors. They hunt for prey by keying in on movement, chasing it down and overpowering it. In captivity, this monitor has been observed swinging rodent prey around rapidly by the tail in what appears to be an attempt to stun the animal, before biting at the prey's neck. Argus monitors frequently prey on the dwarf monitors that it shares its range with. Spiny-tailed goannas and Kimberley rock monitors are eaten regularly. Argus monitors have great senses, with smell being the most acute. Like all monitors, they have a forked tongue and a vomeronasal organ in the roof of its mouth. It uses this organ in the same manner as snakes and other monitor species do and can often be seen flicking their tongues in search of a meal.

Argus monitors have also been recorded diving underwater to forage for freshwater Velesunio mussels, during the dry season when terrestrial food is scarce.

Recent studies suggest that the infestation of cane toads, a novel and toxic species, has severely damaged the population structure of yellow-spotted monitors within the Top End. It is estimated that numbers have dropped by as much as 90% in many areas. Yellow-spotted monitors are more vulnerable to cane toads than similar-sized lace monitors, because the former are "risky" foragers that more readily consume novel prey such as cane toads. It appears they can be taught to avoid cane toads if exposed to toads that are too young to be lethal if ingested. In experimental areas where 200,000 total cane toad eggs, tadpoles, and metamorphs were introduced ahead of an inevitable invasion front, substantial populations of monitors persisted following invasion by wild toads. In control areas where "teacher toads" were not introduced, yellow-spotted monitor populations crashed.

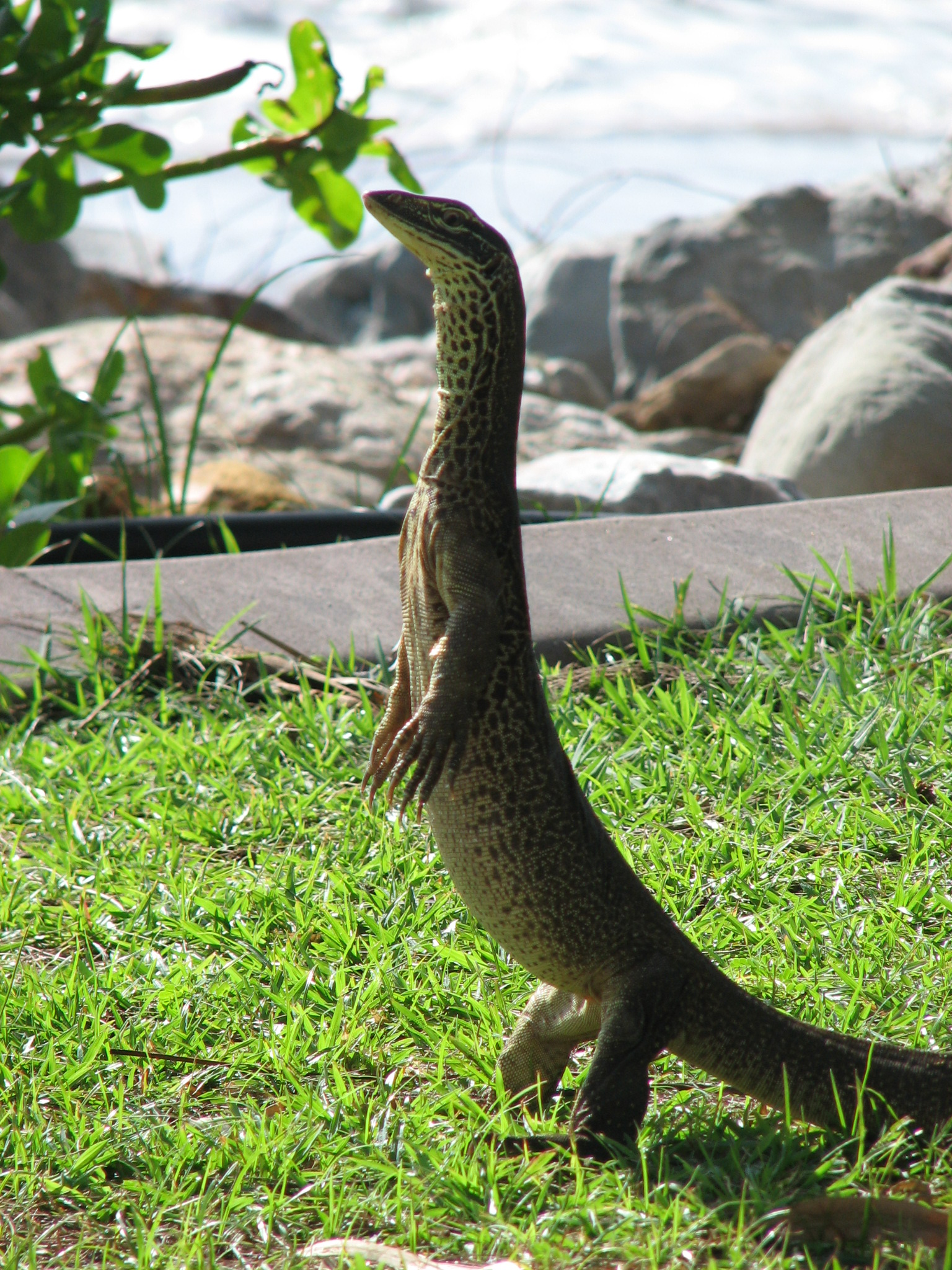
V. p. panoptes "tripod" stance, in Darwin (NT).

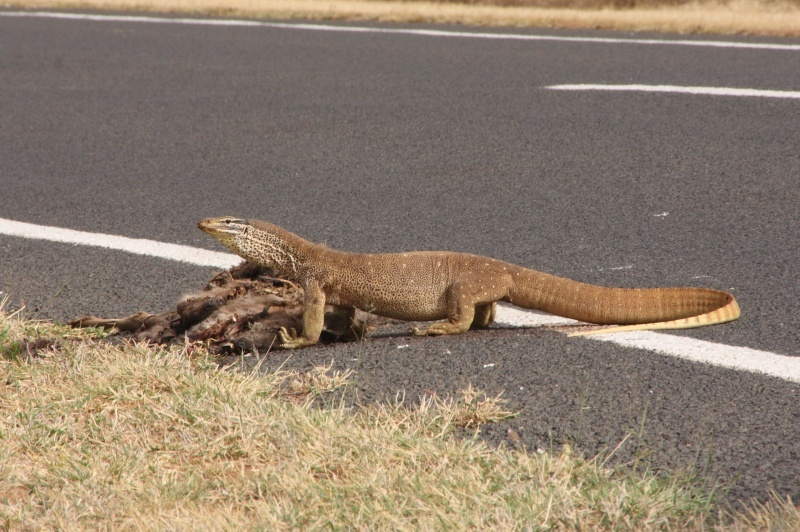
V. p. panoptes feeding on a road-killed kangaroo.

== Ecology ==
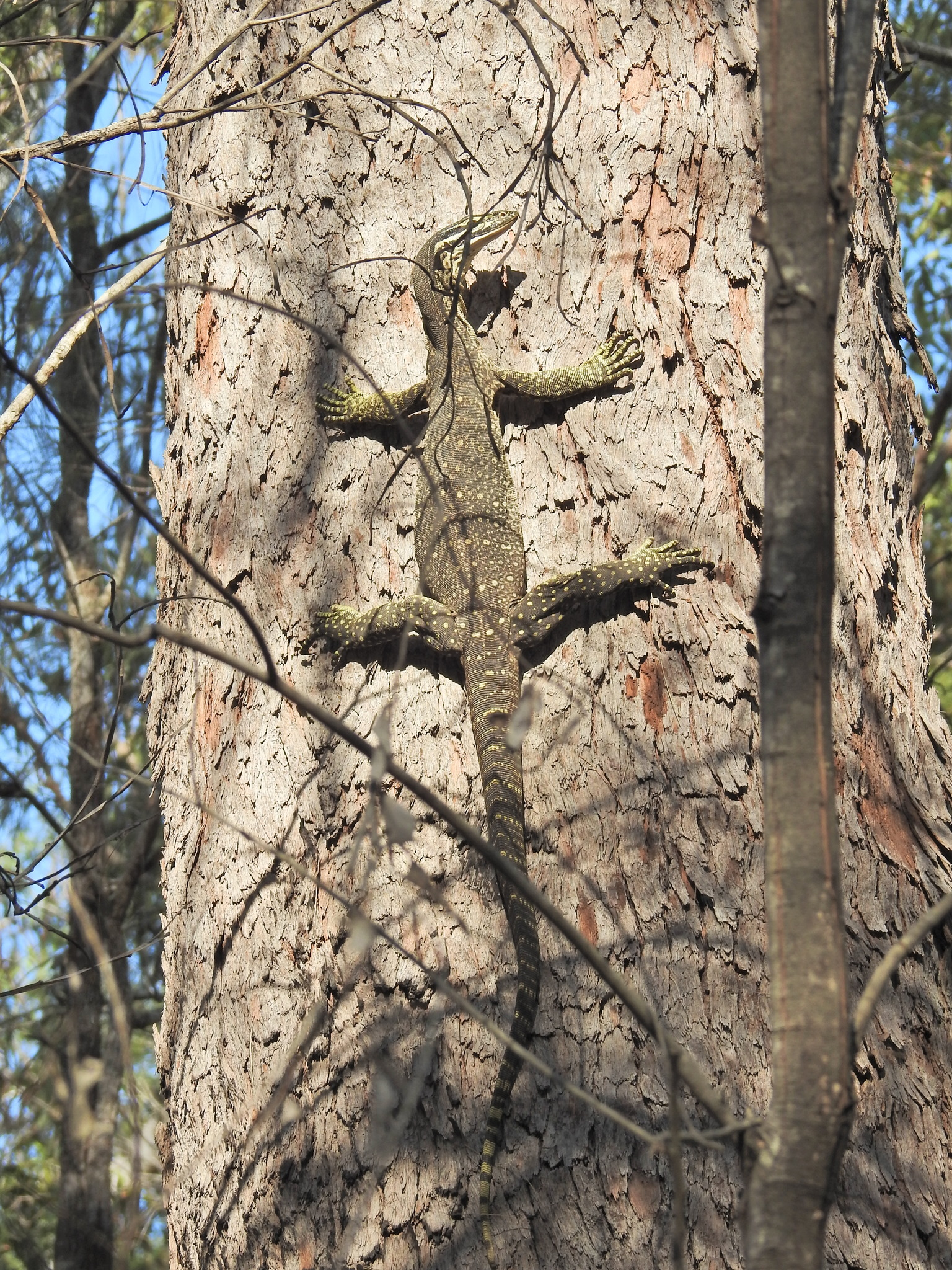
V. p. panoptes climbing a tree

Varanus panoptes is an ecosystem engineer. The high abundance, high feeding rate and generalist diet of this species make it an important predator in the ecosystem. The species consumes more prey than co-occurring predators such as dingoes or black kites, because while these predators consume more on an individual basis, monitor population densities are far higher (25 monitors/km^{2}, versus 0.15 dingoes/km^{2} or 0.2 kites/km^{2}). Toad-induced declines in Argus monitor populations result in increases in populations of their prey, such as common tree snakes (Dendrelaphis punctulatus) becoming 26–46 times more abundant (though this may include toad impacts on other monitor species as well). Additionally, the burrows dug by these monitors are used by other species of animals.

Argus monitors are themselves preyed on by black-headed pythons (Aspidites melanocephalus) and olive pythons (Lialis olivaceus).

== In captivity ==
Many individuals of this species are captive bred as a conservation effort against poisoning from the cane toad infestation of the species' native range and as exotic pets. Argus monitors are fed insects, fish and mice. Argus monitors are husky lizards that can be a challenge to physically handle, do not like to be restrained, and can use their sharp claws in their attempts to squirm free. If left to wander freely on open ground, their ability to suddenly flee makes escape likely. Argus monitors prefer to bask each morning and return to bask as needed to maintain optimal body temperatures at 80 to 90 °F (26.7 to 32.2 °C). Night-time temperatures may drop 20 °F (11.1 °C) or more if the opportunity to warm up the next day exists.

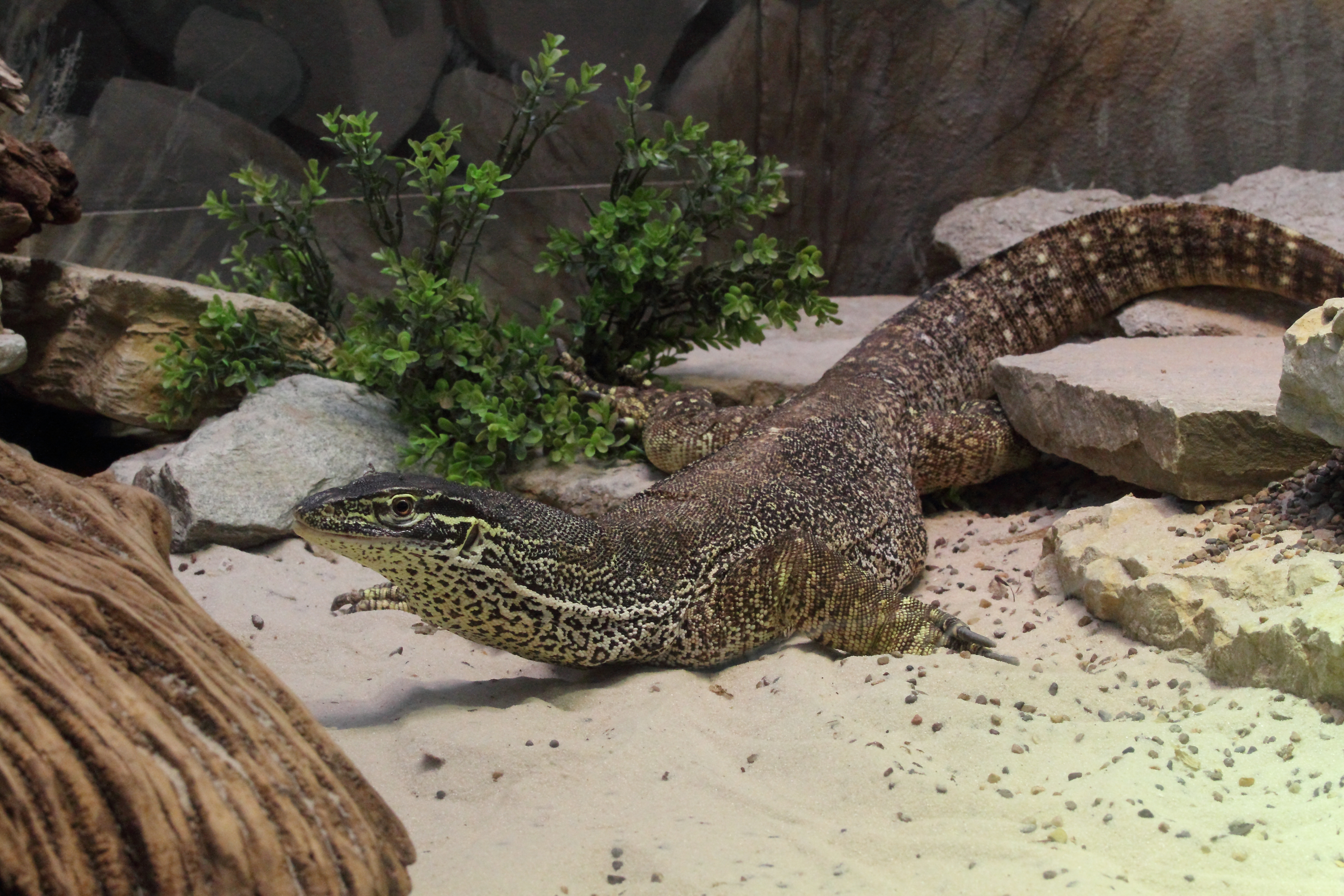
At the Cincinnati Zoo
