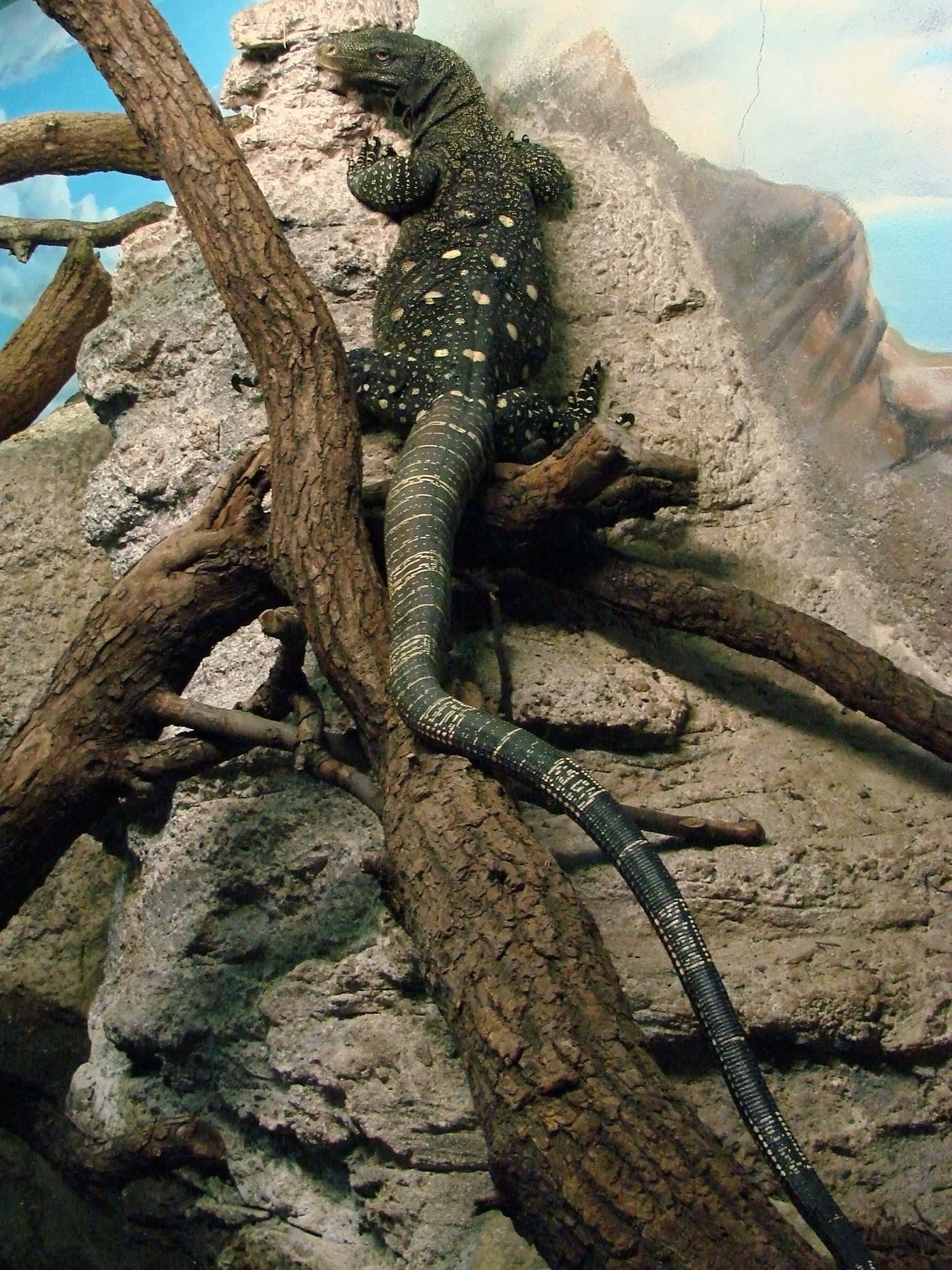

Conservation status
- Least Concern (IUCN 3.1)
- CITES Appendix II

Scientific classification
- Kingdom: Animalia
- Phylum: Chordata
- Class: Reptilia
- Order: Squamata
- Suborder: Anguimorpha
- Family: Varanidae
- Genus: Varanus
- Subgenus: Papusaurus
- Species: V. salvadorii

Binomial name
- Varanus salvadorii (W. Peters & Doria, 1878)
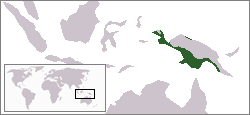
- Estimated range of V. salvadorii, indicated by green

Synonyms
- Monitor salvadorii W. Peters & Doria, 1878; Varanus salvadorii — Boulenger, 1885; Varanus (Papusaurus) salvadorii — Mertens, 1962

= Varanus salvadorii =

Species of lizard

The crocodile monitor (Varanus salvadorii), also known as the Papuan monitor or Salvadori's monitor, is a species of monitor lizard endemic to New Guinea. It is the largest monitor lizard in New Guinea and is one of the longest lizards, verified at up to 255 cm (100 in). Its tail is exceptionally long, with some specimens having been claimed to exceed the length of the Komodo dragon, however less massive.

The crocodile monitor is an arboreal lizard with a dark green body marked with bands of yellowish spots. It has a characteristic blunt snout and a very long prehensile tail. It lives among the mangrove swamps and coastal rainforests of the southeastern part of New Guinea, feeding opportunistically on everything from birds and small mammals to eggs, other reptiles, amphibians and carrion. Its large, backwards-curving teeth are better adapted than those of most monitors for seizing fast-moving prey. Like all monitors, it has anatomical features that enable it to breathe more easily when running than other lizards, and is sometimes considered one of the most agile monitor species.

Crocodile monitors are threatened by deforestation and poaching, and are protected by CITES. Little is known of its reproduction and development, as it is difficult to breed in captivity. Attempts at captive breeding have been mostly unsuccessful. In New Guinea, the lizard is sometimes hunted and skinned by tribesmen to make drums. It is described as an evil spirit that "climbs trees, walks upright, breathes fire, and kills men", yet the local people maintain that it gives warnings if crocodiles are nearby.

== Taxonomy ==
Varanus salvadorii was first described as Monitor salvadorii by Wilhelm Peters and Giacomo Doria in 1878 based on a female specimen with a snout-to-vent length of 48 cm (19 in), and a 114 cm (45 in) long tail. It was subordinated to the genus Varanus under the name Varanus salvadorii by George Albert Boulenger in 1885.

There are no formally recognized subspecies of V. salvadorii, but the captive reptile market distinguishes those from Sorong, Jayapura and Merauke based on the color of their snout and the overall brightness of their color pattern.

== Etymology ==
The generic name, Varanus, is derived from the Arabic waral (ورل), meaning a large type of lizard. The term "monitor" is thought to have come about from confusion between waral and the German warnen, meaning "warning". The term "goanna" came about as a corruption of the name "iguana". The specific name, salvadorii, is derived from a Latinization of Tommaso Salvadori, an Italian ornithologist who worked in New Guinea.

== Evolution ==
The genus Varanus originated in Asia about 40 million years ago (Mya). Around 15 Mya, a tectonic connection between Australia and Southeast Asia allowed the varanids to spread into what is now the Indonesian archipelago.

Based upon DNA sequences of three nuclear and two mitochondrial genes, cladistic analysis identifies the crocodile monitor as a member of a species cluster that includes the lace monitor (V. varius) and the Komodo dragon (V. komodoensis). Morphological considerations suggest that the megalania (V. priscus) was also a member of the group. Monitors apparently colonized Australasia from Asia about 32 Mya; the varius clade then arose about 17 Mya.

== Distribution ==
The largest of the seven species of monitors found on the island of New Guinea, crocodile monitors occur in both the state Papua New Guinea and the Indonesian region of West Papua. It inhabits the high and low canopies of the lowland rainforests and coastal mangrove swamps, sometimes venturing out of these areas during floods in the rainy seasons. No detailed field investigation data are available for V. salvadorii, so the full extent of its range is unknown. Its remote and generally inaccessible habitat is an obstacle to detailed study of this monitor in its natural habitat.

== Biology and morphology ==
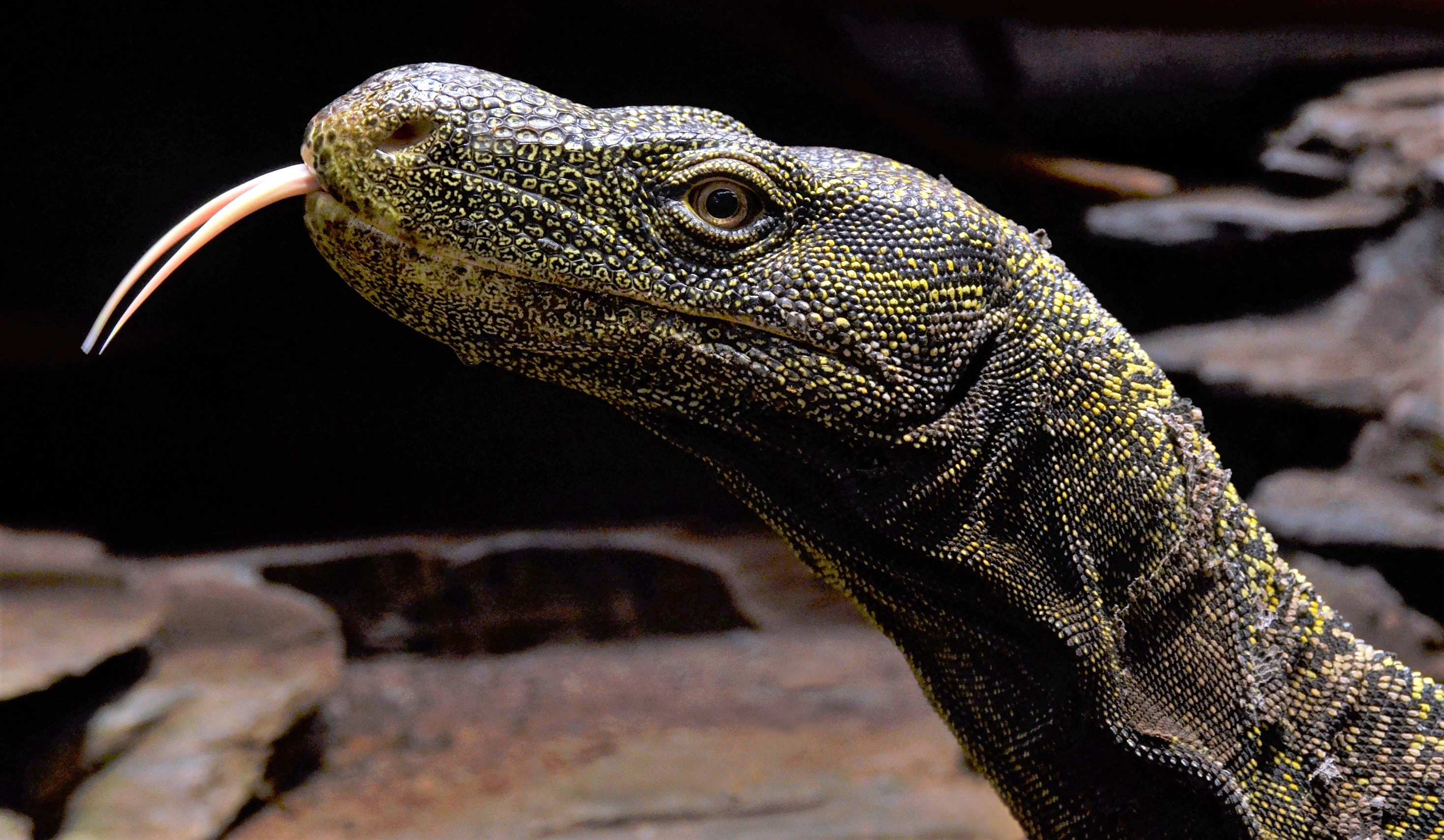
Closeup of the bulbous snout, at the Cologne Zoo

A characteristic feature of the crocodile monitor is its blunt, bulbous snout, which makes it look different from every other monitor on New Guinea, and suggested the common name "tree crocodile". The body of the lizard is dark green with rings of yellow spots. The tail is banded yellow and black and is extremely long.

Its teeth are long, straight, and sharp. Its claws are prominent and strongly curved. Males reach a considerably larger size than females in both weight and length, and also tend to have a more robust head.

=== Respiration ===
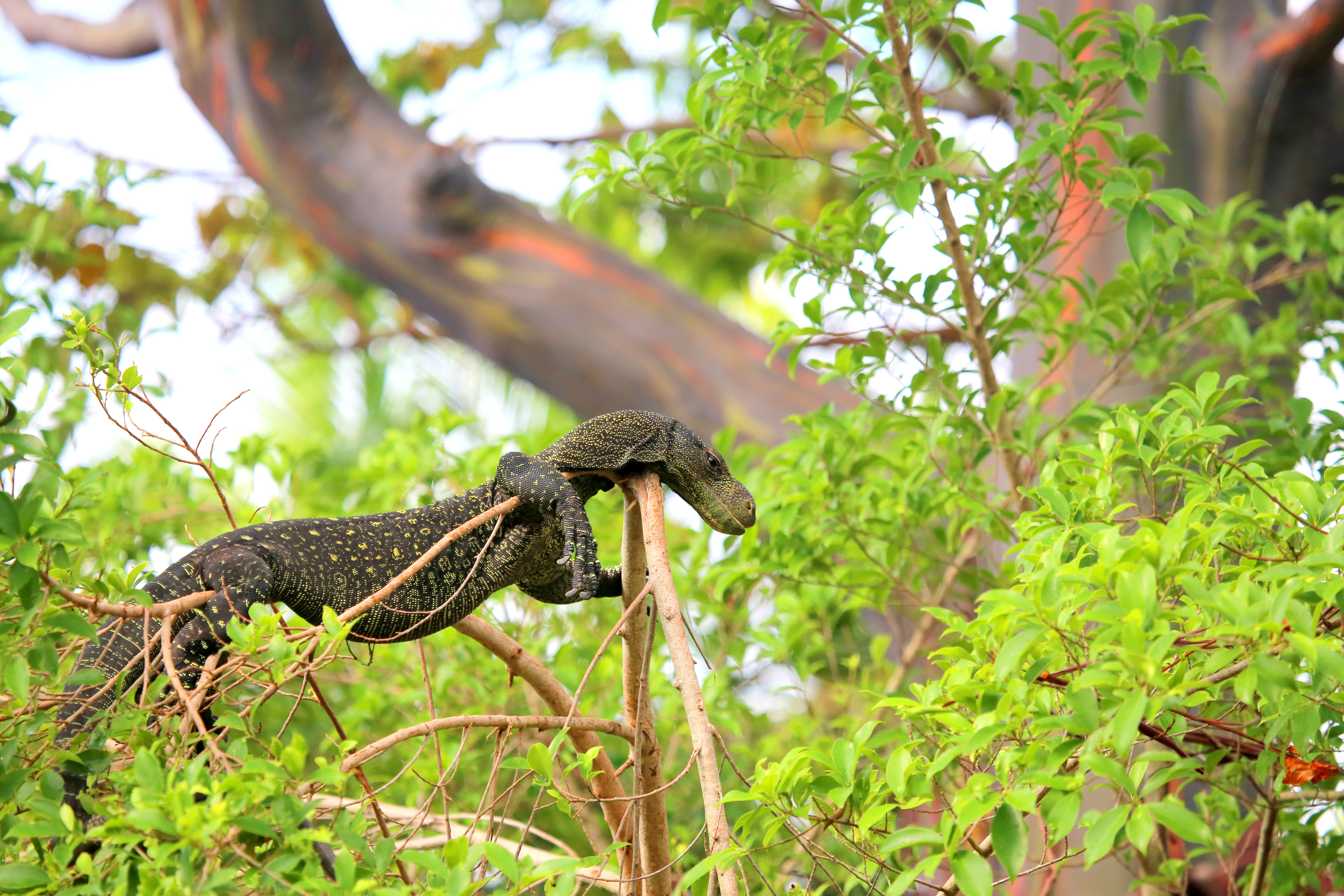
Crocodile monitor in the trees; rainbow eucalyptus in the background

Like many monitor species, the crocodile monitor has mammal-like aerobic abilities; a positive pressure gular pump in the animal's throat assists lung ventilation. Unlike most lizards that cannot breathe efficiently while running, because of Carrier's constraint, the gular pump of monitor lizards enables them to overcome the effect of one lung at a time being compressed by their running gait. The evolutionary development of the gular pump is functionally analogous to that of the diaphragm in mammals, which ventilates the lung independently of locomotion. Even amongst monitors, the crocodile monitor is one of the most agile species, quickly running up tree trunks and leaping from branch to branch. Investigation supports the idea that gular breathing is an evolutionary development that masks the effect of Carrier's constraint.

=== Size ===
The crocodile monitor's typical reported length is less than 200 cm (79 in) with a matching body mass of about 20 kg (44 lb). Such a weight is questionable for healthy individuals of this slender species, and a review of healthy captive adults found that a typical weight was up to 6 kg (13 lb). Ten specimens were found to weigh only 5 to 6.38 kg (11.0 to 14.1 lb) at a length of 1.16 to 2.25 m (3 ft 10 in to 7 ft 5 in). The average size of crocodile monitors caught in one study was 99.2 cm (39.1 in) with a weight of 2.02 kg (4.5 lb), but these must have been young specimens.

Crocodile monitors are unique among extant varanid species in that the tail is much longer than the snout-to-vent length in both juveniles and adults. The tail generally is 2–2.7 times the snout-to-vent length.

Crocodile monitors upon hatching measure about 45 cm (18 in) long and they reach maturity when about 170 cm (67 in). Reports of the maximal length vary greatly and are the subject of much dispute. It possibly attains the greatest length among extant species of lizards, although it is considerably less massive than the Komodo dragon. Crocodile monitors have been confirmed to reach up to 255 cm (100 in) in length (record by a specimen at Museum Koenig). Some have been claimed to be much larger, including an individual from Konedobu that reportedly was 323 cm (127 in) long, one from Kikori that reportedly was 427 cm (168 in) and an individual from Port Moresby that reportedly was 475 cm (187 in) long, but these sizes are unverified.

Claims of crocodile monitors attaining large weights also are unverified; the species is much more slender than Komodo dragons of comparable length.

== Behavior ==
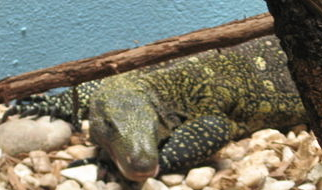
A specimen of V. salvadorii at the Oklahoma City Zoo

The crocodile monitor is a highly arboreal lizard. It can hang onto branches with its rear legs, and occasionally use its tail as a prehensile grip. The primary function of the tail, however, is as a counterbalance when leaping from branch to branch. As in some other Varanus species, the tail also may be used for defense, as captive specimens may attempt to lash keepers with their tails. This species occasionally is seen in the pet trade, but has a reputation for aggression and unpredictability. Although they are known to rest and bask in trees, they sleep on the ground or submerged in water.

These monitors rise up on their hind legs to check their surroundings, behaviour that also has been documented in Gould's monitors (V. gouldii). They are known to exhibit a warning posture, in which they carry their tails rolled up behind them. According to native belief, they give a warning call if they see crocodiles. In general crocodile monitors avoid human contact, but their bite is thought capable of causing infection, like the Komodo dragon's. However, this has largely been disproven due to the discovery that most if not all monitor lizards including the crocodile monitor and Komodo dragon are venomous. These venom glands are located in the lizard's lower jaw. One fatality was reported from a bite in 1983 when a Papuan woman was bitten and later died from an infection.

=== Diet ===
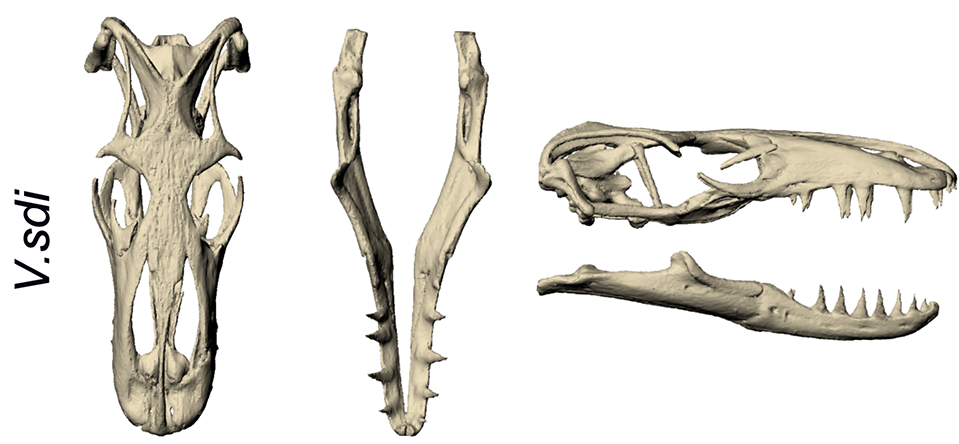
Crocodile monitor skull

The teeth of crocodile monitors do not resemble those of many other monitor species, which typically are blunt, peglike, and face slightly rearward. Their upper teeth are long, fang-like, set vertically in the jawbone, adapted to hooking into fast-moving prey such as birds, bats, and rodents. Their lower teeth are housed in a fleshy sheath. In the wild, crocodile monitors are the top predator in New Guinea, feeding on birds (such as Cacatua sp.), eggs, small mammals (such as rats and bandicoots), frogs, reptiles, and carrion. Natives have reported that it can take down pigs, deer, and hunting dogs, and hauls its prey into the canopy to consume it. Captive specimens have been known to eat fish, frogs, rodents, chickens, and dog food.

This species has been observed hunting prey in a unique fashion for monitor lizards. Rather than following its prey to ambush it from behind, the crocodile monitor may stalk its prey and anticipate where it will run, meeting it headlong.

=== Reproduction ===
Reproduction of crocodile monitors has only been observed in captivity, so nothing is known about its reproduction in the wild. The egg clutches, comprising four to 12 eggs, are deposited around October to January, with the eggs showing a difference in dimensions, a phenomenon for which no explanation is known. Dimensions vary from 7.5 cm × 3.4 cm to 10 cm × 4.5 cm (3.0 in × 1.3 in to 3.9 in × 1.8 in), while weight varies from 43.3 to 60.8 g (1.53 to 2.14 oz). Most clutches laid in captivity have been infertile, and only four successful breedings have been documented thus far. Hatchlings are about 460 mm (18 in) long and weigh around 56 g (2.0 oz). Like those of many other monitors, hatchling crocodile monitors are more colourful than adults and feed primarily on insects and small reptiles.

== Conservation ==
Varanus salvadorii is currently protected under the CITES Appendix II, which requires an exportation permit for international trade. It is not listed as a threatened species on the IUCN Red List or on the Endangered Species Act. It faces threats from deforestation and poaching, as it is hunted and skinned by native peoples, who consider the monitor an evil spirit that "climbs trees, walks upright, breathes fire, and kills men", to make drums.

In 2008, 52 individuals were maintained at 17 zoological parks in the United States, and an unknown number in private collections.
