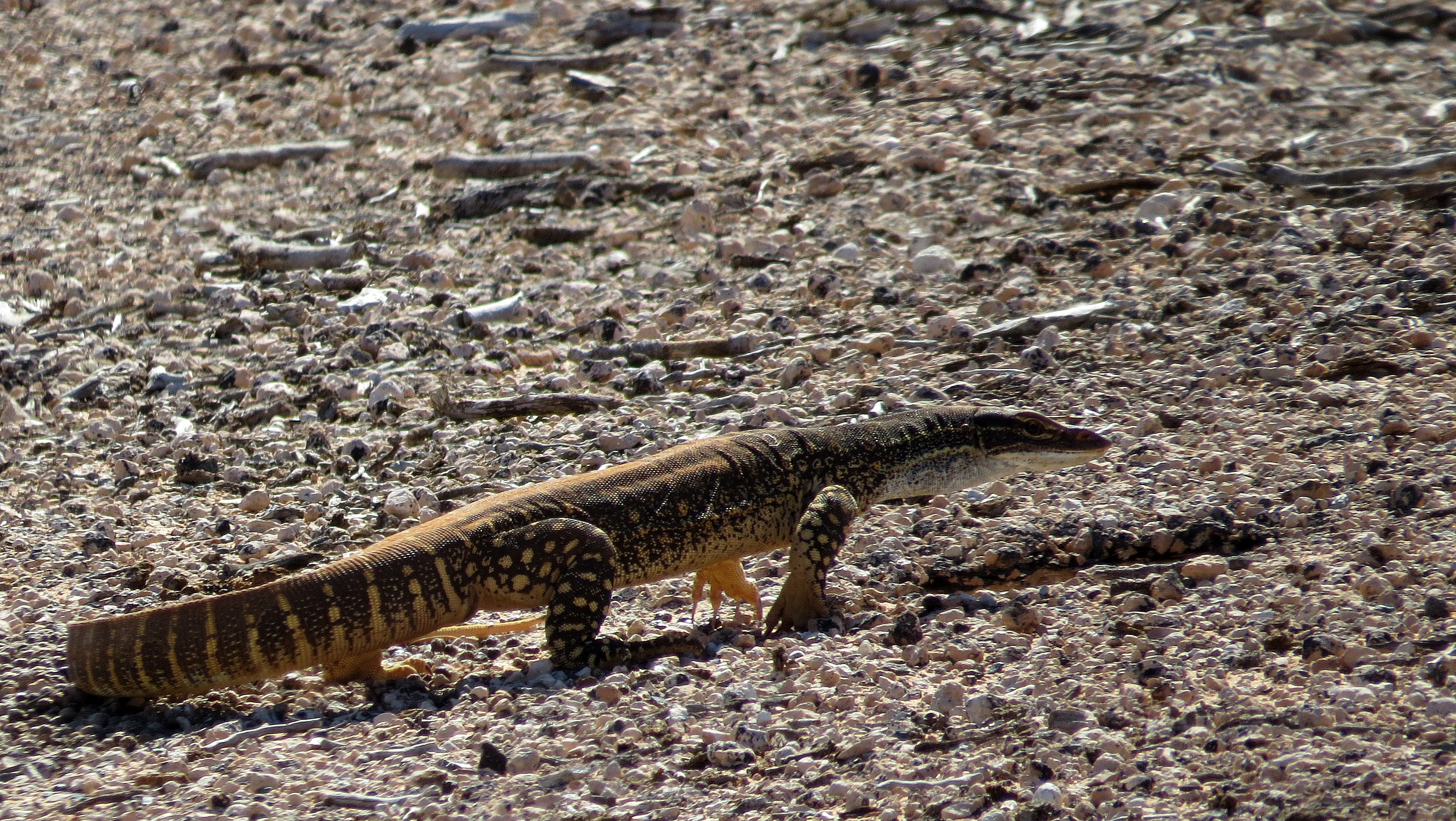
- In Mungo National Park (NSW), Australia

Conservation status
- Least Concern (IUCN 3.1)
- CITES Appendix II

Scientific classification
- Kingdom: Animalia
- Phylum: Chordata
- Class: Reptilia
- Order: Squamata
- Suborder: Anguimorpha
- Family: Varanidae
- Genus: Varanus
- Subgenus: Varanus
- Species: V. gouldii

Binomial name
- Varanus gouldii (Gray, 1838)
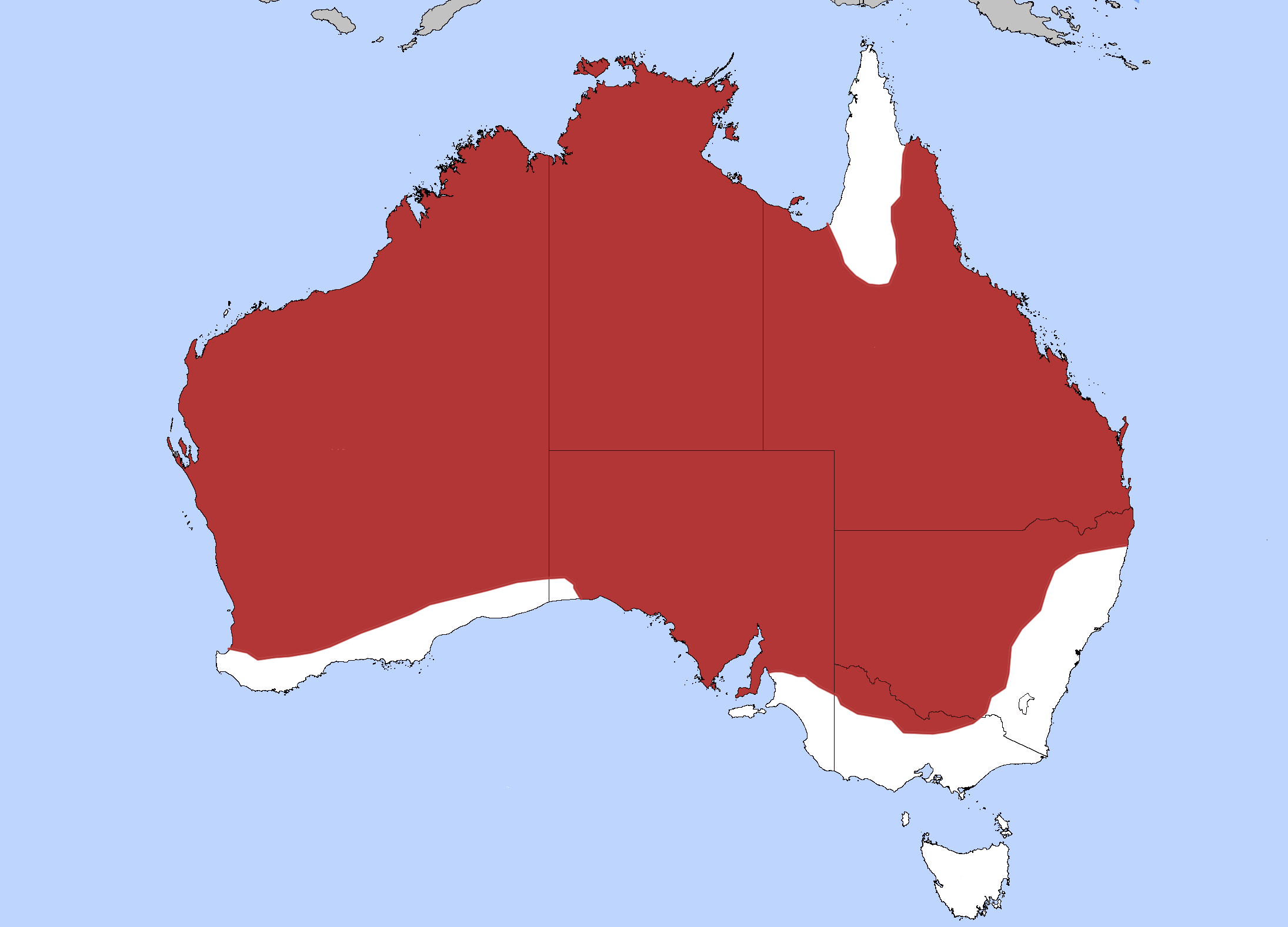
- Distribution of the sand goanna

Synonyms
- Hydrosaurus gouldii Gray, 1838; Monitor gouldii — Schlegel, 1839; Varanus gouldii — A.M.C. Duméril & A.H.A. Duméril, 1851

= Sand goanna =

Species of lizard

The sand goanna (Varanus gouldii), also known commonly as Gould's monitor, the racehorse goanna, and the sand monitor, is a species of large Australian monitor lizard in the family Varanidae.

== Taxonomy ==
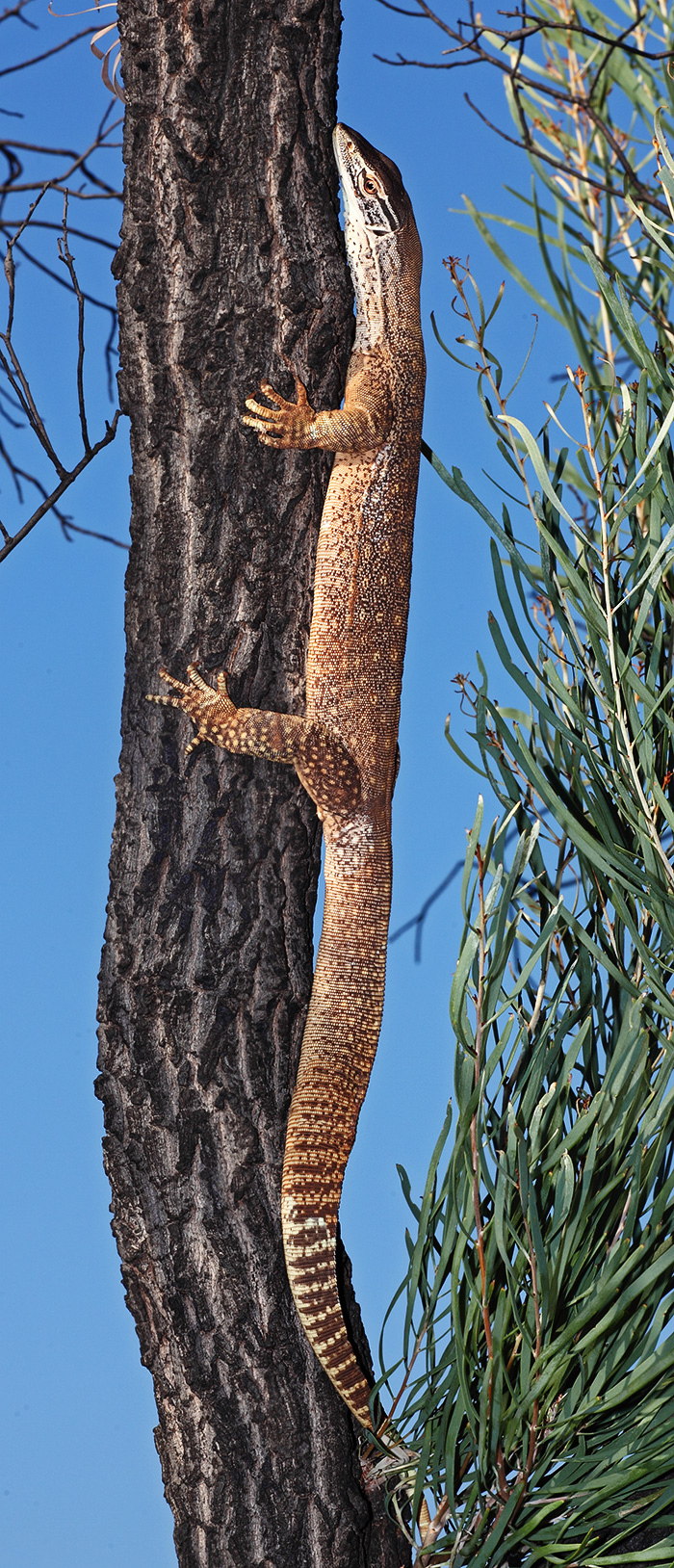
Climbing a tree, Northern Territory

John Edward Gray described the species in 1838 as Hydrosaurus gouldii, noting the source of the type specimen as "New Holland" and distinguishing the new varanid by "two yellow streaks on the sides of the neck" and small flat scales at the orbits.

An earlier description, Tupinambis endrachtensis Péron, F. 1807, was determined as likely to refer to this animal, but the epithet gouldii was conserved and a new specimen designated as the type. This neotype was obtained in 1997 at the near coastal Western Australian suburb of Karrakatta, and placed with the British Museum of Natural History. The decision of a nomenclatural commission (ICZN) was to issue an opinion suppressing the earlier name Tupinambis endrachtensis and the name Hydrosaurus ocellarius Blyth, 1868, that were unsatisfactory to some who had commented on the case, but provided taxonomic certainty for future revisions of the associated taxa.

=== Etymology ===
The specific name, gouldii, is assumed to be a Latinised form of the surname of an associate of the describing author, English ornithologist John Gould, who was actively assembling specimens of fauna from Australia, but is not thought to have any direct connection to this species.

The Yuwaalaraay people of northern New South Wales know this species by the name biiwii. In some Aboriginal languages, the sand goanna is called bungarra, a term also commonly used by non-Aboriginal people in Western Australia. In Pitjantjatjara and other central Australian languages, it is called tingka.

=== Subspecies ===
Two subspecies are recognised:

- V. g. gouldii (Schlegel, 1837) – Gould's goanna
- V. g. flavirufus Mertens, 1958 – desert sand monitor

Nota bene: A trinomial authority in parentheses indicates that the subspecies was originally described in a genus other than Varanus.

=== Taxonomic history ===
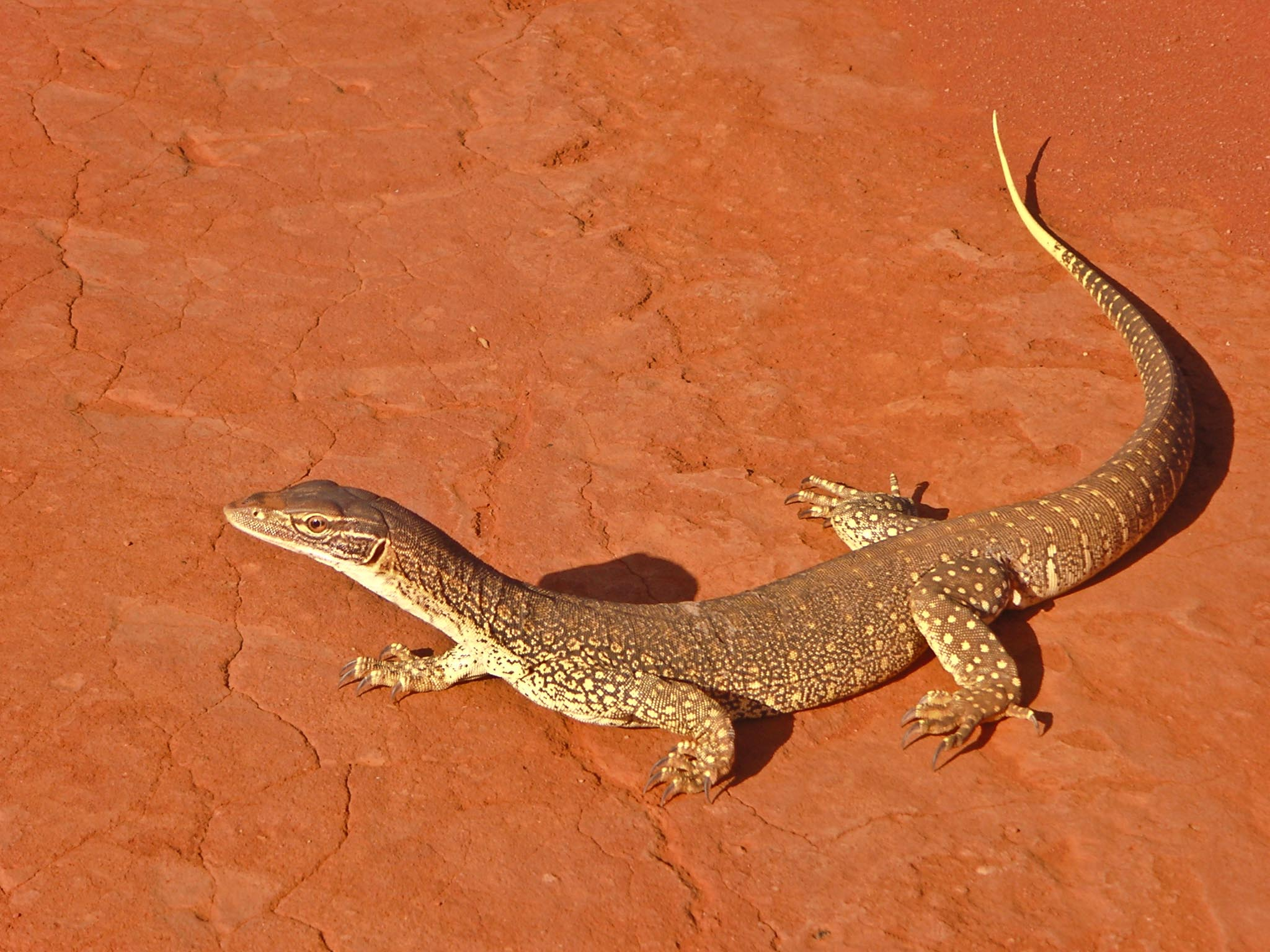
In Eromanga, Queensland

The sand goanna is placed in the genus Varanus, the monitors and goannas. Due to the taxonomic uncertainty during the 20th century, the species' form and behaviour have included taxa later recognised as distinct species, such as V. rosenbergi, formerly treated as a subspecies and later elevated, and V. panoptes, described as a new species in 1980 and resolved as a legitimate publication in 2000.

== Biology ==
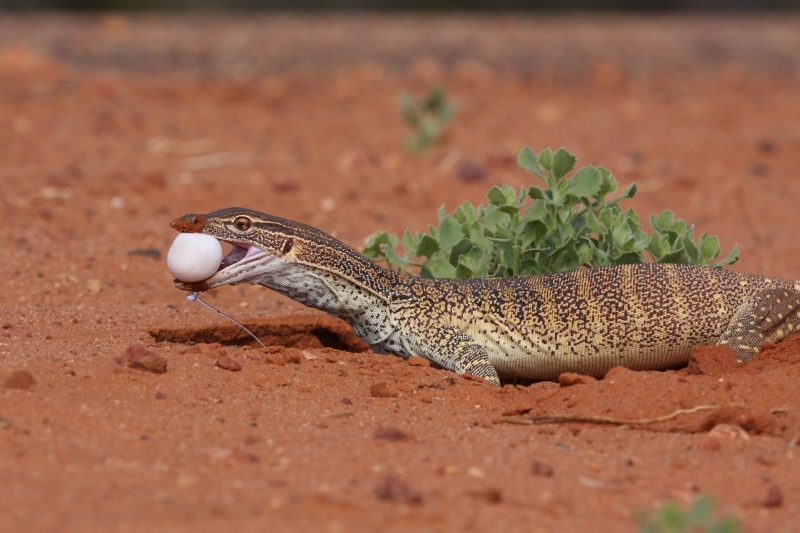
Eating eggs, in Windorah, Queensland

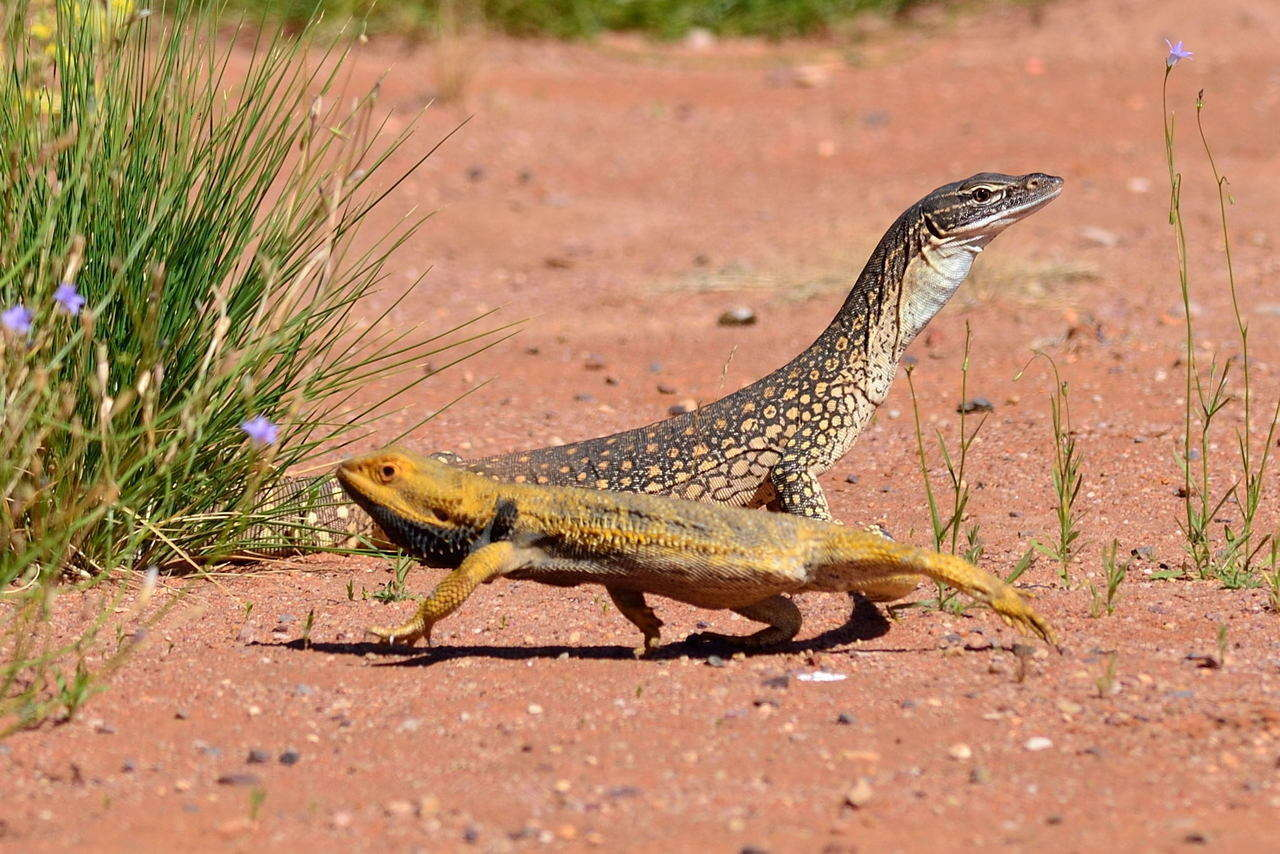
With a central bearded dragon, in South Australia

Gould's monitor is a terrestrial reptile that excavates large burrows for shelter. Rock escarpments and tree hollows are also suitable dwellings. It inhabits a vast range throughout Australia, reaching an average length of 140 cm (4.6 ft) and weighing as much as 6 kg (13 lb). It can be found in northern and eastern Australia, where it inhabits open woodlands and grasslands. V. g. flavirufus, a slightly smaller subspecies, resides in Australia's interior. In some places, however, the ranges of Gould's monitor, V. g. flavirufus and the Argus monitor overlap. The similarities between the species and their close proximity frequently cause confusion.

The sand monitor is a relentless forager. It is diurnal, meaning most of its activities take place during the day. Anything smaller than itself is devoured eagerly. The diets of hatchlings and juveniles often consist mostly of insects and small lizards, but generally varies more with age. Adult monitors prey on mice, other small mammals, small birds, crustaceans, scorpions, large insects, small lizard species, snakes, amphibians, eggs, and carrion. They have also been seen to congregate around fish kills. They are seemingly immune to snake venom and kill and eat even the most venomous species such as the inland taipan. The sand goanna does consume smaller species of monitors, ackies, rock monitors, and other dwarf species are often found and eaten. Gould's monitor commonly are seen disturbing rock piles in an attempt to flush out any Odatria. Females lay eggs in termite mounds to protect them from the harsh desert climate.

Like all goannas and snakes, the sand monitor has a forked tongue, with which it "tastes" the air. Scents are picked up on each side of the fork, which when retracted, brushes over an area in the mouth called the Jacobson's organ, which identifies on which side the scent is stronger. Upon identifying this difference, the sand monitor can alter its direction accordingly. A 2021 study had shown that during the Miocene, Komodo dragons had hybridized with the common ancestor of V. gouldii, V. rosenbergi, V. panoptes, and V. spenceri, thus providing evidence that the Komodo dragon had once inhabited Australia.

== Gallery ==
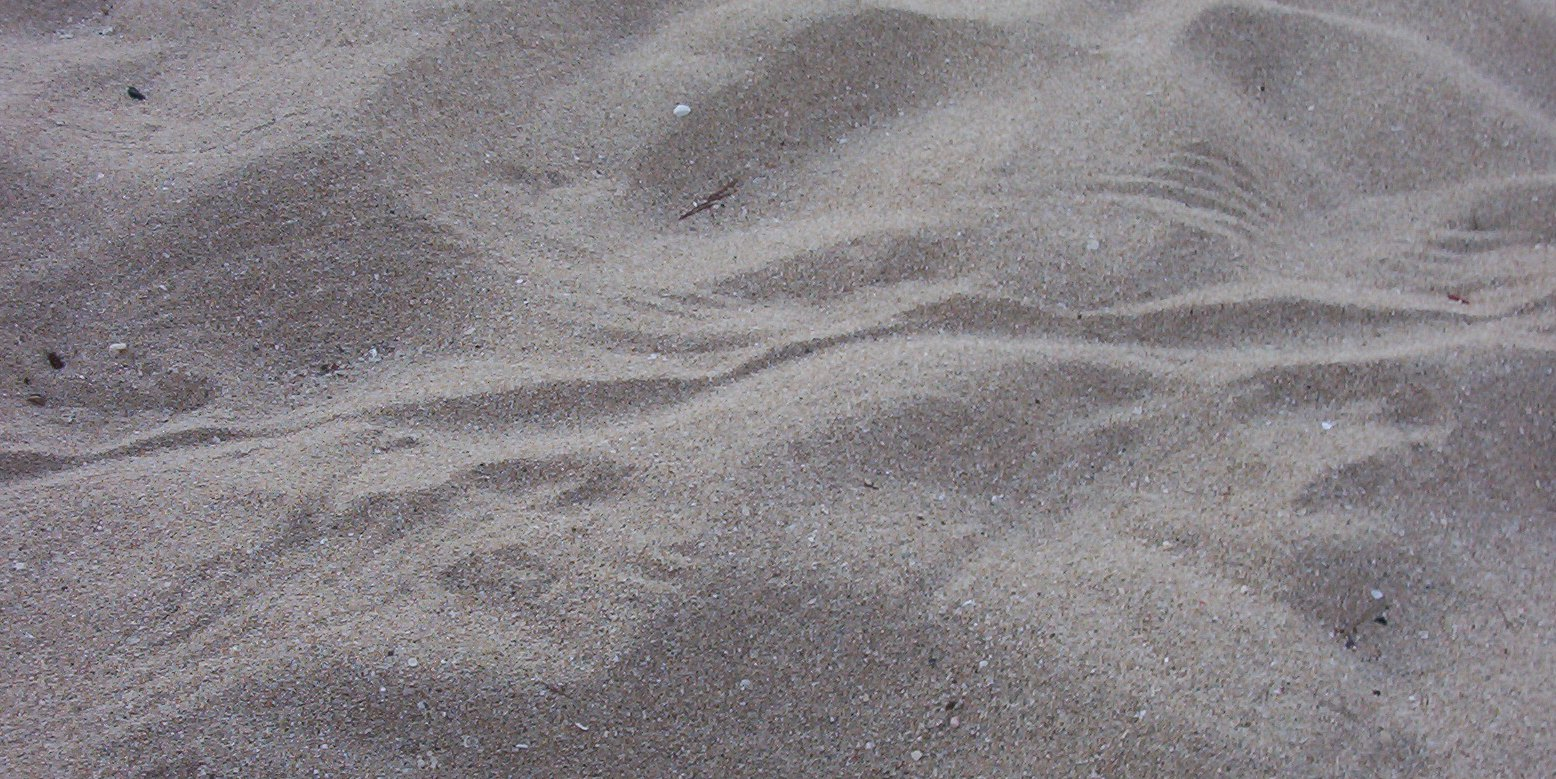
Sand monitor walking tracks in sand.

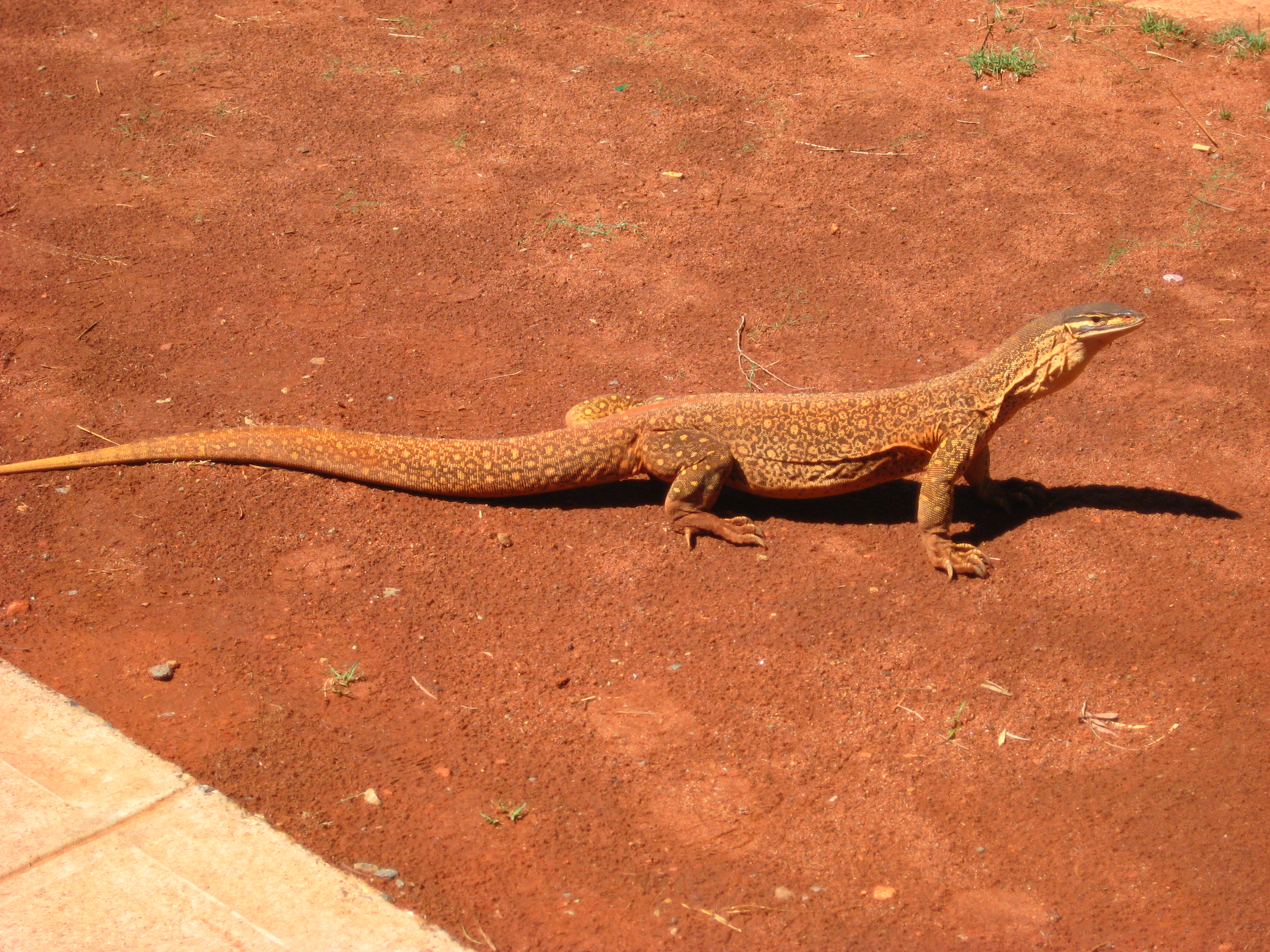
At the Sunrise Dam Gold Mine (WA).

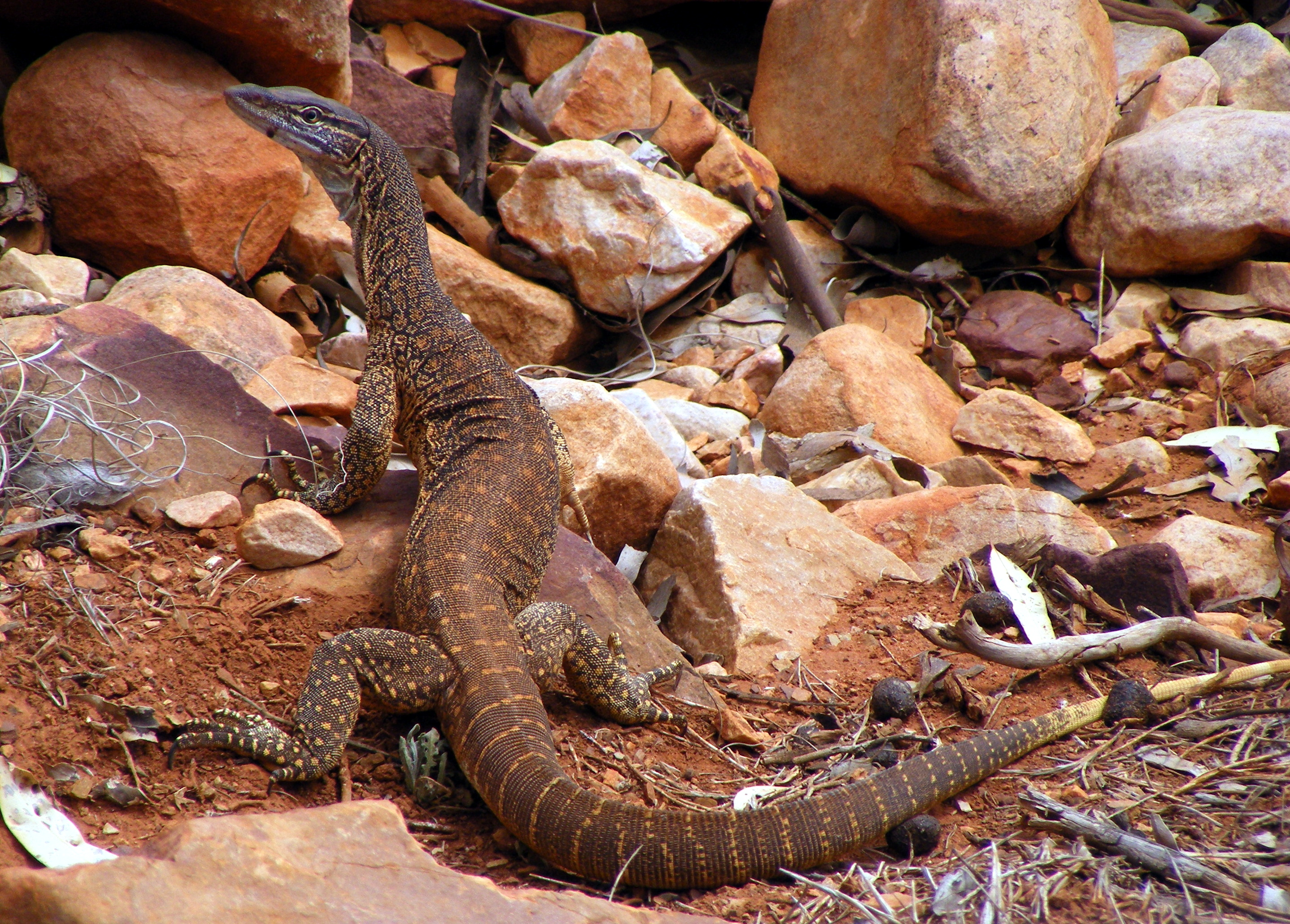
At Wilpena Pound (SA)

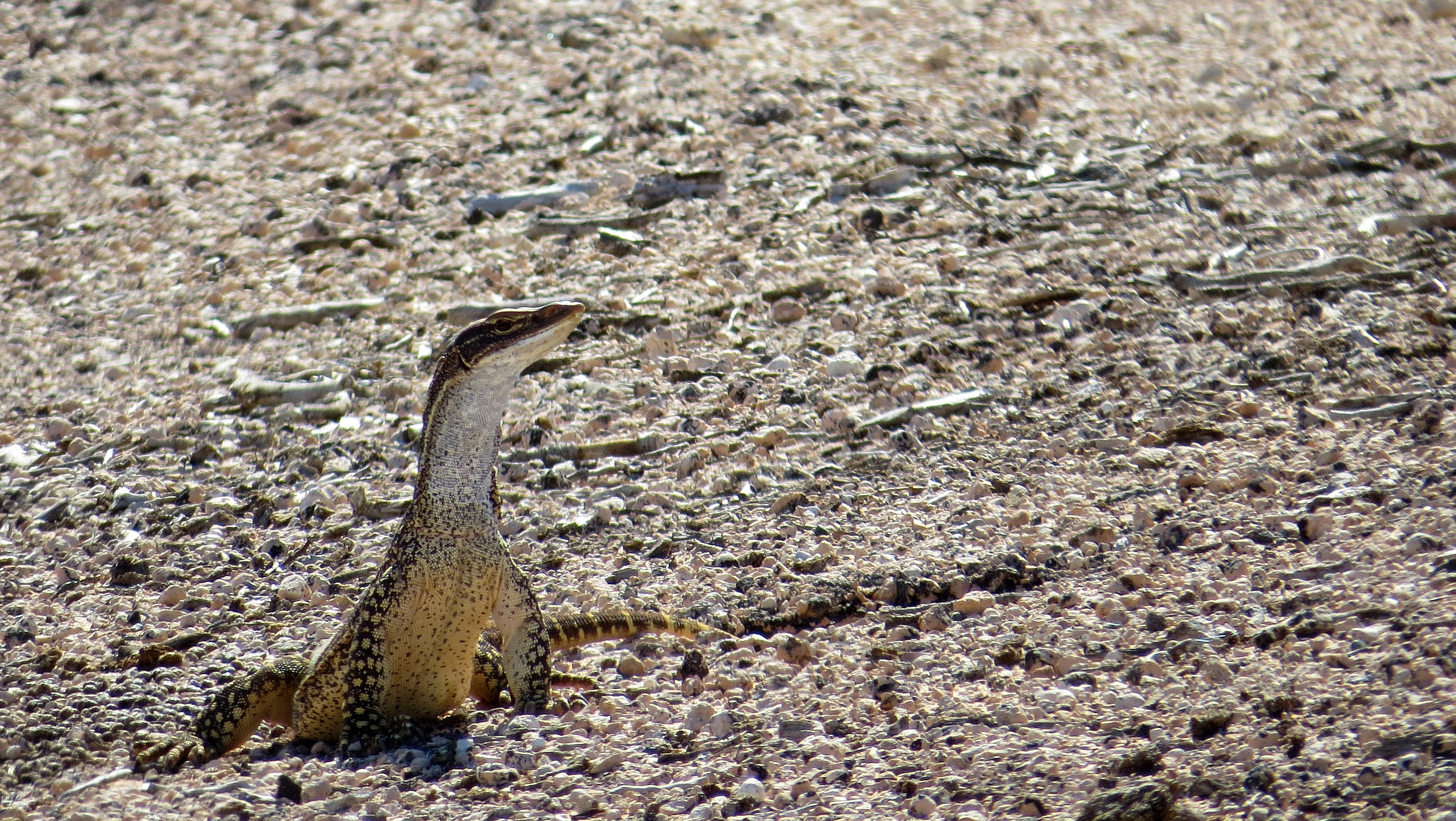
Mungo National Park (NSW)

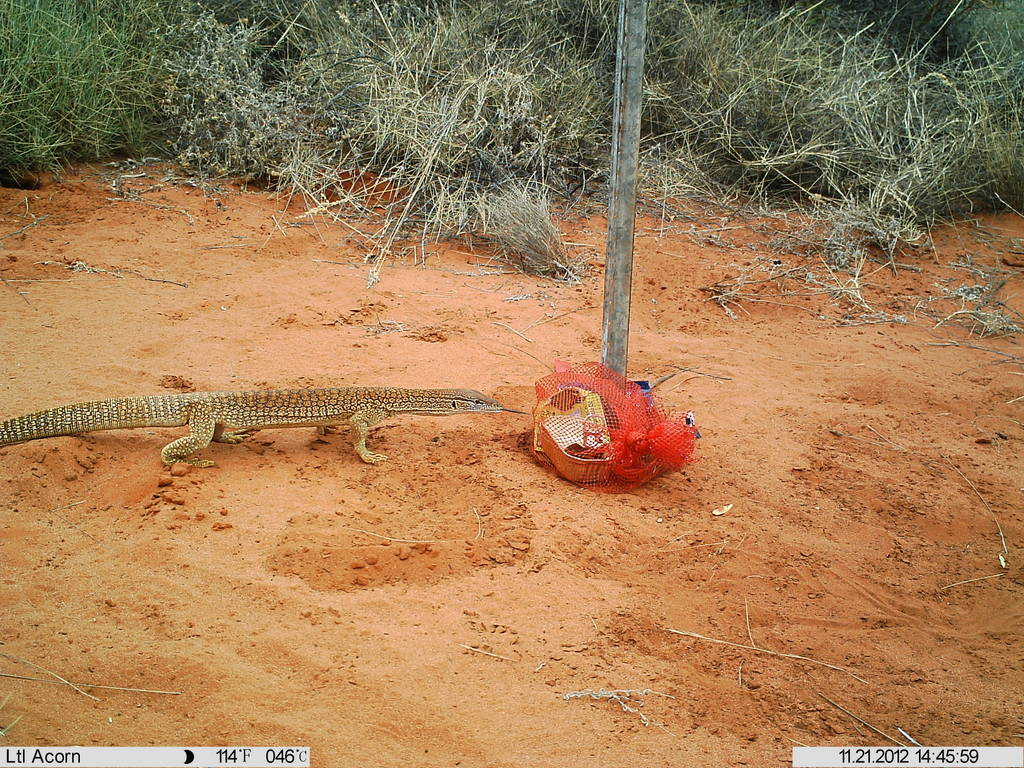
At a camera lure, Angas Downs IPA (NT)

== General sources ==
- Bush, Brian; Maryan, Brad; Browne-Cooper, Robert; Robinson, David (1995). A Guide to the Reptiles and Frogs of the Perth Region. Nedlands: UWA Press. ISBN 1-875560-42-4. 226 pp.
- Cogger, H. (1967). Australian Reptiles in Colour. Sydney: A. H. & A. W. Reed. ISBN 0-589-07012-6.
- King, Dennis; Green, Brian (1999). Goannas: The Biology of Varanid Lizards. University of New South Wales Press. ISBN 0-86840-456-X.
- Thompson, G. G. (1995). "Foraging patterns and behaviours, body postures and movement speed for goannas, Varanus gouldii (Reptilia: Varanidae), in a semi-urban environment" (PDF). Journal of the Royal Society of Western Australia. 78 (4): 107–114.
