= Baldwin Spencer Building =

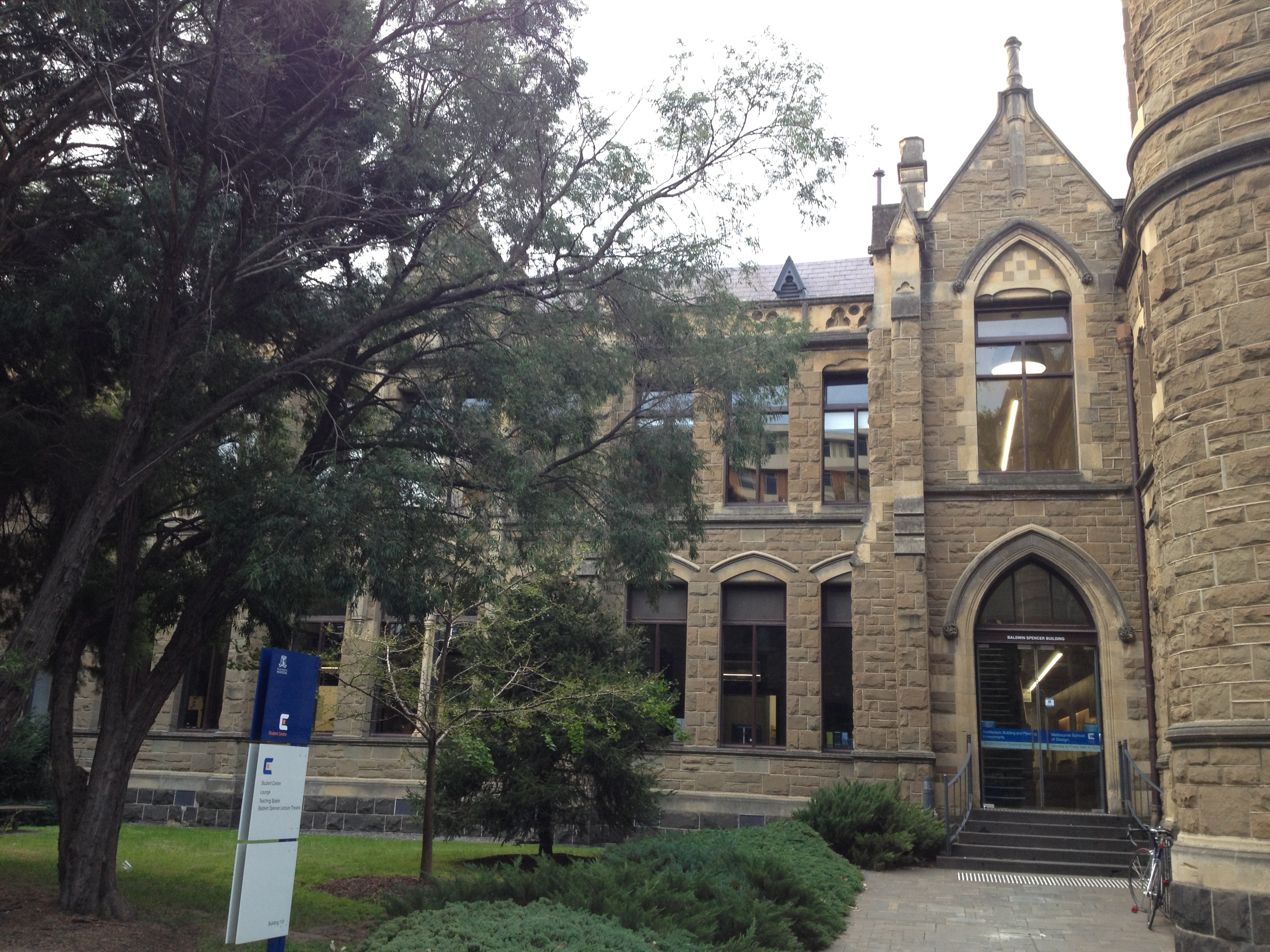
- Baldwin Spencer Building entrance, April 2013
- Alternative names: Old Zoology Building; Building 113
- Etymology: Walter Baldwin Spencer (inaugural Professor of Biology)

General information
- Status: Completed
- Type: Academic administration
- Architectural style: Collegiate Gothic style; Victorian Academic Gothic
- Location: 152-292 Grattan Street, The University of Melbourne, Parkville Campus, Melbourne, Victoria, Australia
- Coordinates: 37°47′48″S 144°57′43″E
- Construction started: 1887
- Opened: 1888 (as the Biology Building)
- Owner: The University of Melbourne

Technical details
- Material: Brick; Rough-hewn freestone coursed walls
- Floor count: 2

Design and construction
- Architects: Joseph Reed, Anketell Henderson and Francis Smart (1887–1890)
- Architecture firm: Reed Henderson and Smart (1887–1890); Smart Tappin and Peebles (1905–1906); Mockridge Stahle and Mitchell (west wing, 1963); Woods Bagot (2011)

Victorian Heritage Register
- Official name: Baldwin Spencer Building (Old Zoology)
- Type: State heritage (built)
- Designated: 24 June 1992
- Reference no.: 913
- Significance: Registered
- Category: Education

The Baldwin Spencer Building, also called Building 113, is a university teaching facility that serves as a student service centre, located at 152-292 Grattan Street, The University of Melbourne, Parkville Campus, Melbourne, Victoria, Australia.

Built between 1887 and 1888, the building was initially called the Biology Building. In 1920, the School of Biology was renamed the School of Zoology, and the building was renamed in honour of Sir Baldwin Spencer, the university's first professor of biology. Spencer submitted designs for the building that were finalised by architects, Joseph Reed, Anketell Henderson and Francis Smart, who formed a partnership known as Reed Henderson and Smart. The building is completed in the Gothic Revival architectural style with distinctive elements such as rough-hewn freestone coursed walls that can be compared with similar designs by the same architects for nearby buildings such as Ormond College and the earlier Old Pathology Building. The Baldwin Spencer Building was listed on the Victorian Heritage Register on 24 June 1992.

== Description ==
The design intent of the original building portrays the identified requirements of Walter Baldwin Spencer for natural light and ventilation to enter a space containing the biology research department involving microscopic and dissecting work.

The original building contained a lecture theatre which can seat two hundred students, well-lit laboratories, a museum for teaching purposes and store rooms. The lecture theatre contained a large skylight roof as well as acoustic and ventilation systems. The laboratories provided two feet of window space for every five feet of bench, and located at the rear of the building was a greenhouse, maceration room, pond and animal compounds. The building contains many interiors that are still intact from the 1890s, with many original elements of architecture such as the staircases; specifically the staircase within the conical roofed turret, the ceiling of the library with cast-iron columns and crocket capitals, initial laboratory spaces and equipment, as well as the steeply tiered lecture theatre complete with wooden seating and desks. These elements give a vivid impression of the architectural style of that period in time.

Externally, both the Biology and Old Pathology Buildings were situated towards the large ornamental lake which is now paved over and grassed as Union Lawn. In 1889, additional rooms were added including lecture spaces and also later in 1905, two workshops were added to the building that were designed by the original architects Reed Henderson and Smart (later known as Smart, Tappin and Peebles in 1906). The Baldwin Spencer Building is constructed in stone and brick, which is styled in a type of the Early English Gothic.

The key architectural elements include the heavily rusticated freestone walls, buttresses, a conical roofed round turret with spiral stair, dressed stone arched window heads, drip moulds and a parapet decorated with trefoils. Internally the original theatre, laboratory and staircases are still retained; one of the laboratories still contains its original slate benches. In the library, the ceiling is panelled timber with chamfered beams and decorated cast-iron vents.

In 2011 the building was converted from a teaching and learning space to serve as an information, resource and learning centre for students of design and environment studies. The redevelopment, designed by Woods Bagot, provided for a student service centre and student lounges on the ground floor; with individual and group learning spaces on the upper level. The original 1888 lecture theatre was retained.

== Historical significance ==
The Baldwin Spencer Building is significant for its connection to Walter Spencer, who introduced many of the successive additions early into the next century, these of which included a greenhouse and aquaria. Architecturally the building is significant in demonstrating the intricacies of the Gothic Revival style, as well as demonstrating the university's preference for this style to a number of its buildings. Historically this building is significant for showing the new era of science teaching and original research that revolutionised educational policy in Victoria during the late nineteenth century.

== Gallery ==
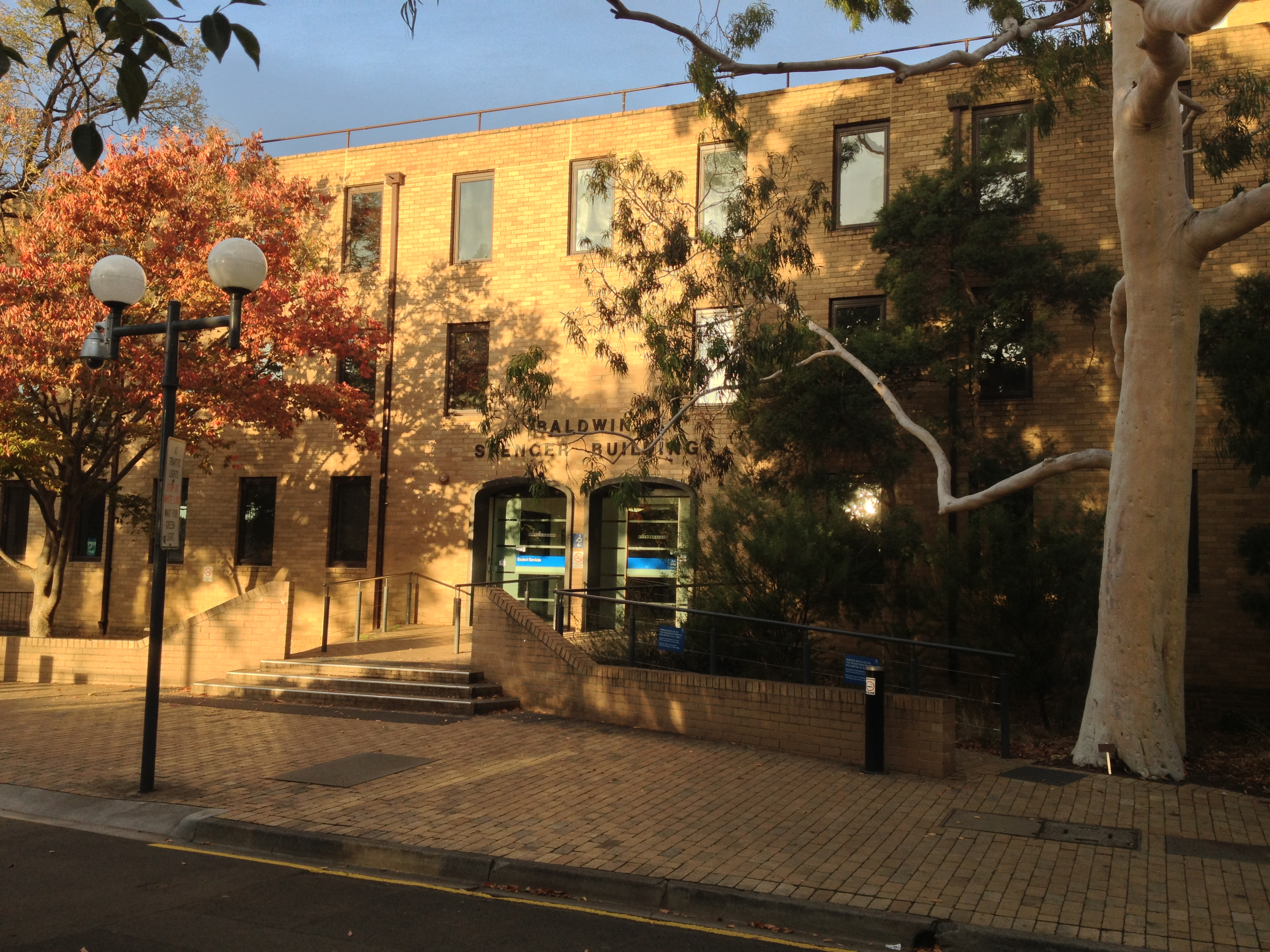
1963 west wing extension of the Baldwin Spencer Building

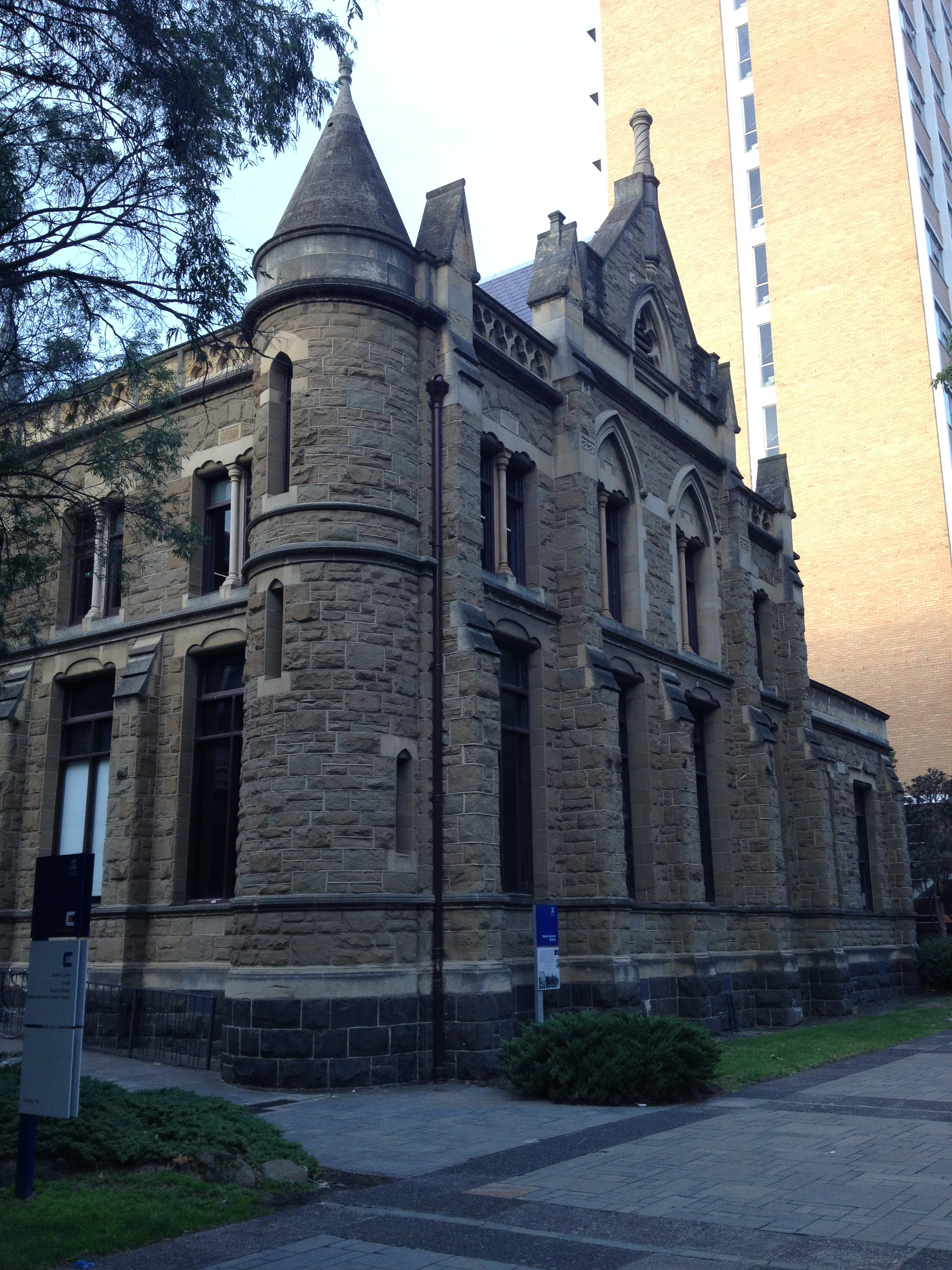
Gothic Revival-styled freestone coursed walls

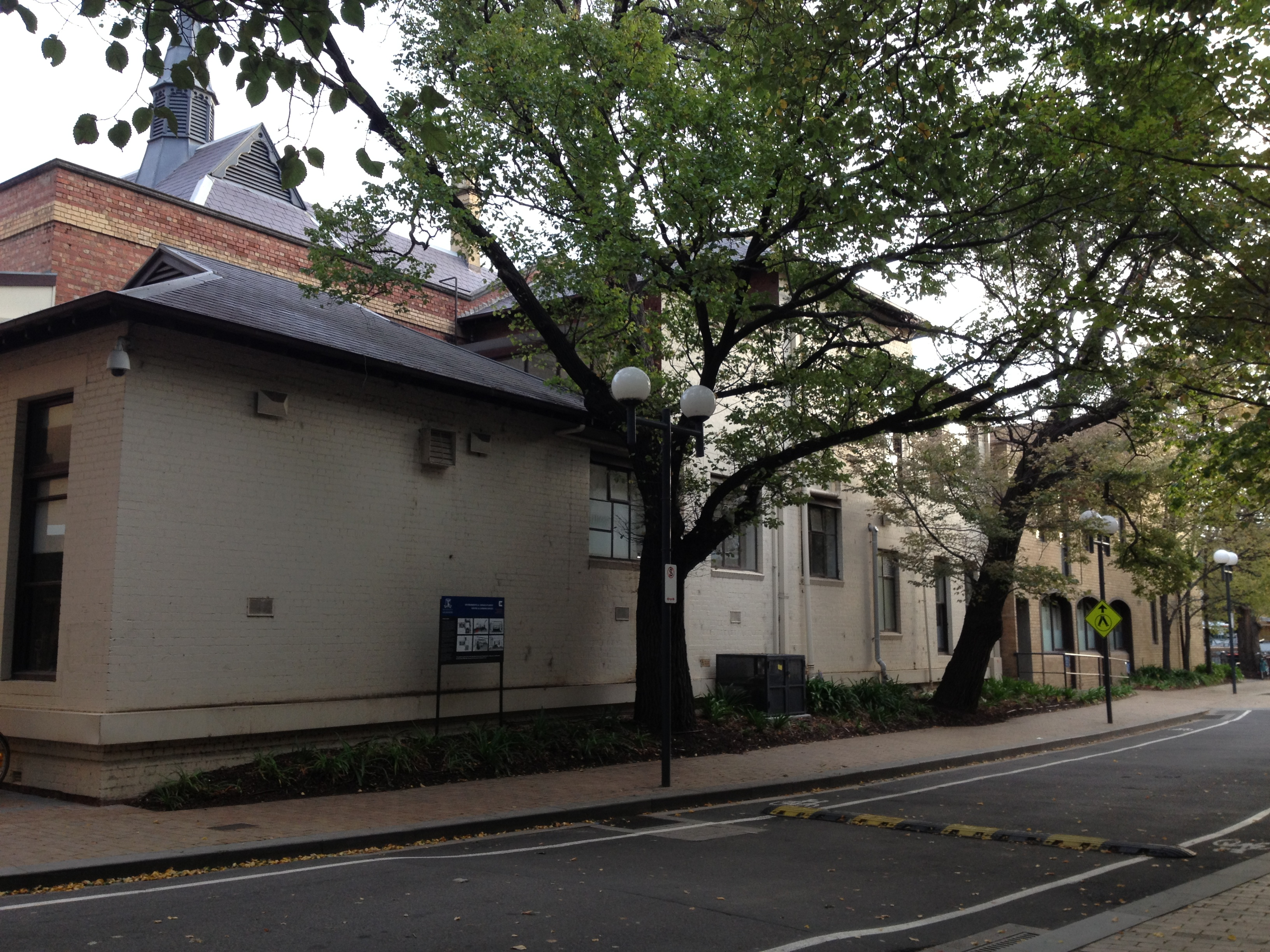
Extensions to the Baldwin Spencer Building

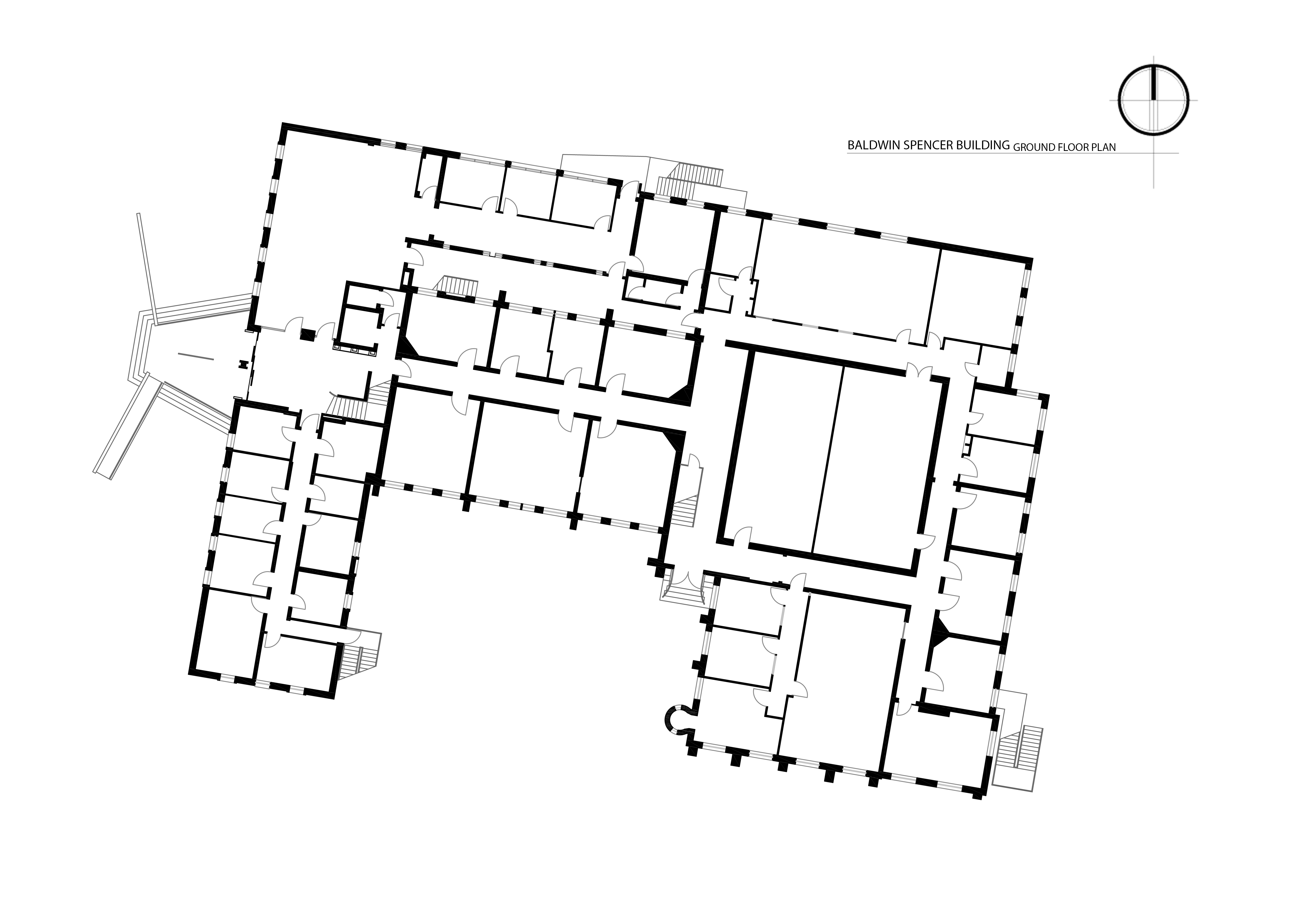
Ground floor plan

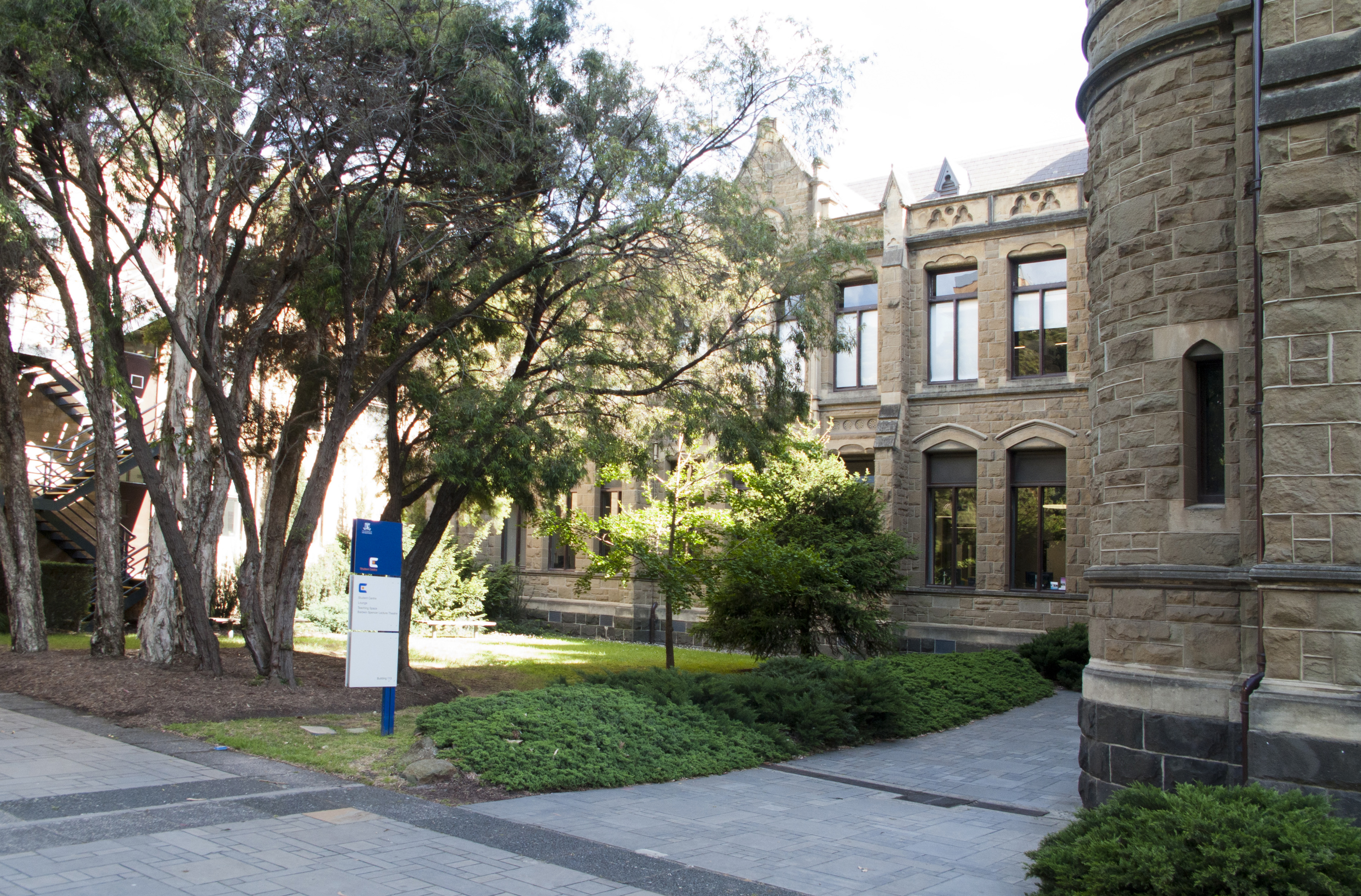
Gothic Revival-styled elements of the building's facade
