= Pseudemoia baudini =

Conservation status
- Least Concern (IUCN 3.1)

Scientific classification
- Kingdom: Animalia
- Phylum: Chordata
- Class: Reptilia
- Order: Squamata
- Family: Scincidae
- Genus: Pseudemoia
- Species: P. baudini

Binomial name
- Pseudemoia baudini (Greer, 1982)
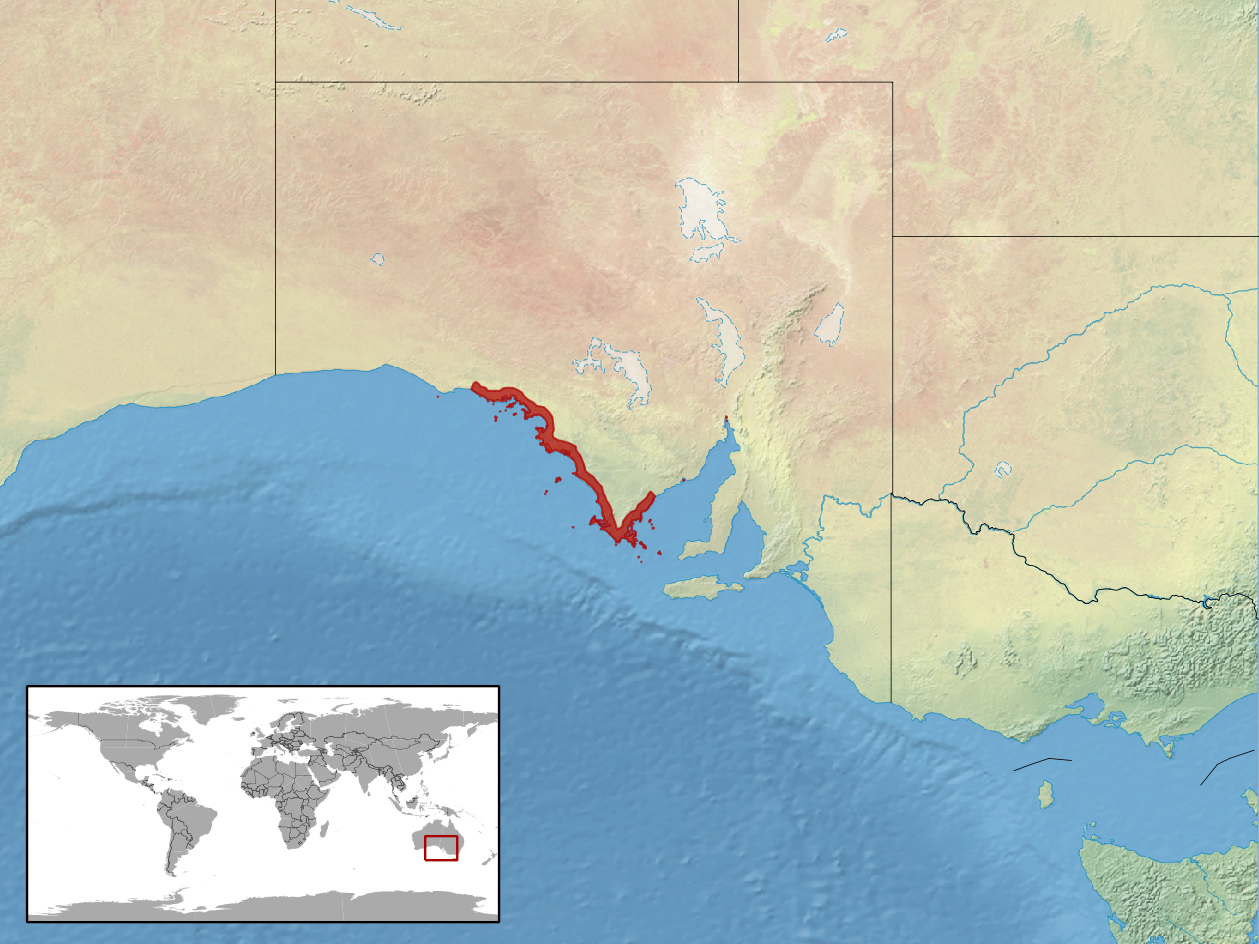

Synonyms
- Leiolopisma baudini Greer, 1982; Claireascincus baudini — Wells & Wellington, 1985; Pseudemoia baudini — Hutchinson et al., 1990

Species of lizard

Pseudemoia baudini, also known commonly as Baudin's skink, Baudin's window-eyed skink, and the Bight Coast skink, is a species of lizard in the family Scincidae. The species is endemic to Australia.

== Etymology ==
The specific name, baudini, is in honor of French explorer Nicolas Baudin.

== Geographic range ==
P. baudini is found in the Australian states of South Australia and Western Australia.

== Habitat ==
The preferred natural habitat of P. baudini is shrubland.

== Description ==
P. baudini has paired frontoparietal scales.

== Reproduction ==
P. baudini is viviparous.
