= Walter Baldwin Spencer =

British-Australian biologist (1860–1929)

Sir Baldwin Spencer KCMG FRS
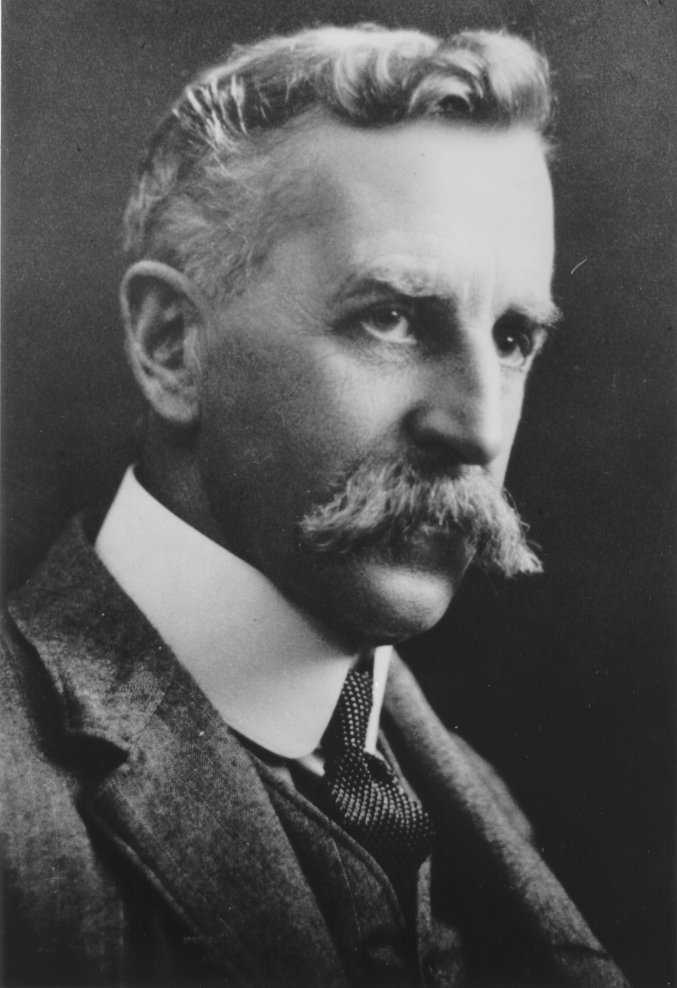
- Born: 23 June 1860; Stretford, Lancashire, England
- Died: 14 July 1929 (aged 69); Hoste Island, Chile
- Education: Owens College (University of Manchester); Exeter College, Oxford
- Awards: Clarke Medal (1923)
- Scientific career
- Fields: Anthropologist
- Workplaces: University of Melbourne; Lincoln College, Oxford
- Author abbrev. (zoology): Spencer

Sir Walter Baldwin Spencer KCMG FRS (23 June 1860 – 14 July 1929), commonly referred to as Sir Baldwin Spencer, was a British-Australian evolutionary biologist, anthropologist and ethnologist. He is known for his fieldwork with Aboriginal peoples in Central Australia, contributions to the study of ethnography, and academic collaborations with Frank Gillen. Spencer introduced the study of zoology at the University of Melbourne and held the title of Emeritus Professor until his death in 1929. He was elected a Fellow of the Royal Society in 1900 and knighted in 1916.

== Early life and education ==
Spencer was born on 23 June 1860 in Stretford, Lancashire, England to Martha (née Circuit) and Rueben Spencer. He was educated at Old Trafford school and Manchester School of Art, where he received training in drawing.

In 1879, Spencer began study at Owens College (University of Manchester), where he first developed an interest in evolutionary biology. In 1884, he obtained a BA in biology from the University of Oxford, with first-class honours. Through his time at Oxford, Spencer attended lectures by anthropologist Edward Burnett Tylor, which began a lifelong interest in the field.

As a graduate, Spencer worked as a teaching assistant to his former professor Henry Nottidge Moseley, where he aided in the transferral of General Pitt-Rivers' collection of anthropological artefacts from the South Kensington Museum to Oxford University, which had built a museum to house it. He obtained a fellowship at Lincoln College, Oxford in 1886.

== Career ==
=== Expeditions and museum work ===
While Spencer was elected president of the Arts and Crafts Society of Victoria from 1 June 1914, and there advocated for the study of aboriginal art, D. J. Mulvaney considers him "a kindly humanitarian in practice, [who] in theory ... saw Aboriginal people simply as dehumanised 'survivals' from an early stage of social development" and that while his records are invaluable, he nonetheless made "unacceptable value judgements" on indigenous Australians.

Spencer was recruited as science writer for the Australasian by its editor, David Watterston. They were assisted with their work by the artist and interpreter known to Europeans as Jim Kite, Erlikilyika, who lived at Charlotte Waters telegraph station, where Gillen had previously spent some years. Patrick ("Pado") Byrne, telegraph master at Charlotte Waters, corresponded with Spencer for many years and collected biological specimens. Spencer named a small marsupial known locally as the kowari in recognition of Byrne's contribution as Dasyuroides byrnei.

Spencer was President of the Melbourne University Sports Union and later was the President of the Victorian Football League from 1919 to 1925.

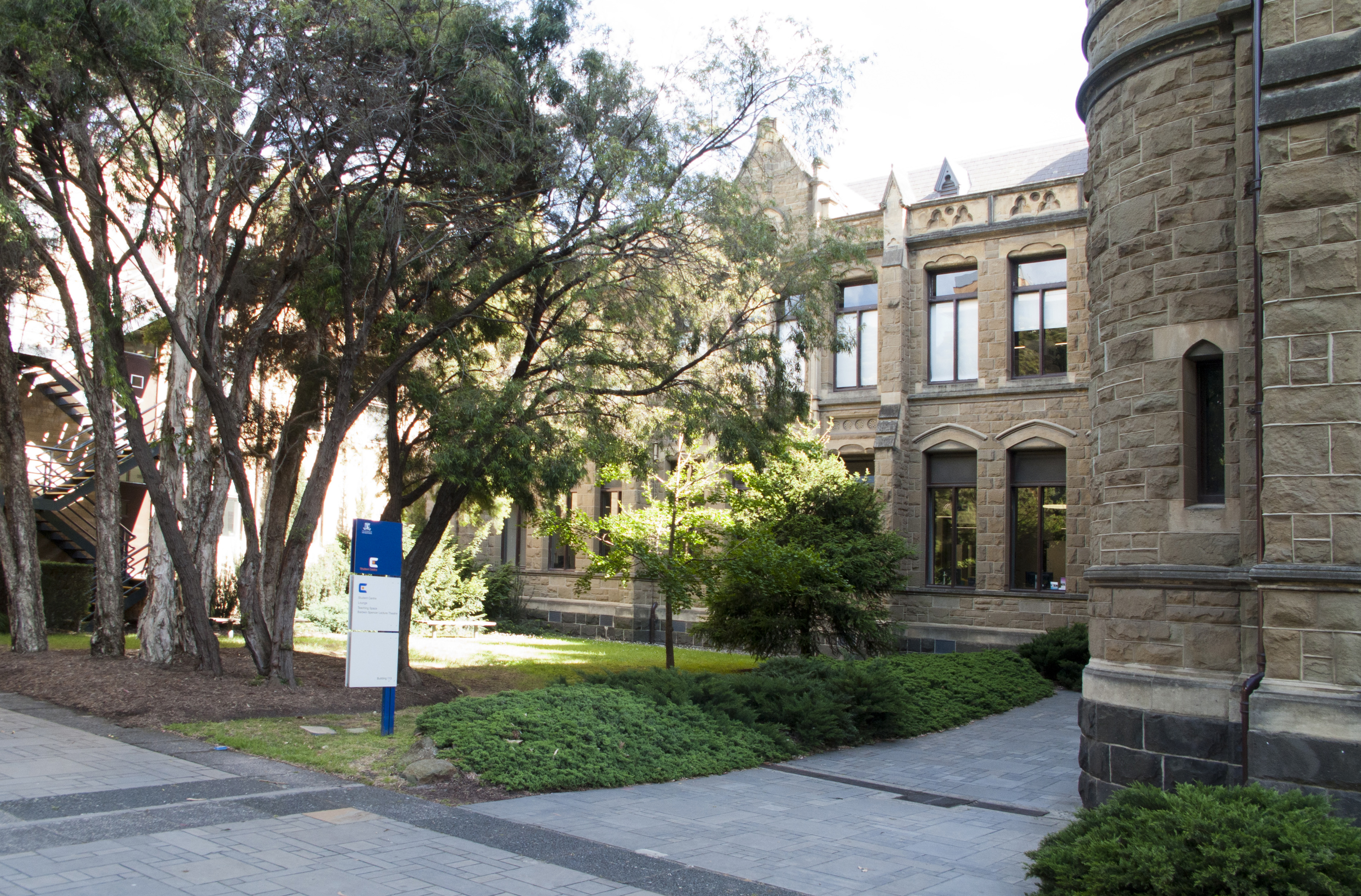
The Baldwin Spencer Building at the University of Melbourne

Spencer was awarded the Clarke Medal in 1923.

=== Clashes with Carl Strehlow ===
Spencer held very different views on the Aranda people (now often referred to as Arrernte) from missionary Carl Strehlow. Spencer's more pessimistic view saw decline, while Strehlow saw creativity and a future for them. Strehlow's son, Ted Strehlow, mentions this in his book Songs of Central Australia (1971), defending his father from Spencer's criticism. He shows that Spencer and Gillen were limited by their lack of language competence when extracting information from Indigenous peoples, whereas his father was a fluent speaker and writer of the local languages. Spencer and Gillen famously described the Aranda as "naked savages... chanting songs of which they do not know the meaning" in The Northern Tribes of Central Australia (1904).

A controversy arose in anthropological circles, after Spencer wrote "angry and to some degree defamatory letters" to Andrew Lang and Sir James Frazer about Strehlow's work. Strehlow's book, Die Aranda- und Loritja-Stämme in Zentral-Australien (published in parts, between 1907 and 1920), challenged some of the findings of Spencer and Gillen's The Native Tribes of Central Australia (1899), which had been accepted by anthropologists as a true picture of the Aranda people. This led to a major controversy among British anthropologists, involving Andrew Lang, Sir James Frazer, Robert Ranulph Marett, A.C. Haddon, Spencer and later Bronisław Malinowski. The debate centred on whether Aboriginal people were primitive, on a lower level of evolution than Europeans (Frazer and Spencer's view) or a decadent people who had previously been on a higher level of culture (Strehlow's view).

From 1912 to 1922, Spencer attempted to shut down Strehlow's Hermannsburg Mission. In his 1913 report as Special Commissioner and Chief Protector, Spencer proposed taking all Aboriginal children away from their parents and setting up reserves where the children would be denied any contact with their parents, be prevented from speaking their languages and made incapable of living in the bush. While recognising that "this will undoubtedly be a difficult matter to accomplish and will involve some amount of hardship so far as the parents are concerned", Spencer justified it on the grounds that "once the children have grown to a certain age and have become accustomed to camp life with its degrading environment and endless roaming about in the bush, it is almost useless to try and reclaim them". So he thought it essential to take them away, for "then they will gradually lose the longing for a nomad life and will in fact become incapable of securing their living in the bush". He was particularly keen to make sure that "half-caste" children had no contact with camp life. Hermannsburg was to be taken away from the Lutherans and "serve as a reserve for the remnants of the southern central tribes where they can, under proper and competent control, be trained to habits of industry". However, when the Administrator of the Northern Territory, John A. Gilruth, came down from Darwin in 1913 to see whether these negative reports were true, he was impressed with what he saw and decided that the Strehlows and the mission should remain.

== Personal life ==
Spencer married Mary Elizabeth ('Lillie') Bowman in January 1887. The couple had two daughters, and a son who died in infancy.

=== Death ===
Spencer died from heart failure on 14 July 1929 during an expedition to Tierra del Fuego, Chile/Argentina. The events leading to his death are recorded in Spencer's own journal entries, and that of his research assistant Jean Hamilton. He was buried in Magallanes (Punta Arenas), Chile.

== Legacy ==
In 2009, an Australian Research Council project was established with the aim of aggregating and digitising the original Spencer and Gillen collection.

The Baldwin Spencer Building at the University of Melbourne (built 1888) was given his name in 1920. It was listed on the Victorian Heritage Register on 24 June 1992. Since the 1990's, there have been calls by university staff and students to rename the building. This is in light of Baldwin Spencer's well documented views about Aboriginal people and his advocacy for the removal of Aboriginal children from their families.

In 1976, Australia Post issued a postage stamp bearing Spencer's portrait.

Spencer is commemorated in the scientific names of two species of Australian lizards: Pseudemoia spenceri and Varanus spenceri.

== Selected works ==
- Spencer, Walter Baldwin; Gillen, Francis James (2014). The Native Tribes of Central Australia. Originally published: London, Macmillan and Co.,1899. University of Adelaide. Archived from the original on 9 September 2015.
- Spencer, Walter Baldwin; Gillen, F. J. (1904). The Northern Tribes of Central Australia. London: Macmillan and Co. OL 6943256M.
- Spencer, Walter Baldwin (1924). Wanderings in Wild Australia. London: Macmillan and Co. OL 13575672M.
- Spencer, Walter Baldwin (1931). Spencer's Last Journey. Being a Journal of an Expedition to Tierra Del Fuego by the Late Sir Baldwin Spencer. With a Memoir. Oxford: Clarendon Press. Edited by R. R. Marett and T. K. Penniman.

Awards
Preceded by Richard Thomas Baker	Clarke Medal; 1923	Succeeded by Joseph Maiden
