= Pseudemoia spenceri =

Conservation status
- Least Concern (IUCN 3.1)

Scientific classification
- Kingdom: Animalia
- Phylum: Chordata
- Class: Reptilia
- Order: Squamata
- Family: Scincidae
- Genus: Pseudemoia
- Species: P. spenceri

Binomial name
- Pseudemoia spenceri (Lucas & Frost, 1894)

Synonyms
- Lygosoma (Emoa) spenceri Lucas & Frost, 1894; Lygosoma (Liolepisma) weekesae Kinghorn, 1929; Ablepharus spenceri — M.A. Smith, 1937; Pseudemoia spenceri — Fuhn, 1967; Leiolopisma spenceri — Greer, 1974; Pseudemoia spenceri — Cogger, 1983

Species of lizard

Pseudemoia spenceri, also known commonly as Spencer's widow-eyed skink or the trunk-climbing cool-skink, is a species of lizard in the family Scincidae. The species is endemic to Australia.

== Etymology ==
The specific name, spenceri, is in honour of English-Australian biologist Walter Baldwin Spencer.

== Geographic range ==
P. spenceri is found in southeastern Australia, in the Australian states of New South Wales and Victoria.

== Habitat ==
The preferred natural habitats of P. spenceri are forest and rocky areas.

== Reproduction ==
P. spenceri is viviparous.
