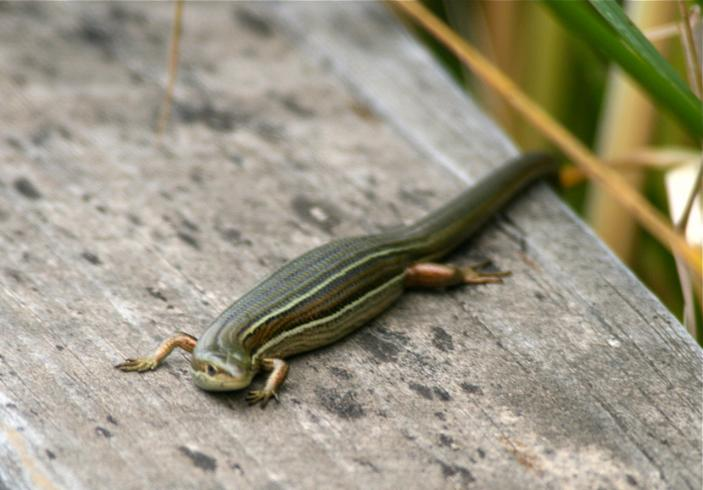
- Pseudemoia rawlinsoni

Scientific classification
- Domain: Eukaryota
- Kingdom: Animalia
- Phylum: Chordata
- Class: Reptilia
- Order: Squamata
- Family: Scincidae
- Subfamily: Eugongylinae
- Genus: Pseudemoia; Fuhn, 1967

Species
- 6, see text

= Pseudemoia =

Genus of lizards

Pseudemoia is a genus of skinks native to southeastern Australia. For similar skinks see genera Bassiana, Lampropholis, and Niveoscincus.

== Reproduction ==
At least in P. entrecasteauxii, P. pagenstecheri, and P. spenceri, a placenta-like structure is formed during pregnancy to pass nutrients to the developing offspring. Similar mammal-like adaptations also occur in the skink genera Chalcides, Eumecia, Mabuya, Niveoscincus, and Trachylepis.

== Species ==
Six species are recognized.

- Pseudemoia baudini (Greer, 1982) – Baudin's skink, Bight Coast skink
- Pseudemoia cryodroma Hutchinson & Donnellan, 1992 – alpine bog skink
- Pseudemoia entrecasteauxii (A.M.C. Duméril & Bibron, 1839) – southern grass skink, tussock cool-skink, tussock skink, Entrecasteaux's skink
- Pseudemoia pagenstecheri (Lindholm, 1901) – southern grass tussock skink, southern tussock grass skink
- Pseudemoia rawlinsoni (Hutchinson & Donnellan, 1988) – Rawlinson's window-eyed skink
- Pseudemoia spenceri (Lucas & Frost, 1894) – trunk-climbing cool-skink
