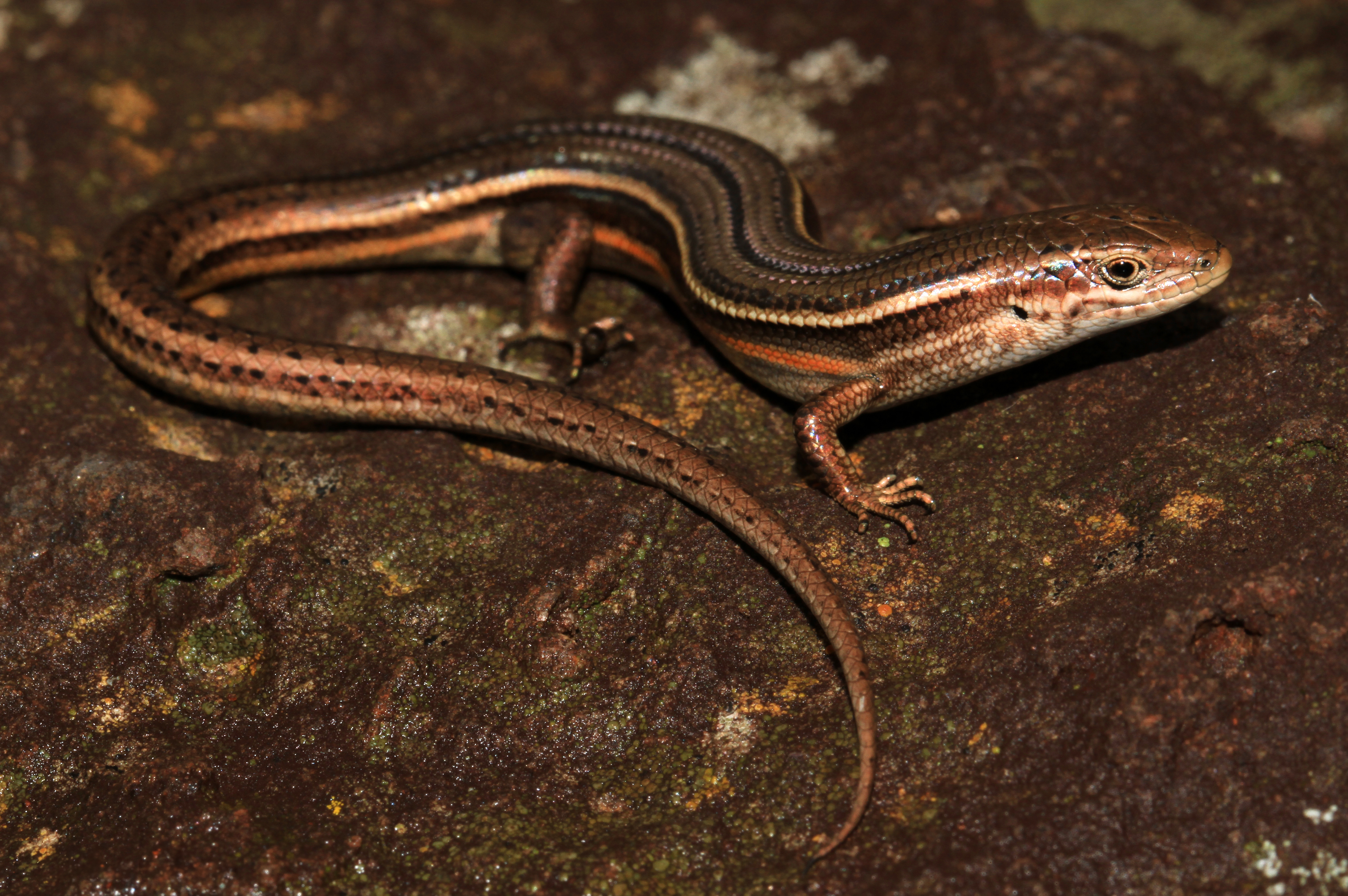

Conservation status
- Least Concern (IUCN 3.1)

Scientific classification
- Kingdom: Animalia
- Phylum: Chordata
- Class: Reptilia
- Order: Squamata
- Family: Scincidae
- Genus: Pseudemoia
- Species: P. pagenstecheri

Binomial name
- Pseudemoia pagenstecheri (Lindholm, 1901)
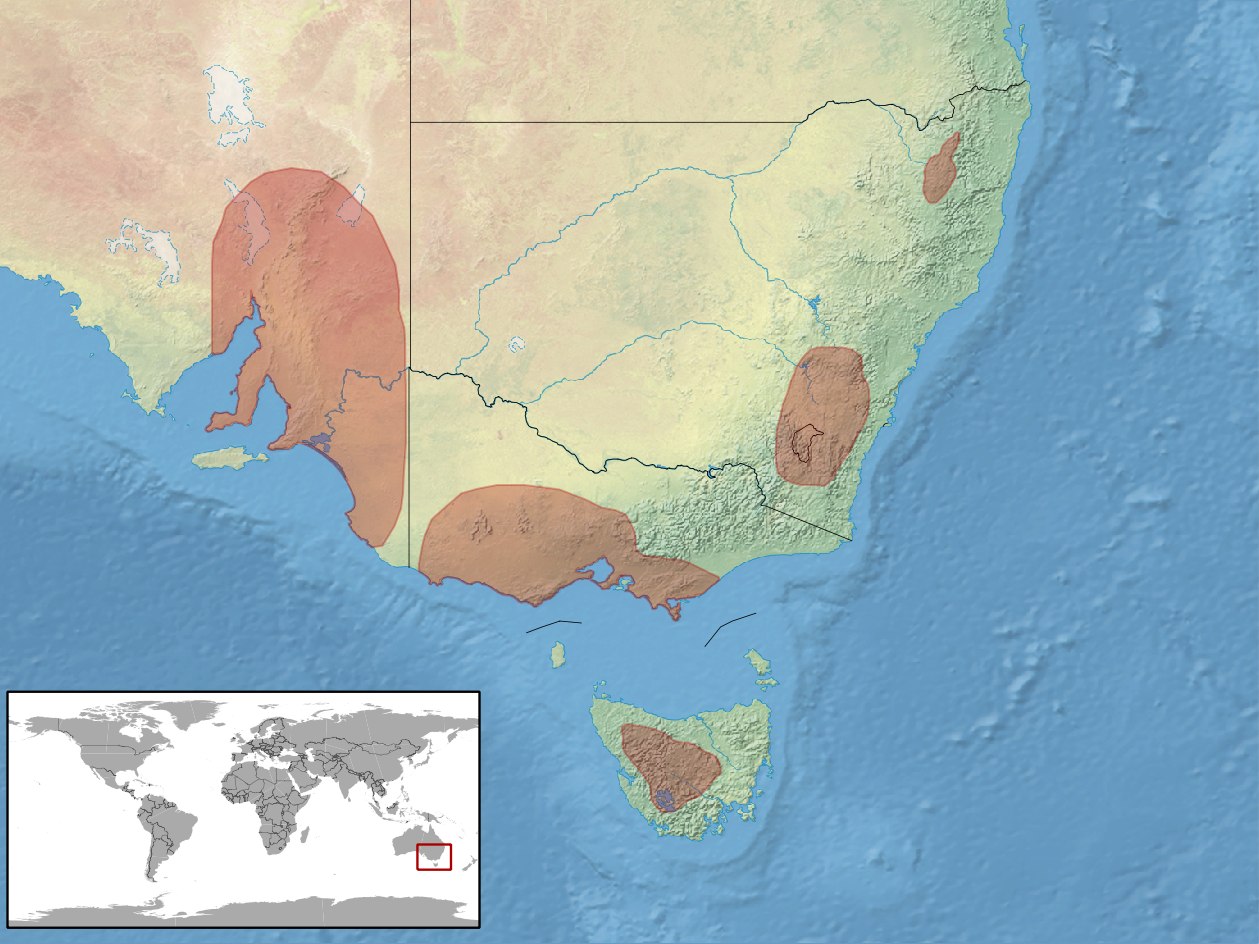

Synonyms
- Lygosoma (Liolepisma) pagenstecheri Lindholm, 1901; Pseudemoia pagenstecheri — Hutchinson & Donnellan, 1992

= Pseudemoia pagenstecheri =

Species of lizard

Pseudemoia pagenstecheri, also known commonly as the southern grass tussock skink and the southern tussock grass skink, is a species of lizard in the subfamily Eugongylinae of the family Scincidae. The species is endemic to Australia.

== Etymology ==
The specific name, pagenstecheri, is in honour of German zoologist Heinrich Alexander Pagenstecher.

== Geographic distribution ==
Pseudemoia pagenstecheri is found in eastern New South Wales, Tasmania, and northeastern Victoria, Australia.

== Habitat ==
The preferred natural habitat of Pseudemoia pagenstecheri is tussock grassland, especially medium to tall tussock grass.

== Reproduction ==
Pseudemoia pagenstecheri is viviparous.

== Hybridization ==
Pseudemoia pagenstecheri is known to hybridize with two other species in its genus, P. cryodroma and P. entrecasteauxii.

== Conservation status ==
The southern grass tussock skink is listed as "Least Concern" on the IUCN Red List of Threatened species. However, it is acknowledged that the current population is decreasing, especially in the Western Volcanic Plains of Melbourne. This is further confirmed by the Flora and Fauna Guarantee Act listing the species as "Endangered" in the Volcanic Plains and in the High Country (alpine) areas. The Flora and Fauna Guarantee Act uses the common assessment method, the method developed and considered best practice by IUCN, (and used to create the Red List).
