= Pseudemoia cryodroma =

Conservation status
- Endangered (IUCN 3.1)

Scientific classification
- Kingdom: Animalia
- Phylum: Chordata
- Class: Reptilia
- Order: Squamata
- Family: Scincidae
- Genus: Pseudemoia
- Species: P. cryodroma

Binomial name
- Pseudemoia cryodroma Hutchinson & Donnellan, 1992

Species of lizard

Pseudemoia cryodroma, also known commonly as the alpine bog skink, is a species of lizard in the family Scincidae. The species is endemic to Victoria in Australia.

== Habitat ==
The preferred natural habitats of P. cryodroma are freshwater wetlands, grassland, shrubland, and forest, at altitudes of at least 1,100 m (3,600 ft).

== Reproduction ==
P. cryodroma is viviparous.

== Hybridization ==
P. cryodroma is known to hybridize with two other species in its genus, P. entrecasteauxii and P. pagenstecheri.
