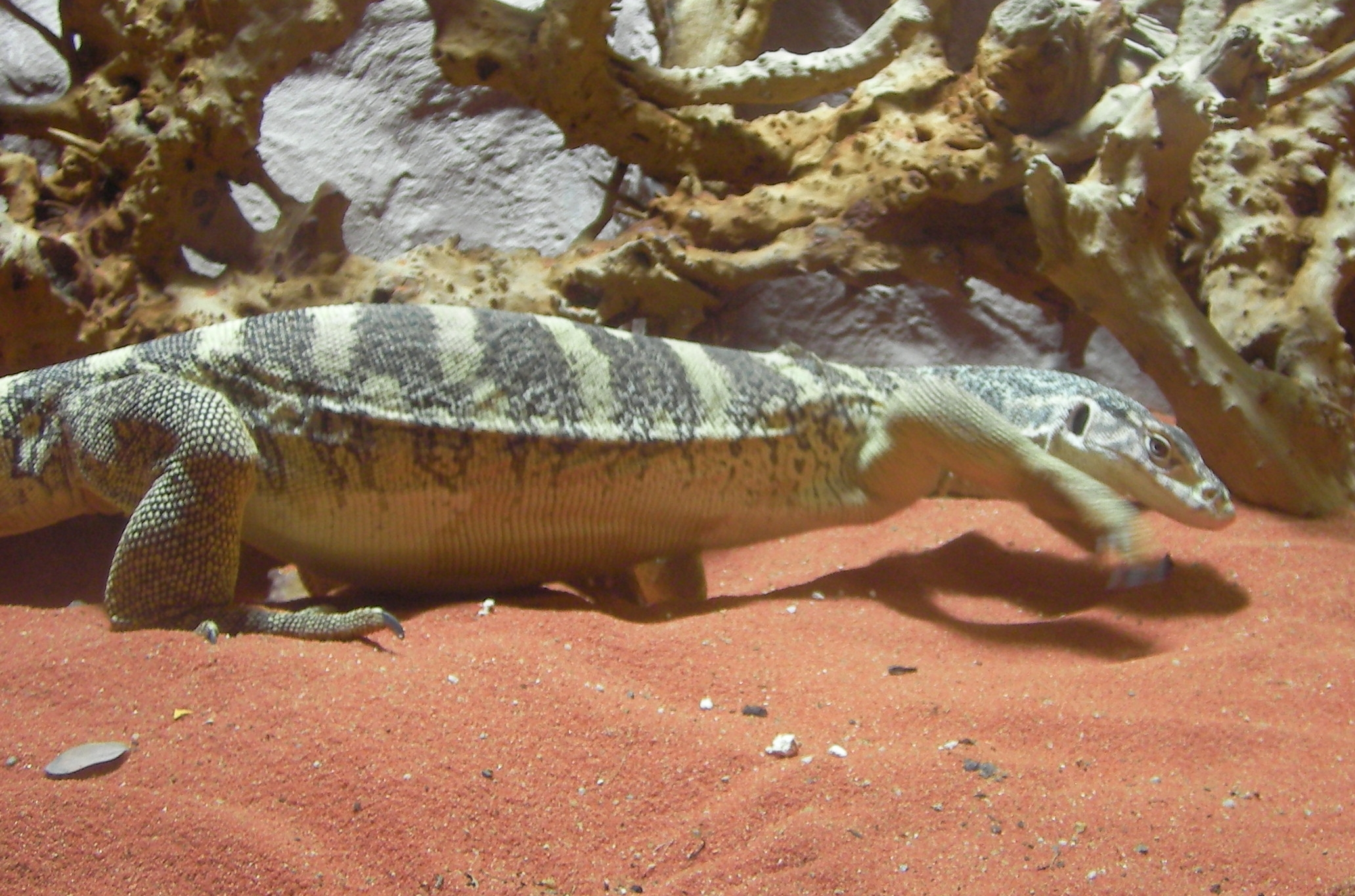
- Cologne Zoological Garden

Conservation status
- Least Concern (IUCN 3.1)

Scientific classification
- Kingdom: Animalia
- Phylum: Chordata
- Class: Reptilia
- Order: Squamata
- Suborder: Anguimorpha
- Family: Varanidae
- Genus: Varanus
- Subgenus: Varanus
- Species: V. spenceri

Binomial name
- Varanus spenceri Lucas & C. Frost, 1903
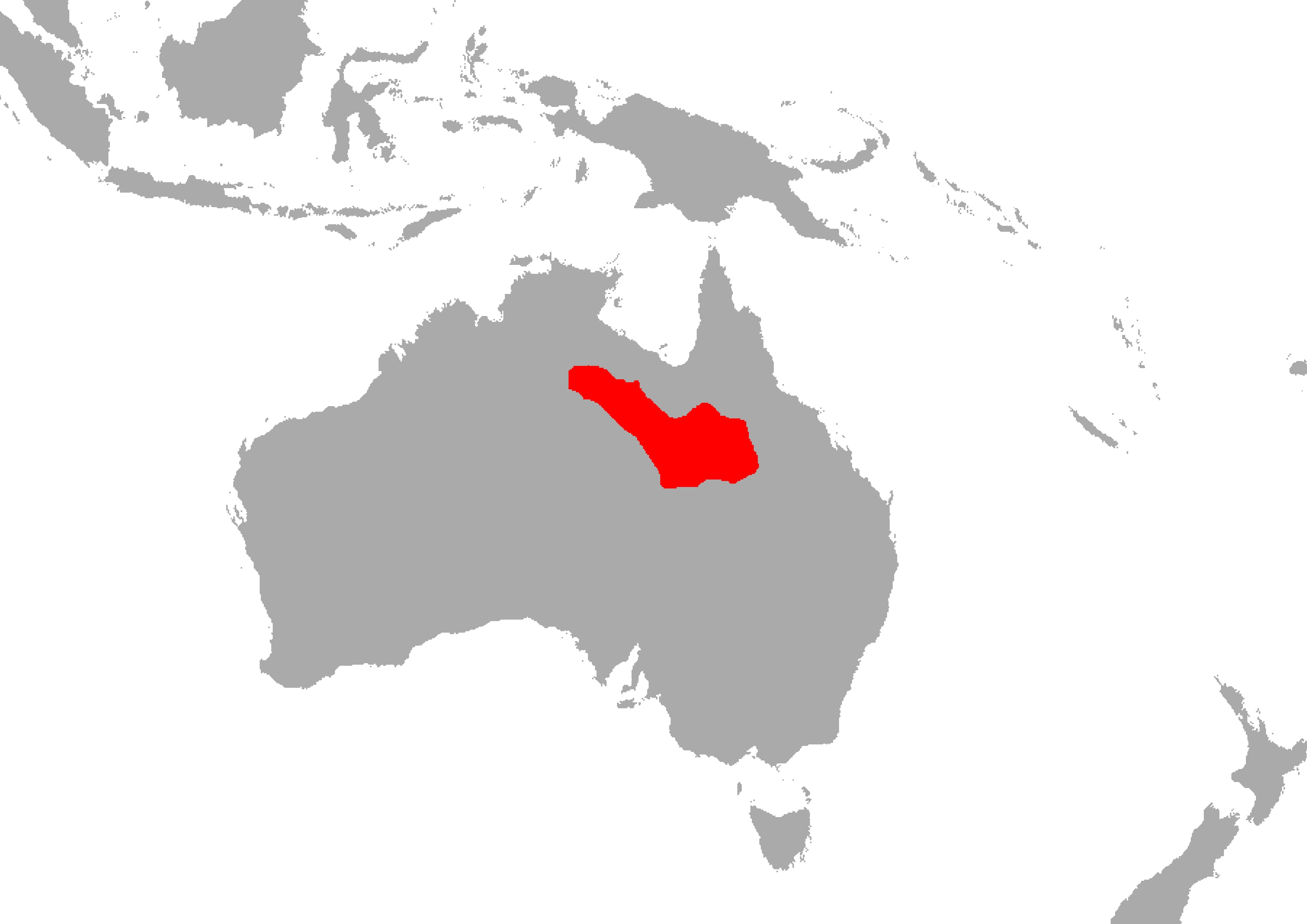

= Spencer's goanna =

Species of lizard

Spencer's goanna (Varanus spenceri), also known as the Spencer's monitor, is a species of Australian monitor lizard. It can be found in the Northern Territory and Queensland.

== Etymology ==
The specific name, spenceri, is in honour of English-Australian biologist Walter Baldwin Spencer.

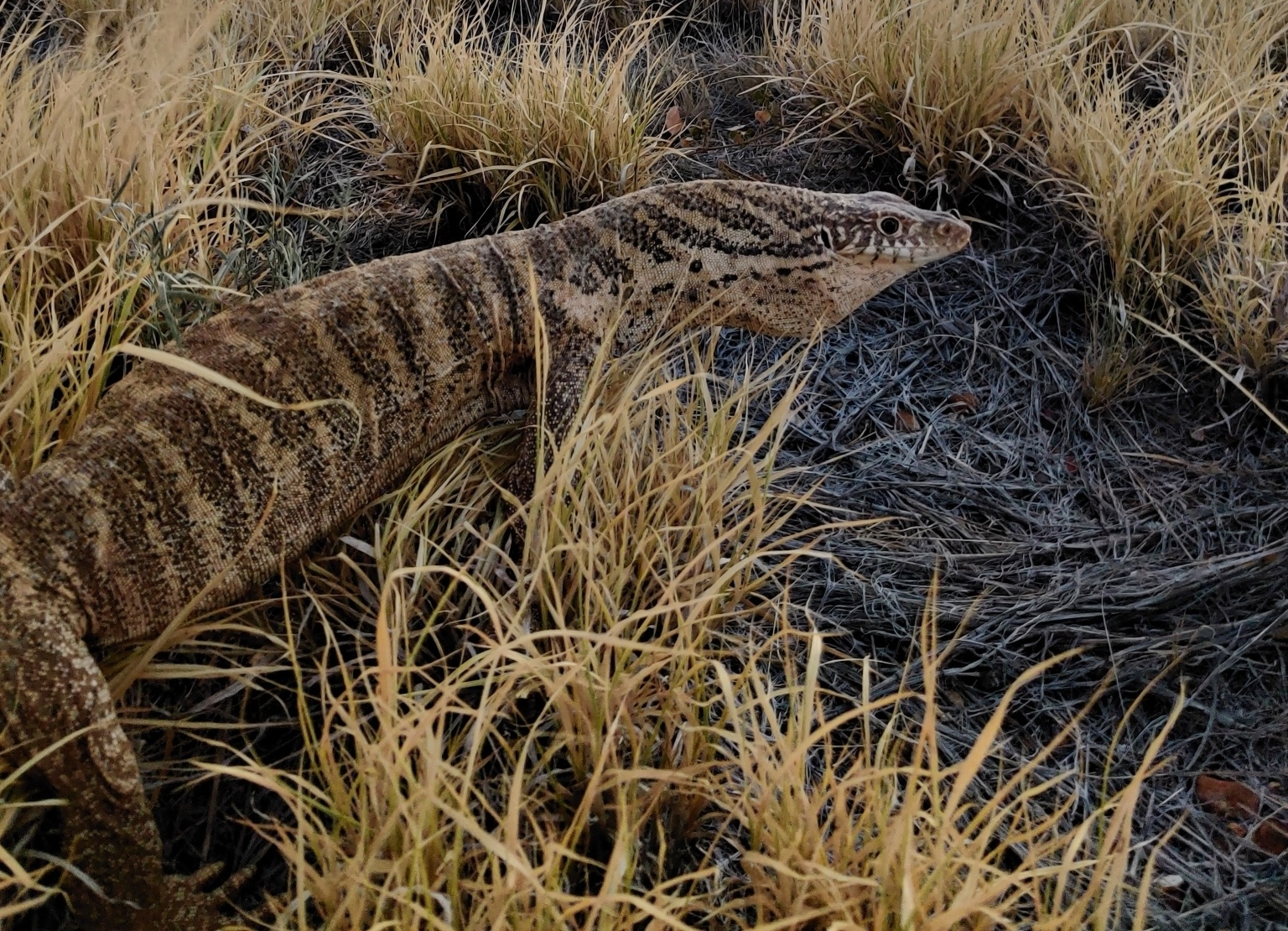

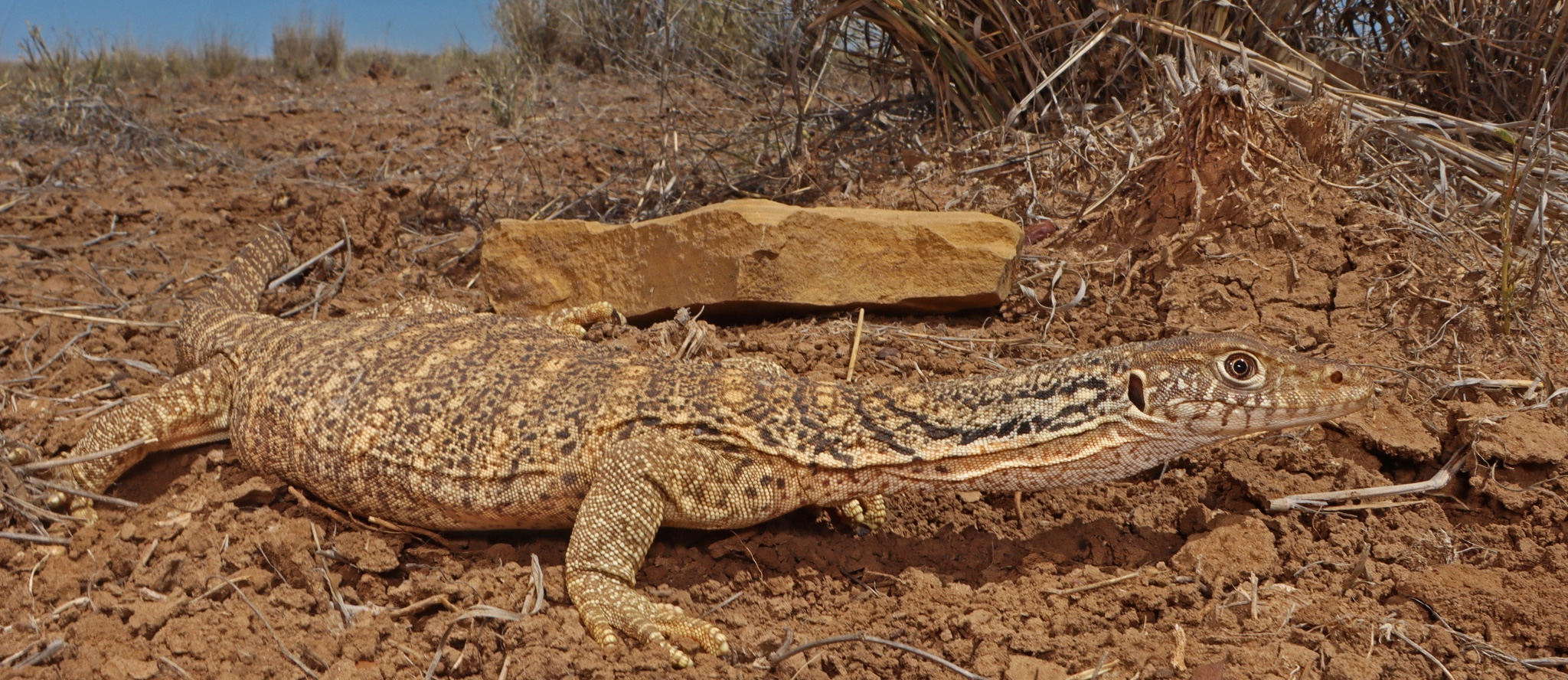
Queensland, Australia

== Description ==
It can grow to a total length (including tail) of up to 120 cm (47 in). It is generally heavier than other similarly sized monitor lizards due to its stockier build. It has sharp claws which it uses for digging burrows.

It will eat anything it can find, including highly venomous snakes, small mammals, small lizards, eggs, as well as carrion, and is able to digest anything it eats.

It exhibits unusual defensive behaviour, where it feigns death when threatened; the body is flattened against the ground, one hind limb is extended while all other limbs held close to the body, and the tail is contorted into a wavy shape. The head is kept up to observe the threat, feigning death until the threat has left the area.

It reproduces oviparously. The clutch size of the Spencer's monitor generally ranges from between 11 and 30 eggs.

== Habitat ==
The preferred natural habitat of the Spencer's goanna is grassland.

Living in black soil plains with no trees, Spencer's goanna is the only Australian monitor that does not readily climb, although juvenile animals will climb given the opportunity.

== Taxonomy ==
Varanus ingrami Boulenger, 1906, is an invalid name (a junior synonym) for this species.
