= Old Pathology Building Melbourne University =

Old Pathology Building
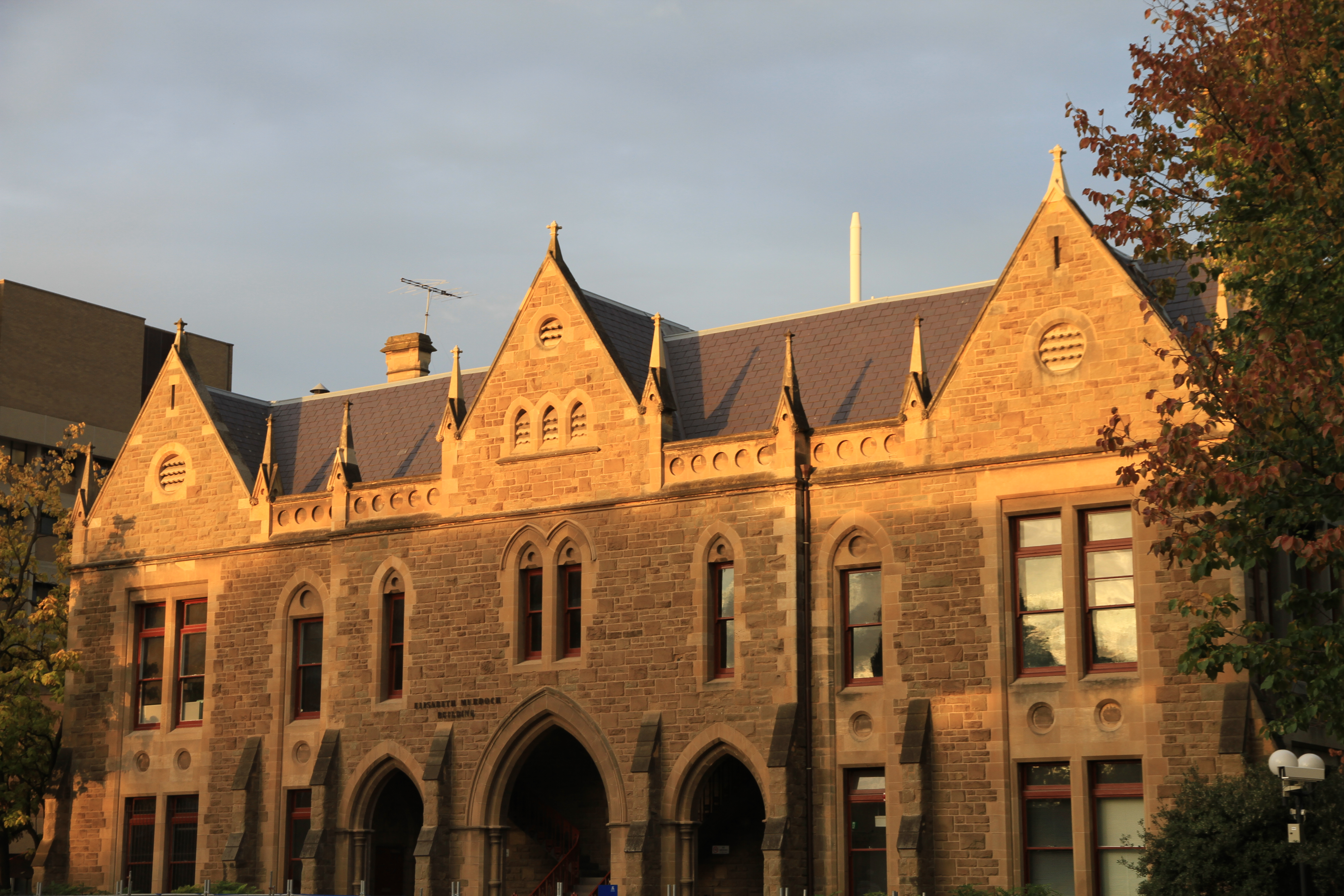
- Old Pathology Building, May 2013
- Alternative names: Elisabeth Murdoch Building; Building 134
- Etymology: Elisabeth Murdoch

General information
- Status: Completed
- Type: Academic administration
- Architectural style: English Gothic architecture; Victorian Academic Gothic
- Location: 156-292 Grattan Street, The University of Melbourne, Parkville Campus, Melbourne, Victoria, Australia
- Coordinates: 37°47′51″S 144°57′48″E
- Completed: 1885
- Owner: The University of Melbourne

Technical details
- Material: Bluestone walls; slate roof
- Floor count: 2

Design and construction
- Architecture firm: Reed, Henderson & Smart (1885); Smart, Tappin and Peebles (1900)

Victorian Heritage Register
- Official name: Old Pathology Building
- Type: State heritage (built)
- Designated: 24 June 1992
- Reference no.: 914
- Significance: Registered

The Old Pathology Building, officially renamed as the Elisabeth Murdoch Building, is an educational building, part of the Parkville campus of the University of Melbourne, in Melbourne, Victoria, Australia. The building is located at 156-292 Grattan Street as building number 134, campus reference number F20. Built in 1885 by architects Reed, Henderson & Smart, the Old Pathology Building is of historical and architectural significance to the State of Victoria, due to its example of early English Gothic architecture and its continued use as a university building for over 100 years. The building was added to the Victorian Heritage Register on 24 June 1992.

== Background ==
Classes at the University of Melbourne began in 1853 and in 1862 the university established Australia's first medical school. Appointed as professor of anatomy and pathology at the university in 1882, H. B. Allen oversaw the design process of the new building. His first task was to create a large and efficient museum. Allen built up a collection of thousands of pathology specimens which form the core of the museum.

Allen's successor, Peter MacCallum, established the Society of Pathology and Experimental Science in 1930. MacCallum demonstrated the university's significant role in medical research during the 1950s and the need for research laboratories.

== Description ==
Built during the Victorian period in the Neo-Gothic style, the old pathology building is a two-storey education building at the university's Parkville campus. The building is a fine example of early English Gothic architecture characterised by the use of lancet arches and attached buttresses. The choice of a Gothic style came as a request from the University Council's desire that all buildings be built in a consistent architectural style. The building was originally designed as the new medical school along with the department of anatomy and pathology. The south wing of which was originally constructed in 1885, the building has seen many additions made over the following years.

Following the Gothic style, the principle facades have bluestone plinths and are buttressed, with stone walls, a slate clad steeply pitched roof. The north and west wings are constructed of brick with segmental and square headed windows. The south building illustrates the original concept for the "new medical school", and includes the original Museum of Pathology which housed Allen's collection until the 1960s. The north wing was designed to accommodate a dissecting room, associated coffin and preparation rooms, and anatomy lecture theatre.

=== Key influences and design approach ===
The Old Pathology Building uses Victorian Academic Gothic design attributes such as lancet arches and attached buttresses. The University Council's influence is evident on the building's design in the collegiate Gothic style. The facade of whole building is generally similar. All of the program spaces were planned to centre around the court yard. The building is famous as the expansion of the first medical school in Australia. It played an import role in medical training during the nineteenth century when disease was reaching epidemic proportions.

== Gallery ==
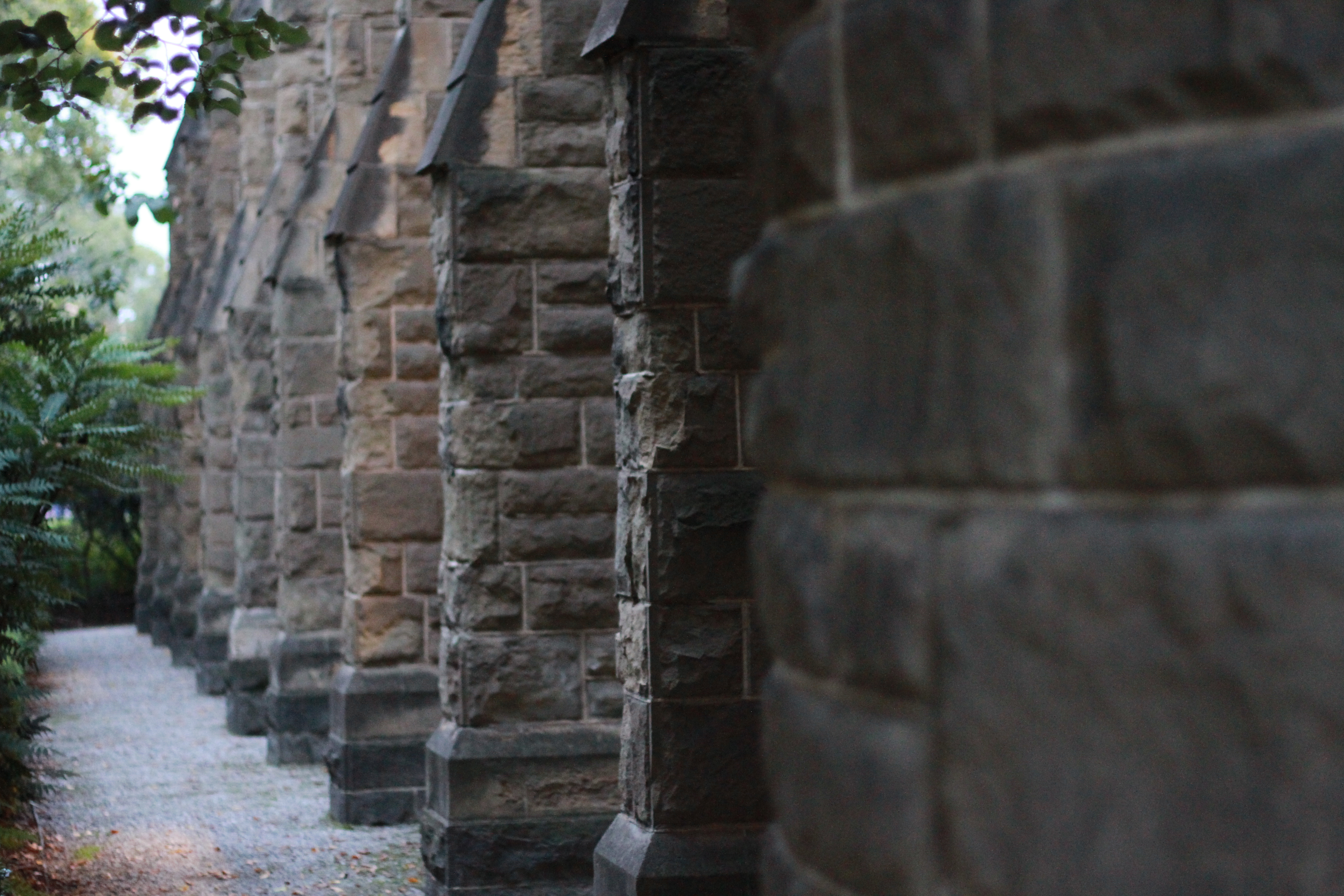
Bluestone used

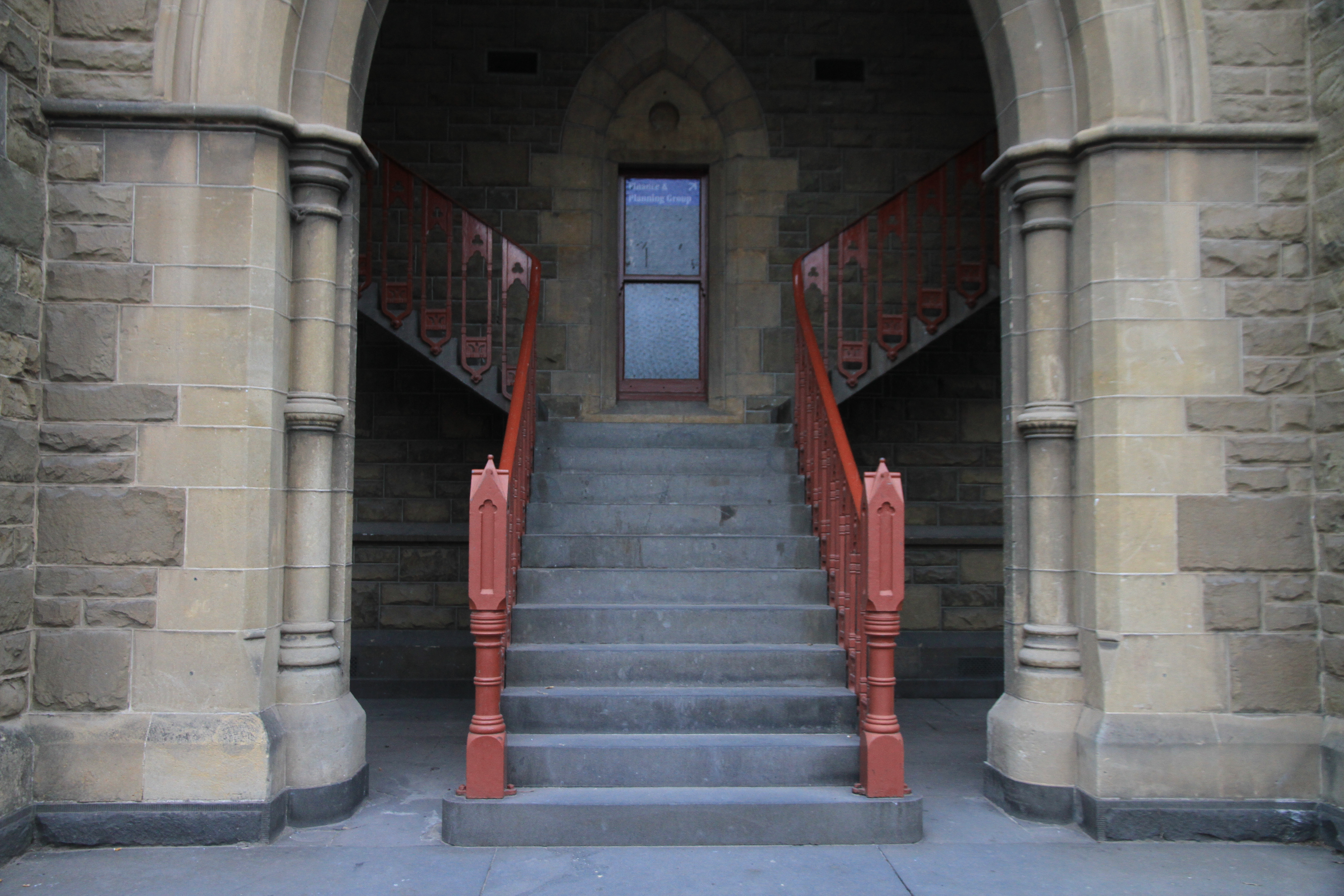
Entrance and split stairwell

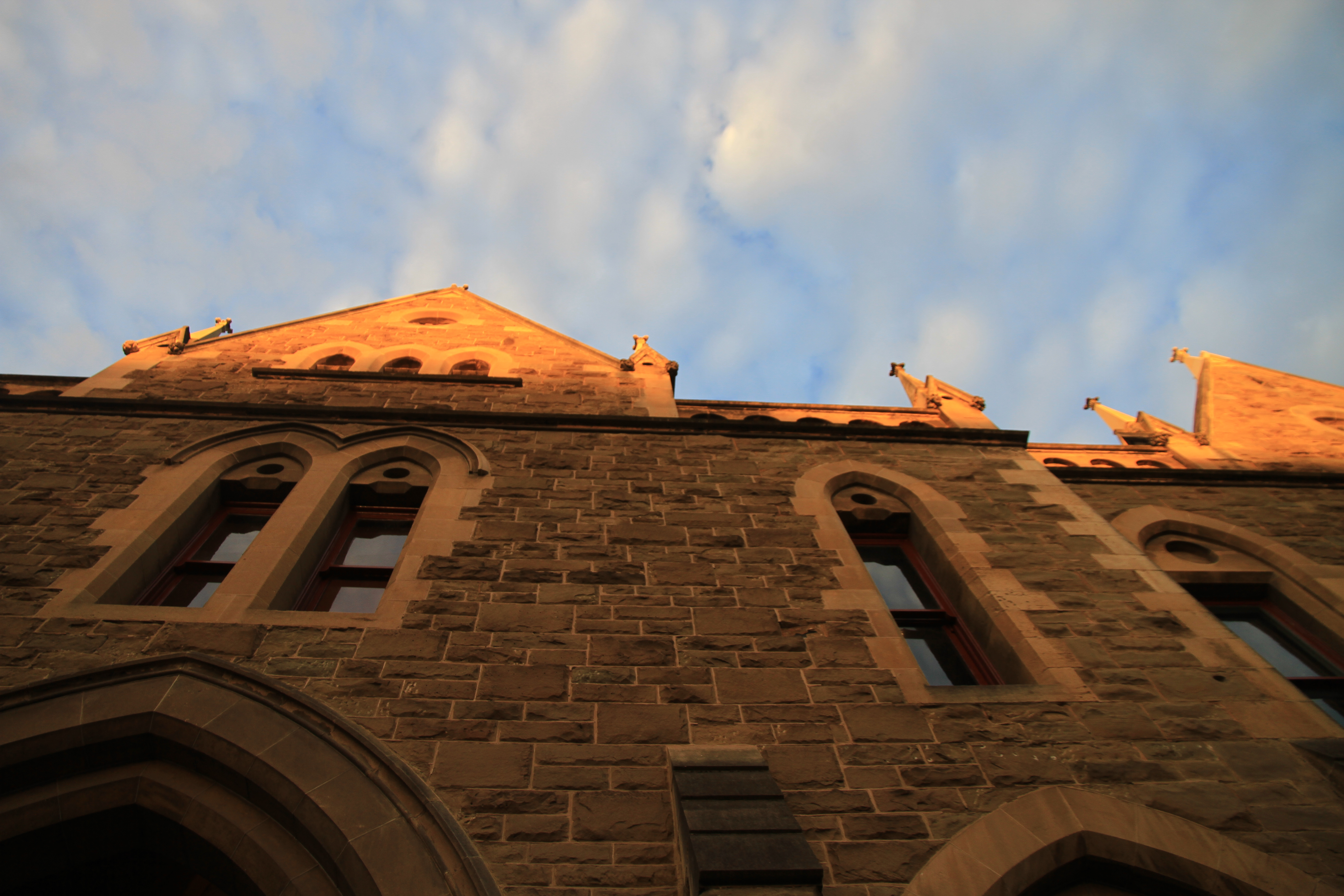
Early English Gothic arches and window arches

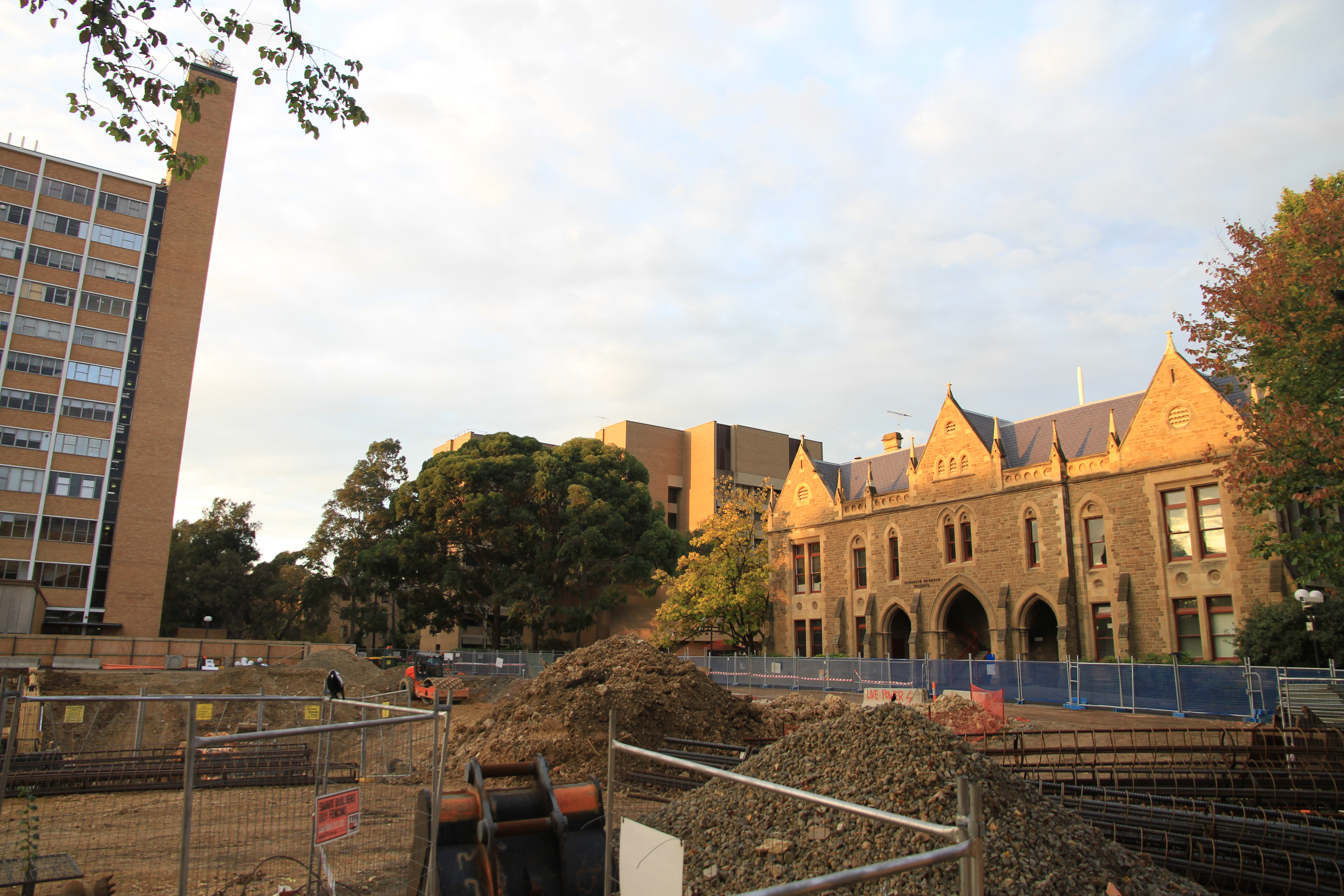
Construction works for the new Architecture Building in front of Old Pathology Building

The Old Commons Building current site map

The Old Commons Building current floor plan
