= List of the Mesozoic life of Montana =

This list of the Mesozoic life of Montana contains the various prehistoric life-forms whose fossilized remains have been reported from within the US state of Montana and are between 252.17 and 66 million years of age.

== A ==
- †Achelousaurus – type locality for genus
  - †Achelousaurus horneri – type locality for species
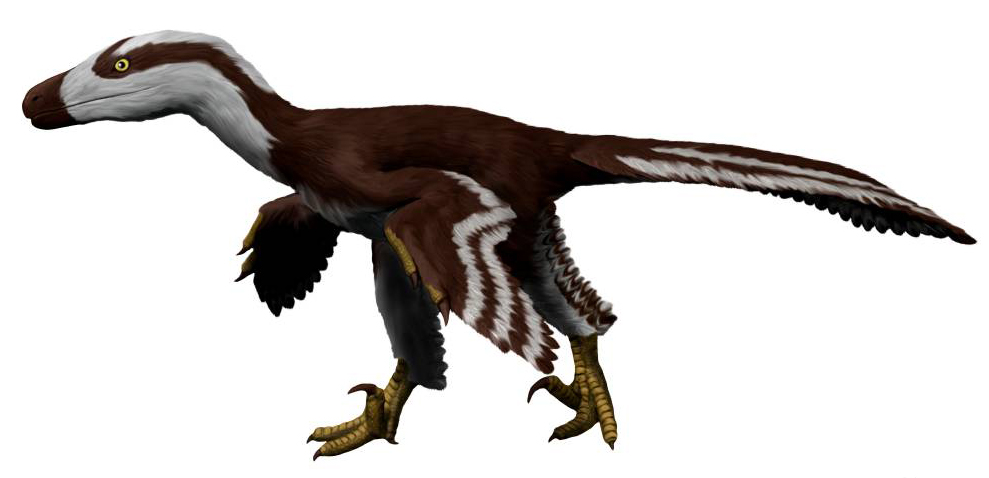
- Life restoration of the Late Cretaceous dromaeosaurid ("raptor") Acheroraptor
  †Acheroraptor – type locality for genus
  - †Acheroraptor temertyorum – type locality for species
- Acipenser
  - †Acipenser eruciferus
- †Acristavus – type locality for genus
  - †Acristavus gagslarsoni – type locality for species
- †Acrostichopteris
  - †Acrostichopteris longipennis
- †Adiantites
  - †Adiantites montanensis
- †Adocus
- †Albanerpeton
  - †Albanerpeton nexuosus
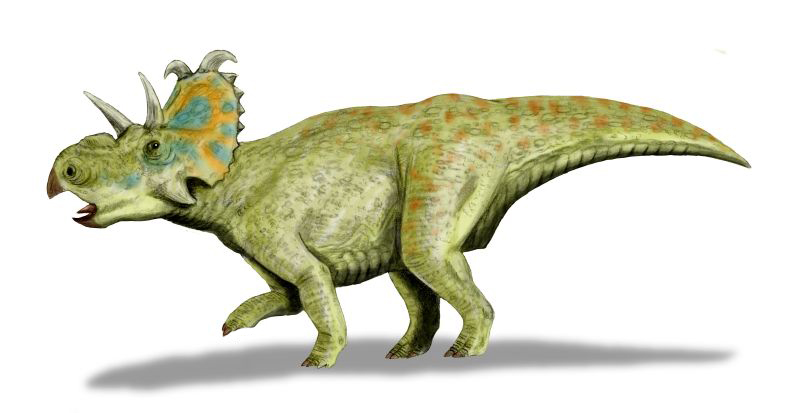
- Life restoration of the Late Cretaceous horned dinosaur Albertaceratops
  †Albertaceratops
  - †Albertaceratops nesmoi
- †Albertatherium
  - †Albertatherium primus
- †Albertosaurus
- †Allocrioceras
  - †Allocrioceras annulatum
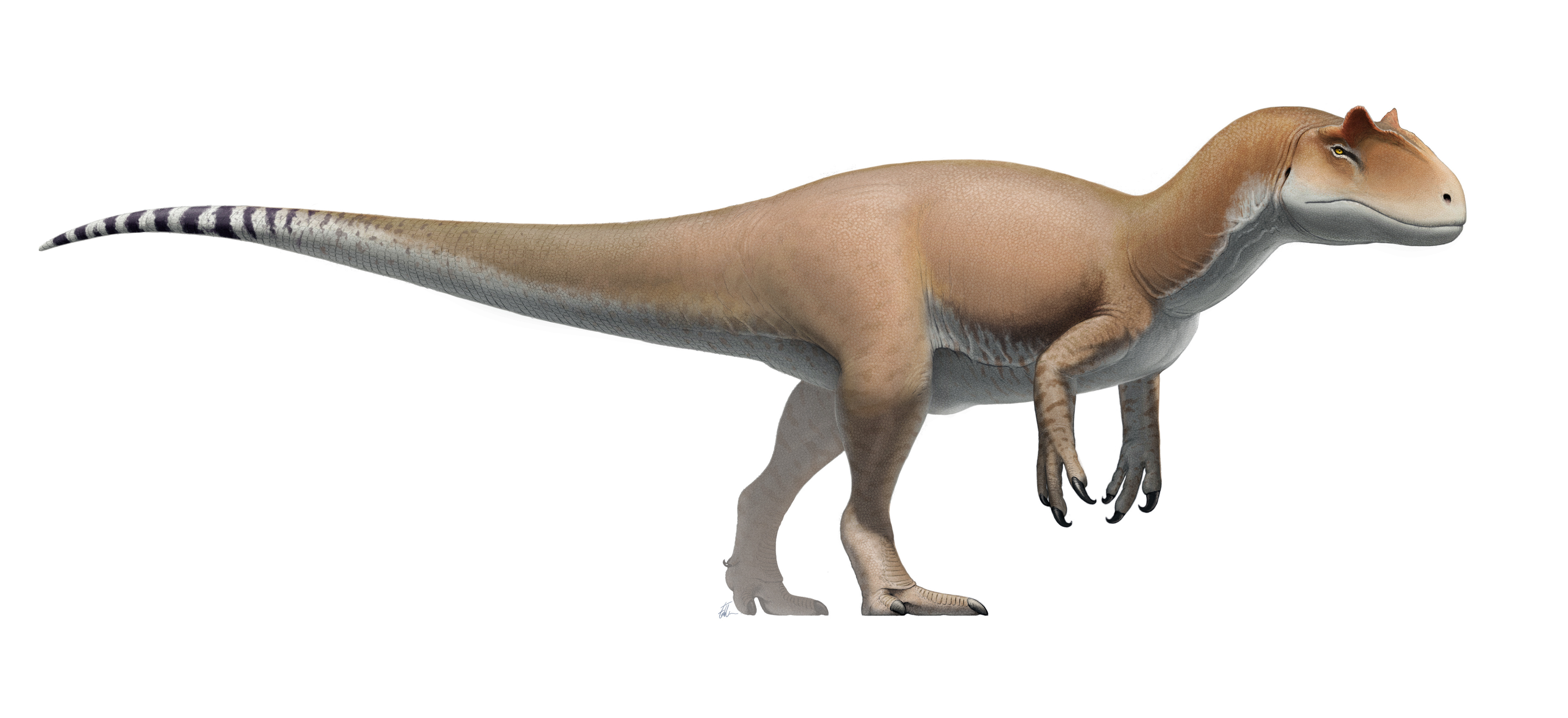
- Life restoration of the Late Jurassic theropod dinosaur Allosaurus
  †Allosaurus
- †Alostera
  - †Alostera saskatchewanensis
- †Alphadon
  - †Alphadon attaragos
  - †Alphadon halleyi – type locality for species
  - †Alphadon marshi
  - †Alphadon wilsoni
- †Altacreodus
  - †Altacreodus magnus
- †Alzadasaurus – tentative report
- †Alzadites – type locality for genus
  - †Alzadites alzadensis – type locality for species
- †Ambilestes
  - †Ambilestes cerberoides – or unidentified comparable form
- Amia
  - †Amia fragosa
  - †Amia uintaensis
- †Amphicoelias
- †Anatotitan
  - †Anatotitan copei
- †Anchura – tentative report
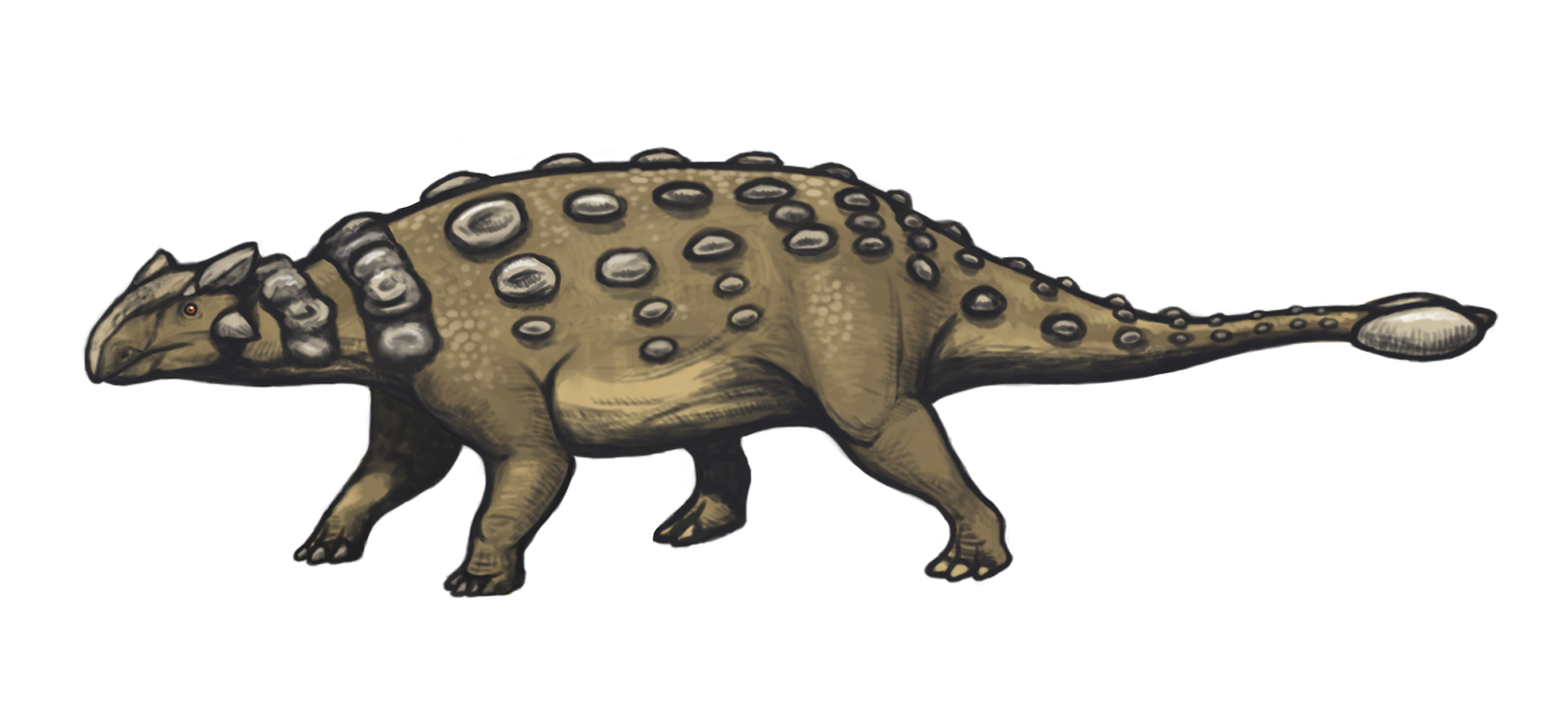
- Life restoration of the Late Cretaceous armored dinosaur Ankylosaurus
  †Ankylosaurus – type locality for genus
  - †Ankylosaurus magniventris – type locality for species
- †Anomozamites
- †Aquiladelphis
  - †Aquiladelphis incus
  - †Aquiladelphis minor
- †Aquilapollenites
  - †Aquilapollenites collaris
  - †Aquilapollenites conatus
  - †Aquilapollenites marmarthensis
  - †Aquilapollenites mtchedlishvilii
  - †Aquilapollenites quadrilobus
  - †Aquilapollenites turbidus
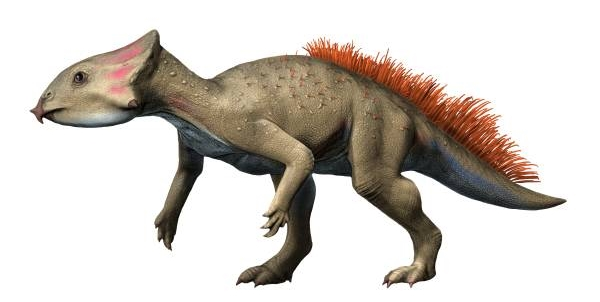
- Life restoration of the Early Cretaceous primitive horned dinosaur Aquilops
  †Aquilops – type locality for genus
  - †Aquilops americanus – type locality for species
- Aralia – or unidentified comparable form
  - †Aralia wellingtonia
- †Araliaephyllum
  - †Araliaephyllum westonii
- †Araliopsoides
  - †Araliopsoides cretacea – or unidentified comparable form
- †Araucarites
  - †Araucarites longifolia
- †Arcellites
- †Archaeolamna
  - †Archaeolamna kopingensis
- †Archaeotriakis – type locality for genus
  - †Archaeotriakis rochelleae – type locality for species
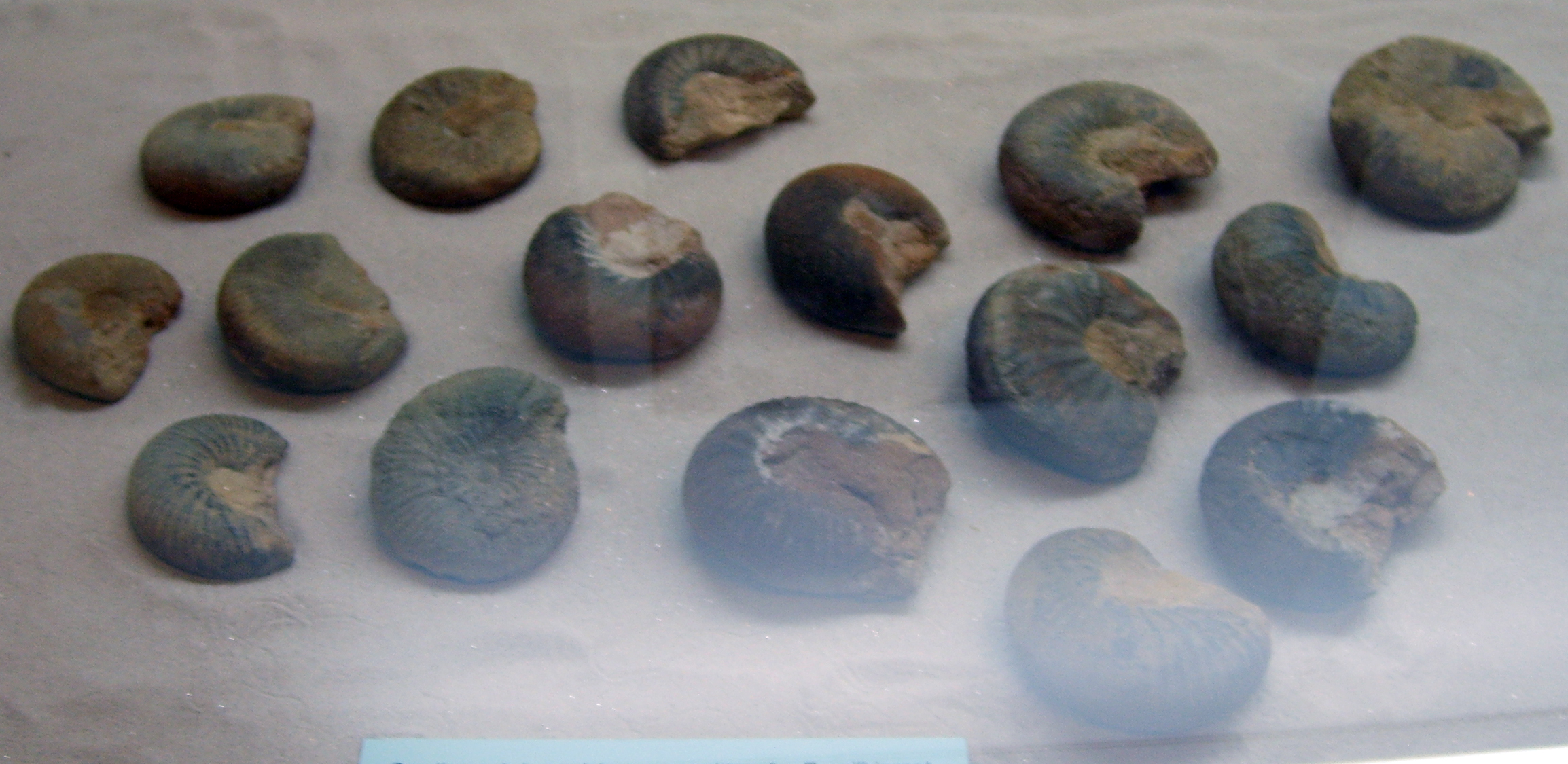
- Fossilized shells of the Middle Jurassic ammonoid cephalopod Arcticoceras
  †Arcticoceras – tentative report
- †Arctocephalites
  - †Arctocephalites gracilis – or unidentified comparable form
  - †Arctocephalites maculatus – or unidentified comparable form
  - †Arctocephalites platynotus – or unidentified comparable form
  - †Arctocephalites sawtoothensis
  - †Arctocephalites saypoensis
- †Argaliatherium – type locality for genus
  - †Argaliatherium robustum – type locality for species
- †Ariadnaesporites
  - †Ariadnaesporites fluviatilis – type locality for species
- †Ascarinites – type locality for genus
  - †Ascarinites communis – type locality for species
- †Aspideretoides
- †Aspidophyllum – or unidentified comparable form
  - †Aspidophyllum trilobatum
- †Asplenium
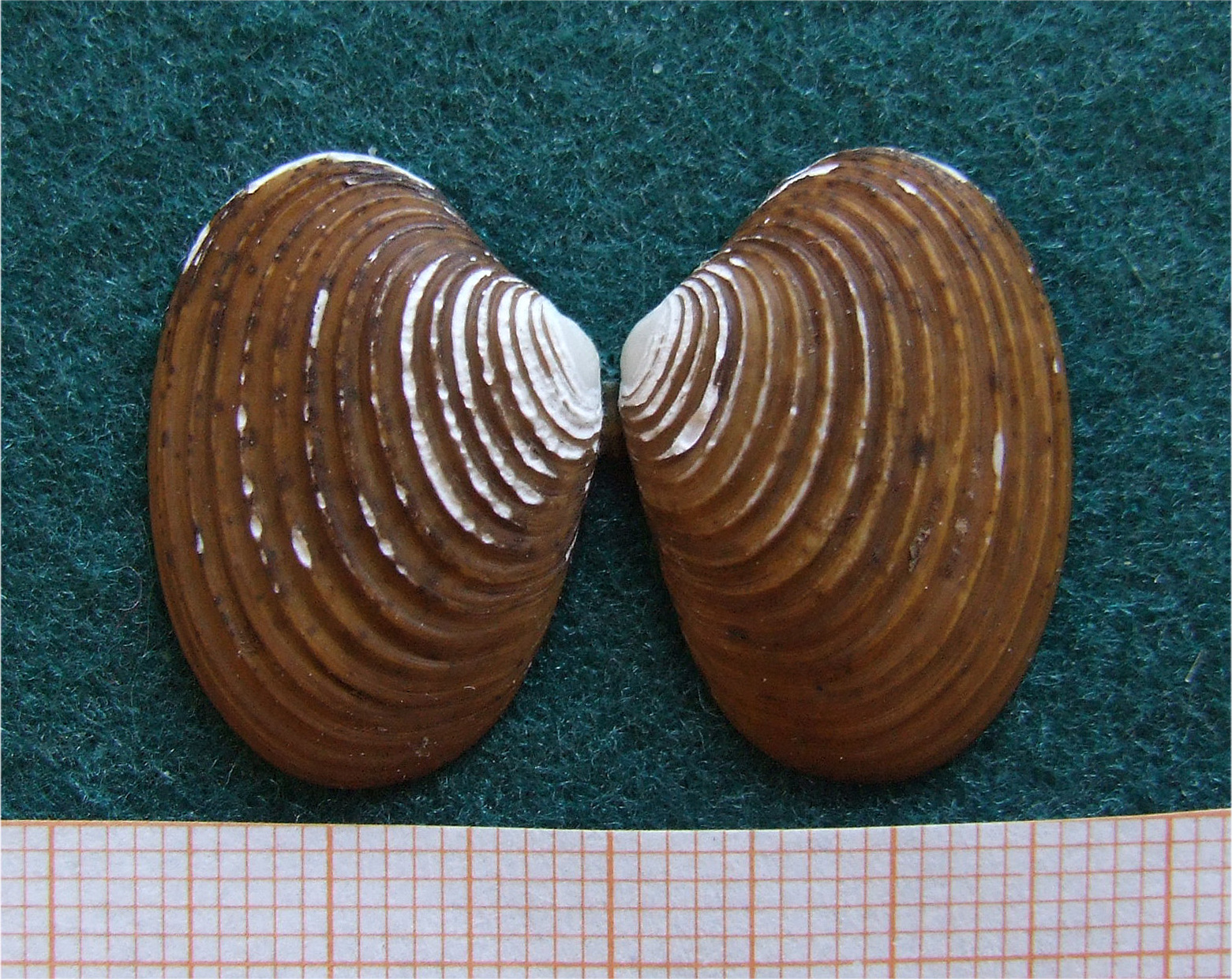
- Shell of a modern Astarte bivalve
  Astarte
  - †Astarte meeki
  - †Astarte morion
  - †Astarte packardi – or unidentified comparable form
- †Athrotaxites
  - †Athrotaxites berryi – or unidentified comparable form
- †Aublysodon
  - †Aublysodon mirandus
- †Austrotindaria
  - †Austrotindaria canalensis
  - †Austrotindaria svalbardensis
- †Avaceratops – type locality for genus
  - †Avaceratops lammersi – type locality for species
- Avicula
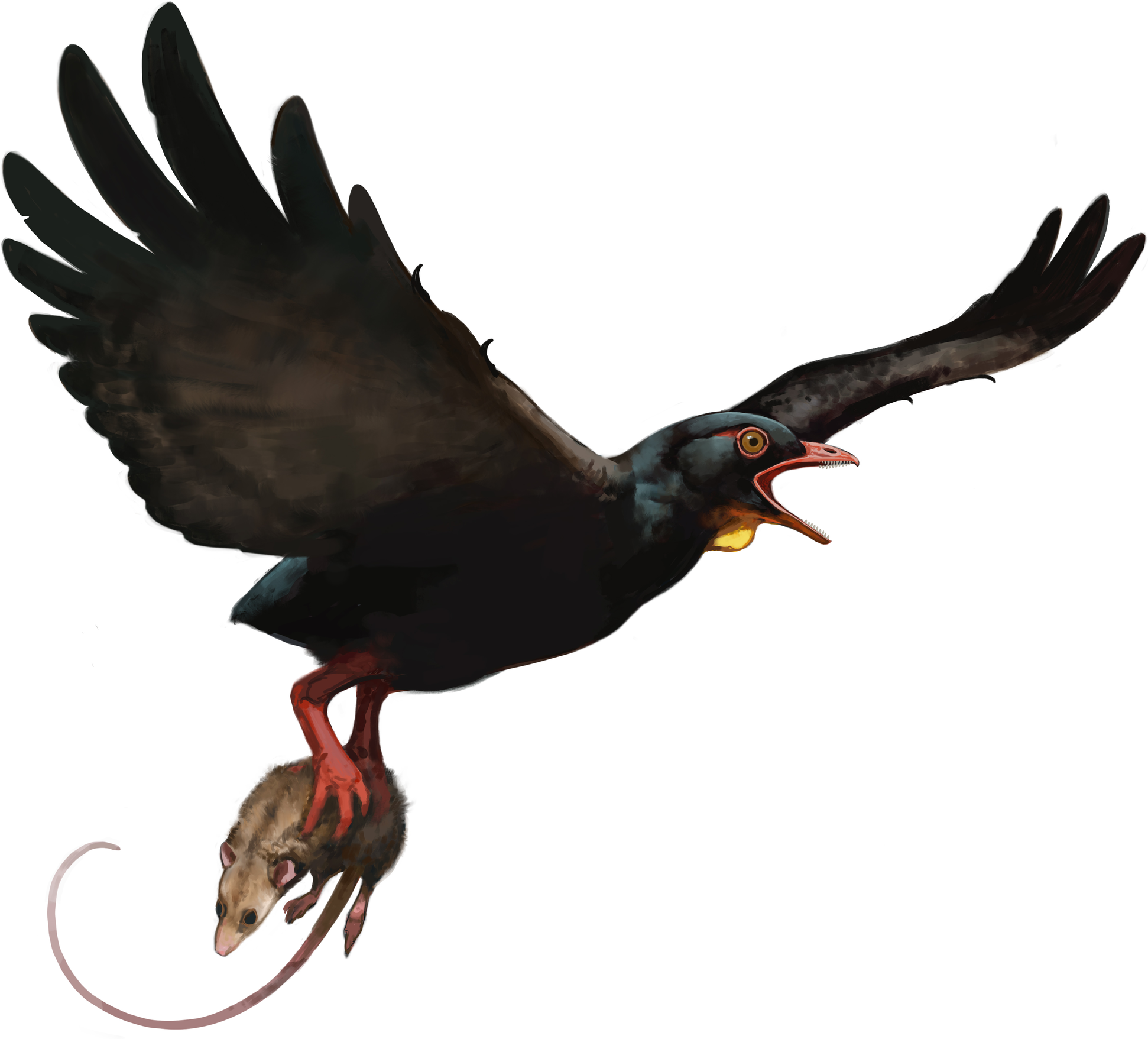
- Life restoration of the Late Cretaceous toothed bird Avisaurus with prey
  †Avisaurus – type locality for genus
  - †Avisaurus archibaldi – type locality for species
  - †Avisaurus gloriae – type locality for species
- †Axestemys
  - †Axestemys splendida – type locality for species
- Azolla
  - †Azolla barbata
  - †Azolla circinata – type locality for species
  - †Azolla distincta
  - †Azolla simplex – type locality for species
  - †Azolla spinata – type locality for species
- †Azollopsis – type locality for genus
  - †Azollopsis coccoides – type locality for species
  - †Azollopsis tomentosa – type locality for species

== B ==
- †Baculatisporites
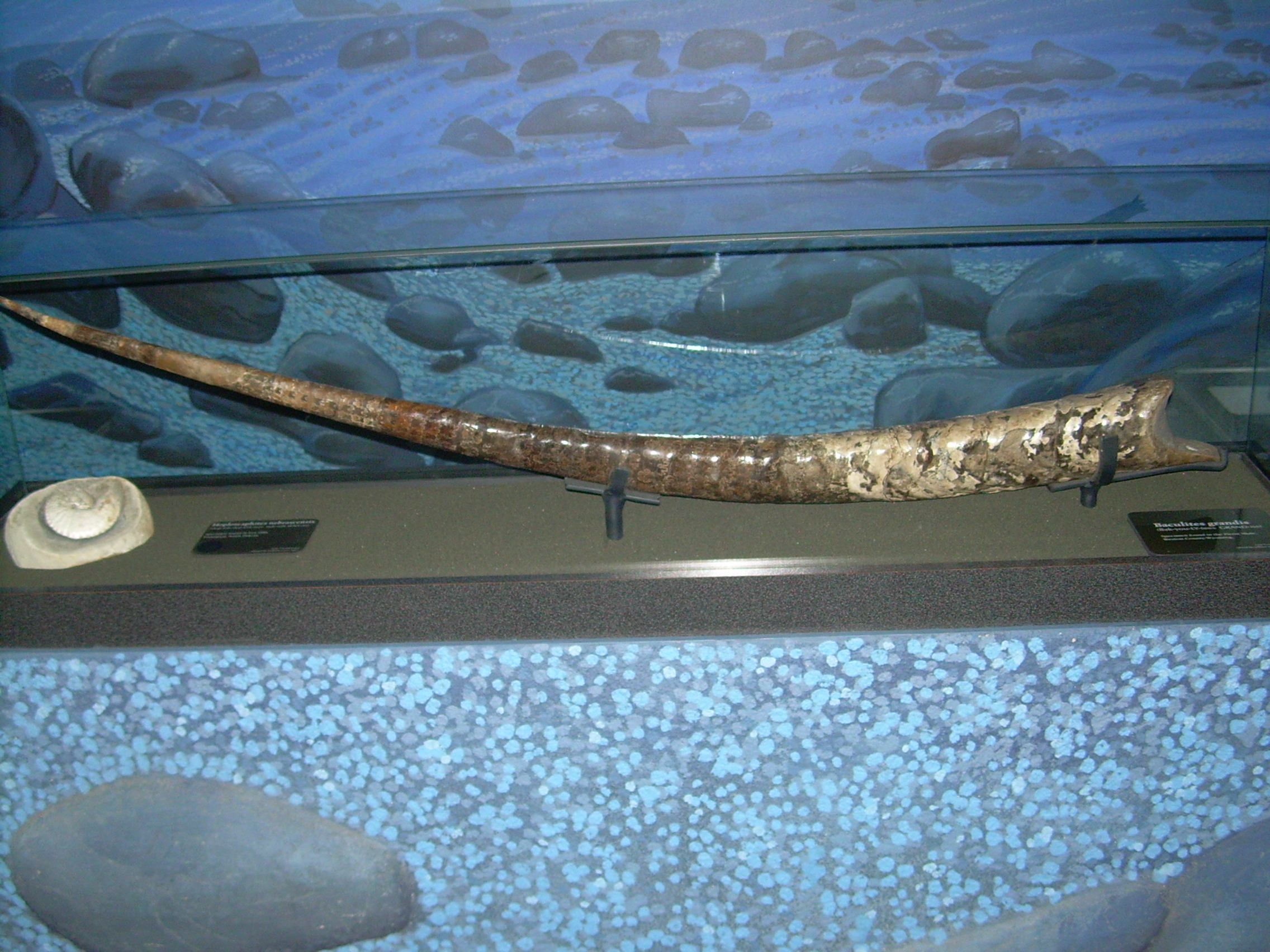
- Fossilized shell of the Late Cretaceous ammonoid cephalopod Baculites
  †Baculites
  - †Baculites asper
  - †Baculites codyensis
  - †Baculites compressus
  - †Baculites mariasensis
- †Baena
  - †Baena callosa – type locality for species
- †Baioconodon
  - †Baioconodon nordicus – or unidentified comparable form
- †Bakevellia
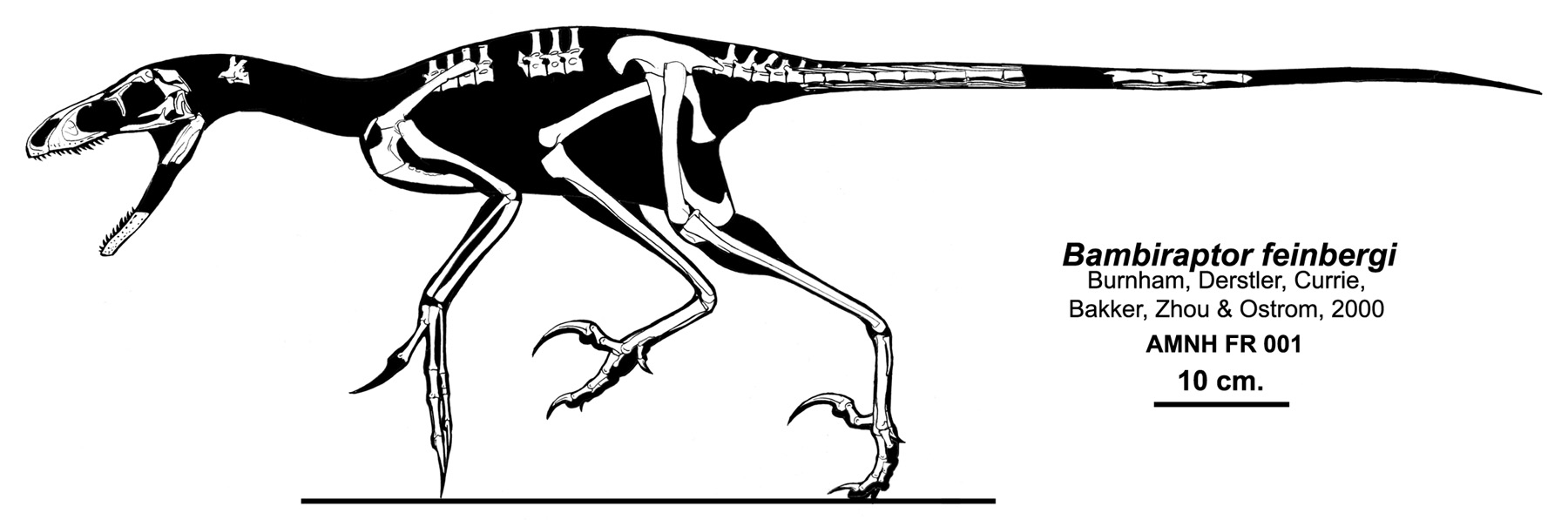
- Diagram of the known fossil material of the Late Cretaceous dromaeosaurid ("raptor") Bambiraptor
  †Bambiraptor – type locality for genus
  - †Bambiraptor feinbergi – type locality for species
- Barbourula – or unidentified comparable form
- †Basilemys
  - †Basilemys sinuosa – type locality for species
- †Batodon
  - †Batodon tenuis
- †Belfria – type locality for genus
  - †Belfria microphylla – type locality for species
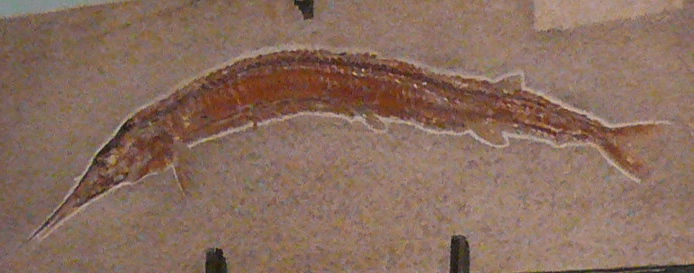
- Fossilized skeleton of the Late Cretaceous bony fish Belonostomus
  †Belonostomus
  - †Belonostomus longirostris
- †Bernissartia
- †Biretisporites
  - †Biretisporites deltoideus
- †Borealosuchus
  - †Borealosuchus sternbergii
- †Boremys
  - †Boremys pulchra
- †Borissiakoceras
  - †Borissiakoceras orbiculatum
- Brachaelurus
  - †Brachaelurus estesi
- †Brachyceratops – type locality for genus
  - †Brachyceratops montanensis – type locality for species
- †Brachychampsa – type locality for genus
  - †Brachychampsa montana – type locality for species
  - †Brachychampsa montanus
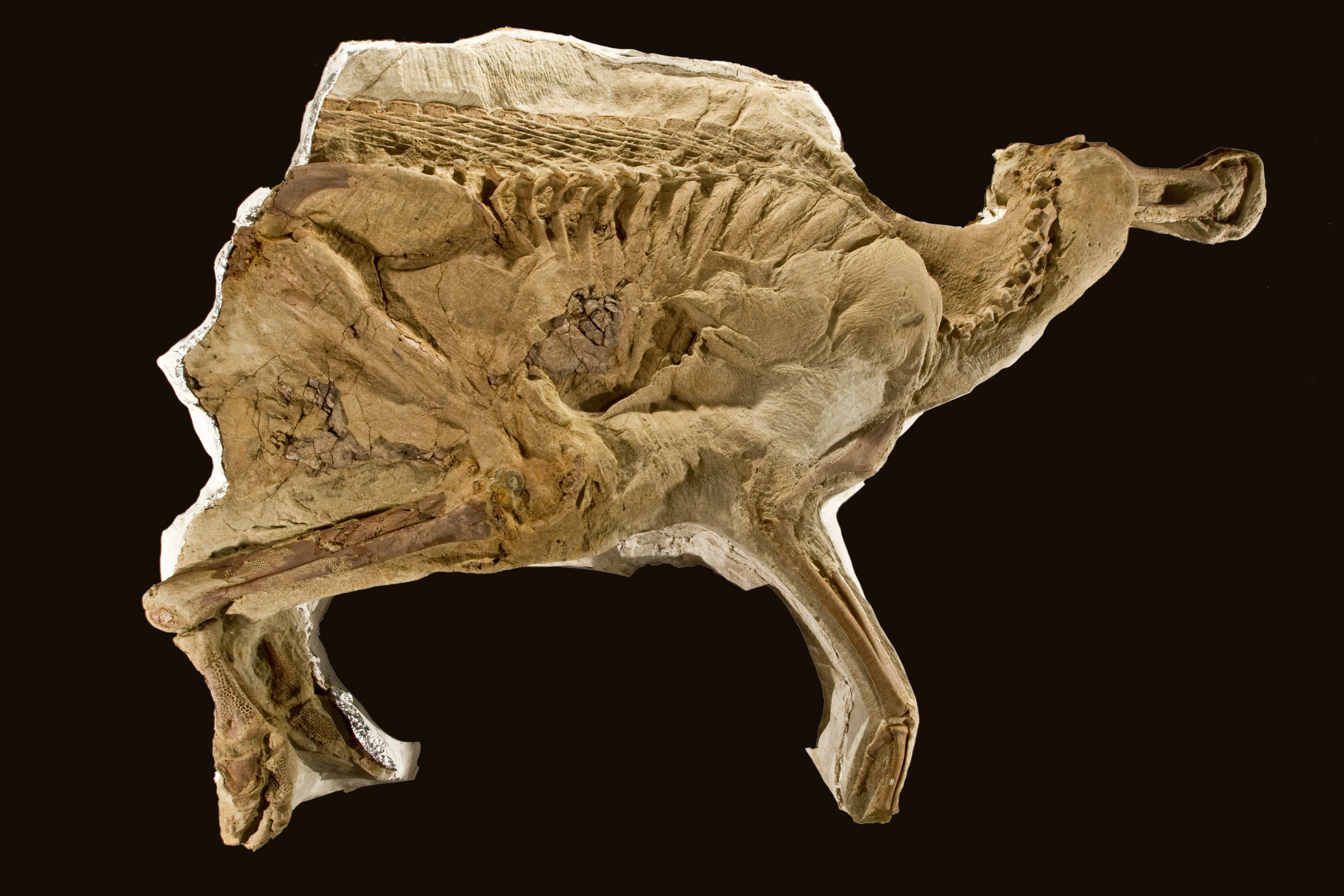
- Fossilized natural mummy of the Late Cretaceous duck-billed dinosaur Brachylophosaurus
  †Brachylophosaurus
  - †Brachylophosaurus canadensis – type locality for species
- †Buccinammonites – type locality for genus
  - †Buccinammonites minimus – type locality for species

== C ==
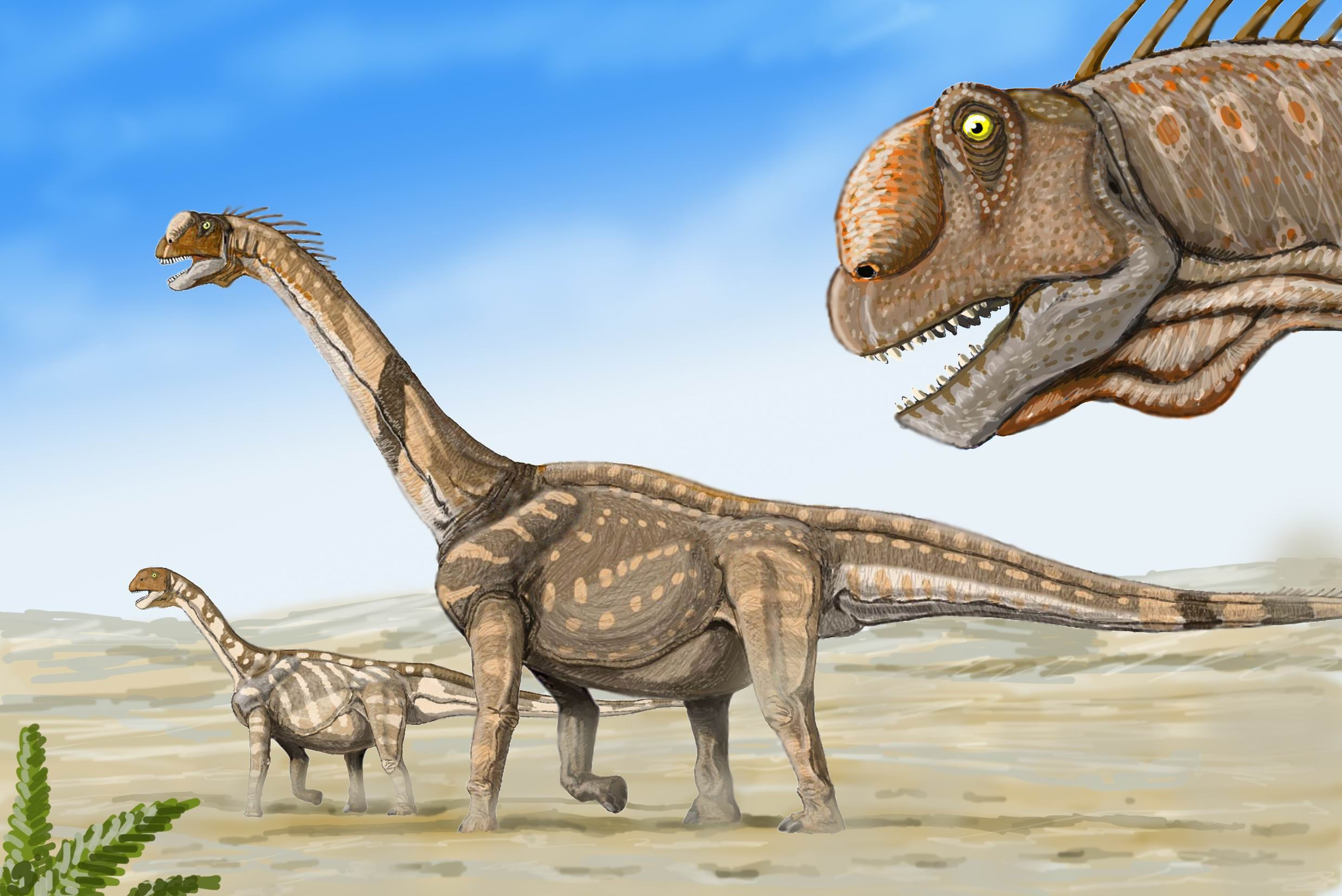
- Life restoration of a herd of the Late Jurassic sauropod dinosaur Camarasaurus
  †Camarasaurus
- Campeloma
- †Camptonectes
  - †Camptonectes platessiformis
  - †Camptonectes stygius
- Carcharias
- †Cardiaster
  - †Cardiaster curtus
- †Carinalestes – type locality for genus
  - †Carinalestes murensis – type locality for species
- †Cedrobaena
  - †Cedrobaena brinkman
- †Celastrophyllum – or unidentified comparable form
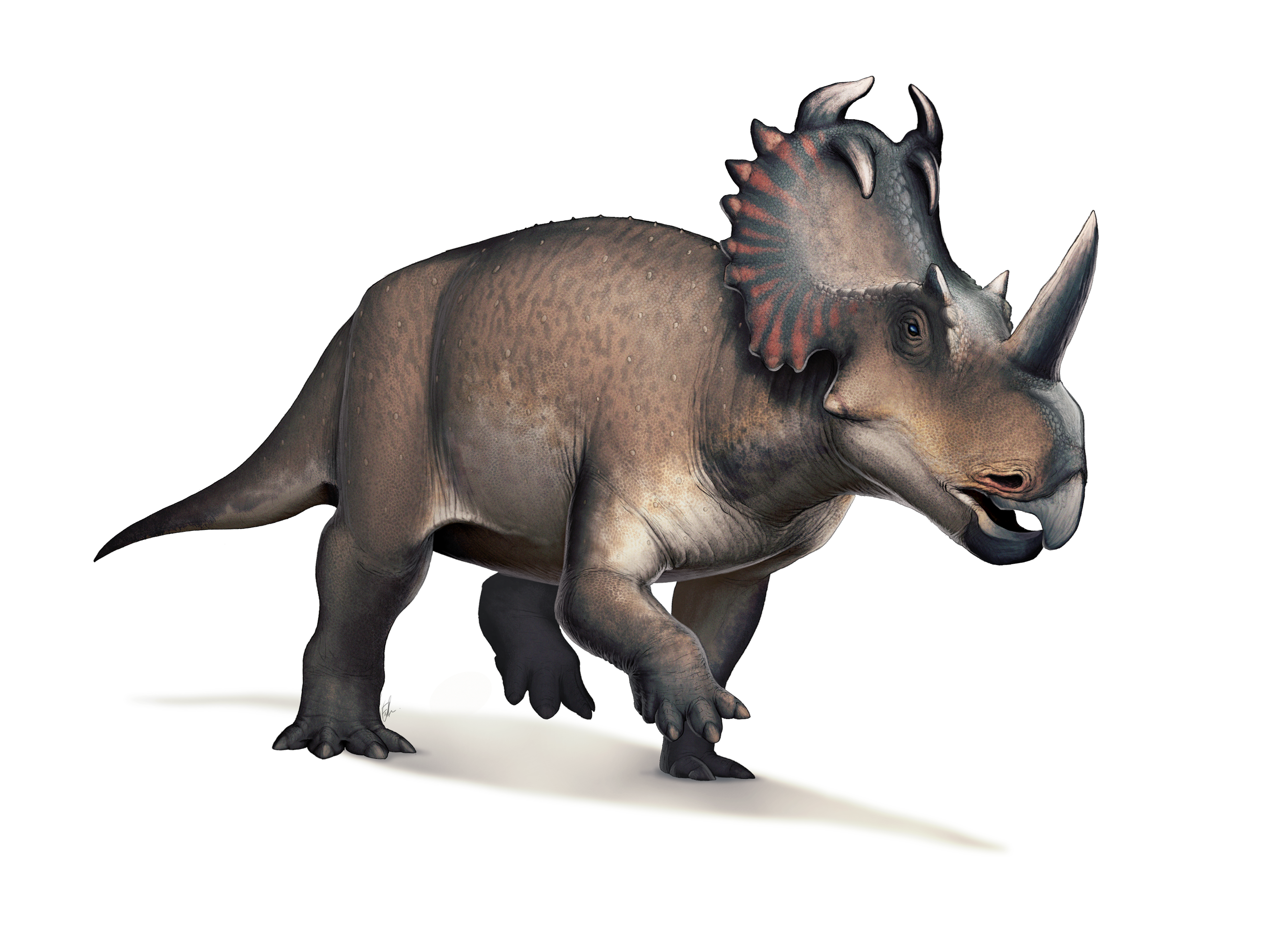
- Life restoration of the Late Cretaceous horned dinosaur Centrosaurus
  †Centrosaurus
- †Cerasinops – type locality for genus
  - †Cerasinops hodgskissi – type locality for species
- †Ceratodus
  - †Ceratodus frazieri
  - †Ceratodus guentheri – or unidentified comparable form
- †Ceratops – type locality for genus
  - †Ceratops montanus – type locality for species
- †Cerberophis – type locality for genus
  - †Cerberophis robustus – type locality for species
- †Cercomya
  - †Cercomya punctata
- †Chamops
  - †Chamops segnis
- †Champsosaurus
  - †Champsosaurus natator
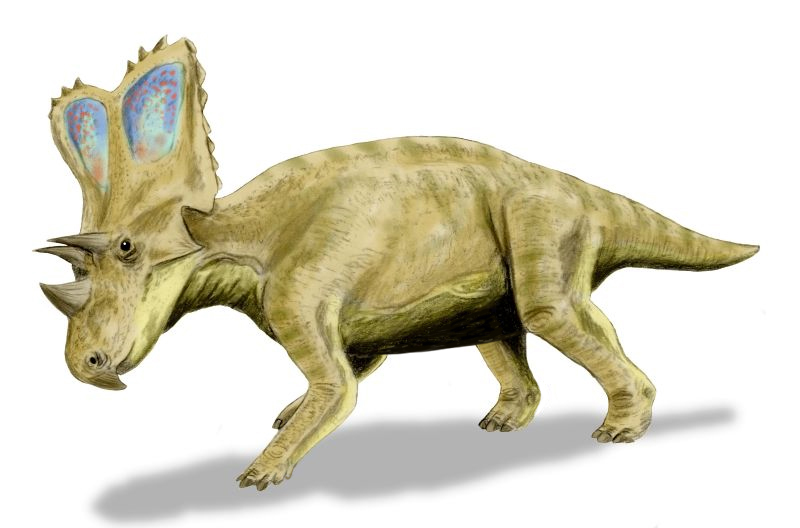
- Life restoration of the Late Cretaceous horned dinosaur Chasmosaurus
  †Chasmosaurus – or unidentified comparable form
- Chiloscyllium
  - †Chiloscyllium missouriensis – type locality for species
- †Chirostenotes
  - †Chirostenotes elegans
- Chlamys
- †Chondroceras
  - †Chondroceras allani – or unidentified comparable form
  - †Chondroceras oblatum
- †Cimexomys
  - †Cimexomys minor
- †Cimolestes
  - †Cimolestes incisus
  - †Cimolestes stirtoni
- †Cimoliasaurus
- †Cimolodon
  - †Cimolodon nitidus
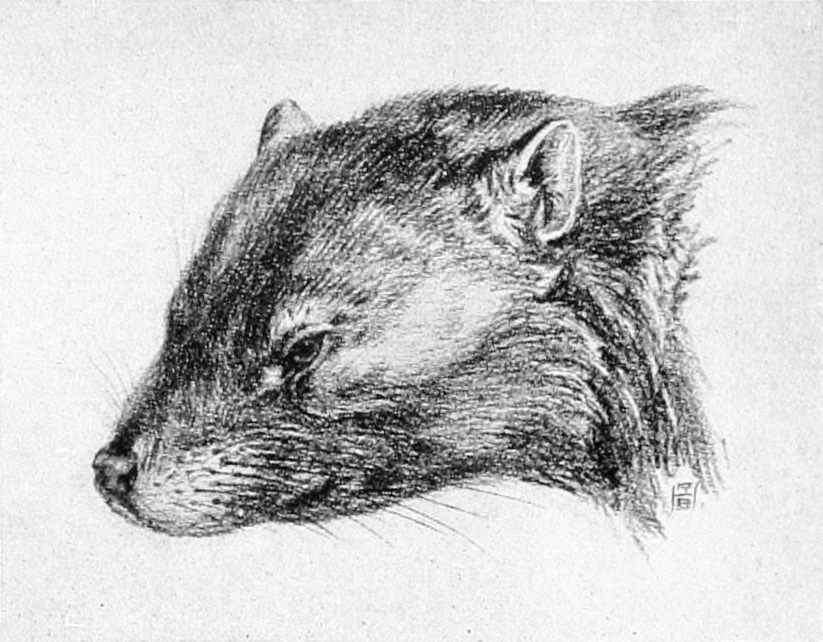
- Life restoration of the face of the Late Cretaceous multituberculate mammal Cimolomys
  †Cimolomys
  - †Cimolomys clarki – type locality for species
  - †Cimolomys gracilis
- †Cimolopteryx
  - †Cimolopteryx maxima
- †Cinnamomoides
- Cladophlebis
  - †Cladophlebis alberta
  - †Cladophlebis constricta
  - †Cladophlebis heterophylla
  - †Cladophlebis inclinata
  - †Cladophlebis oblongifolia
  - †Cladophlebis oerstedi
  - †Cladophlebis virginiensis
- †Claosaurus
- †Claraia
  - †Claraia aurita
  - †Claraia clarai
  - †Claraia mulleri
  - †Claraia stachei
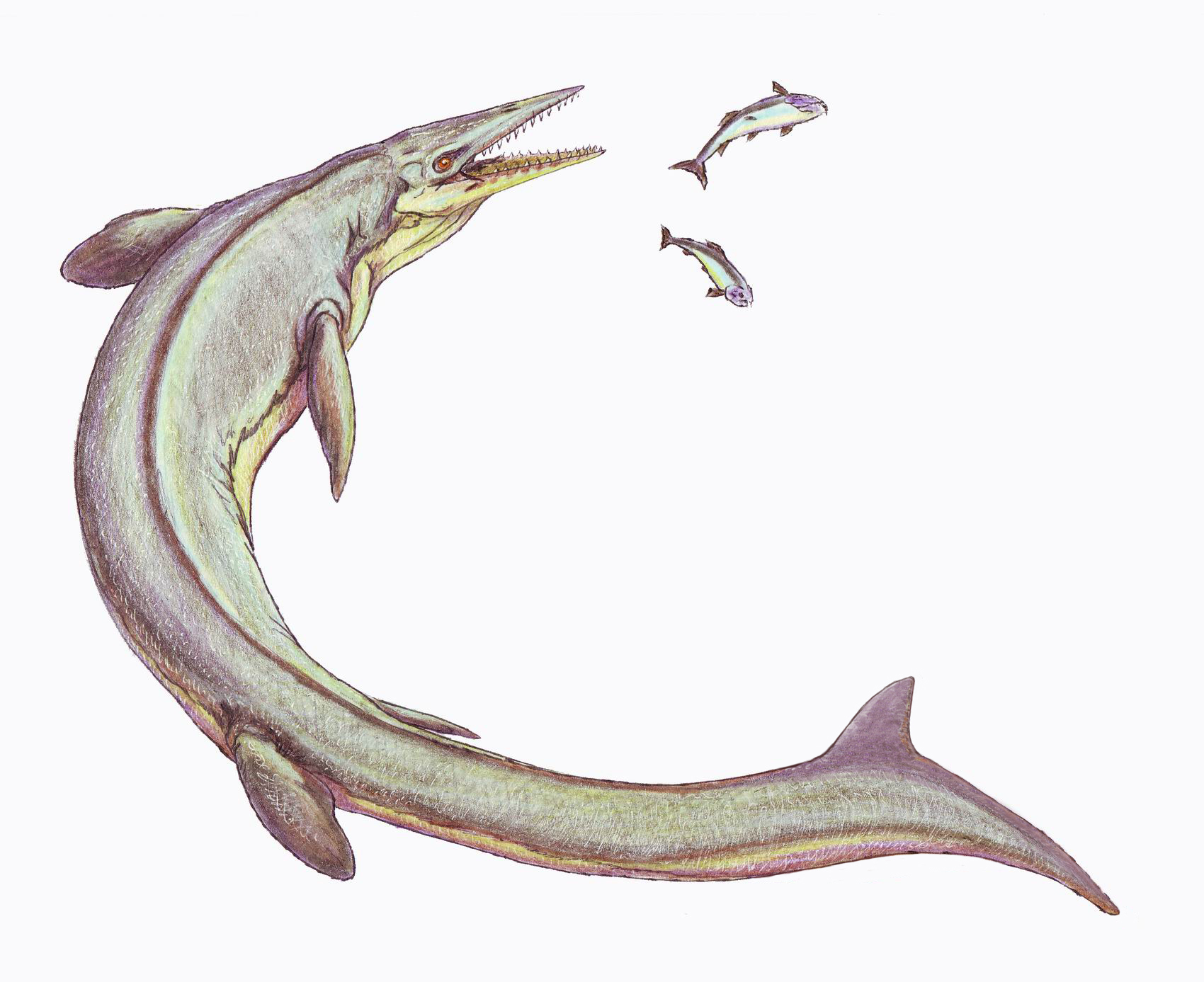
- Life restoration of the Late Cretaceous mosasaurid Clidastes
  †Clidastes
- †Clioscaphites
  - †Clioscaphites vermiformis
- †Cobbanites
- †Coelostylina
- †Colpodontosaurus
  - †Colpodontosaurus cracens
- †Componocancer
  - †Componocancer roberti
- †Compsemys
  - †Compsemys victa
- †Coniophis
  - †Coniophis precedens
- †Coniopteris
  - †Coniopteris bella – or unidentified comparable form
  - †Coniopteris hymenophylloides
  - †Coniopteris simplex
- †Continuoolithus
  - †Continuoolithus canadensis
- †Contogenys – type locality for genus
  - †Contogenys sloani – type locality for species
- †Coriops
  - †Coriops amnicolus
- †Corviconodon
  - †Corviconodon montanensis – type locality for species
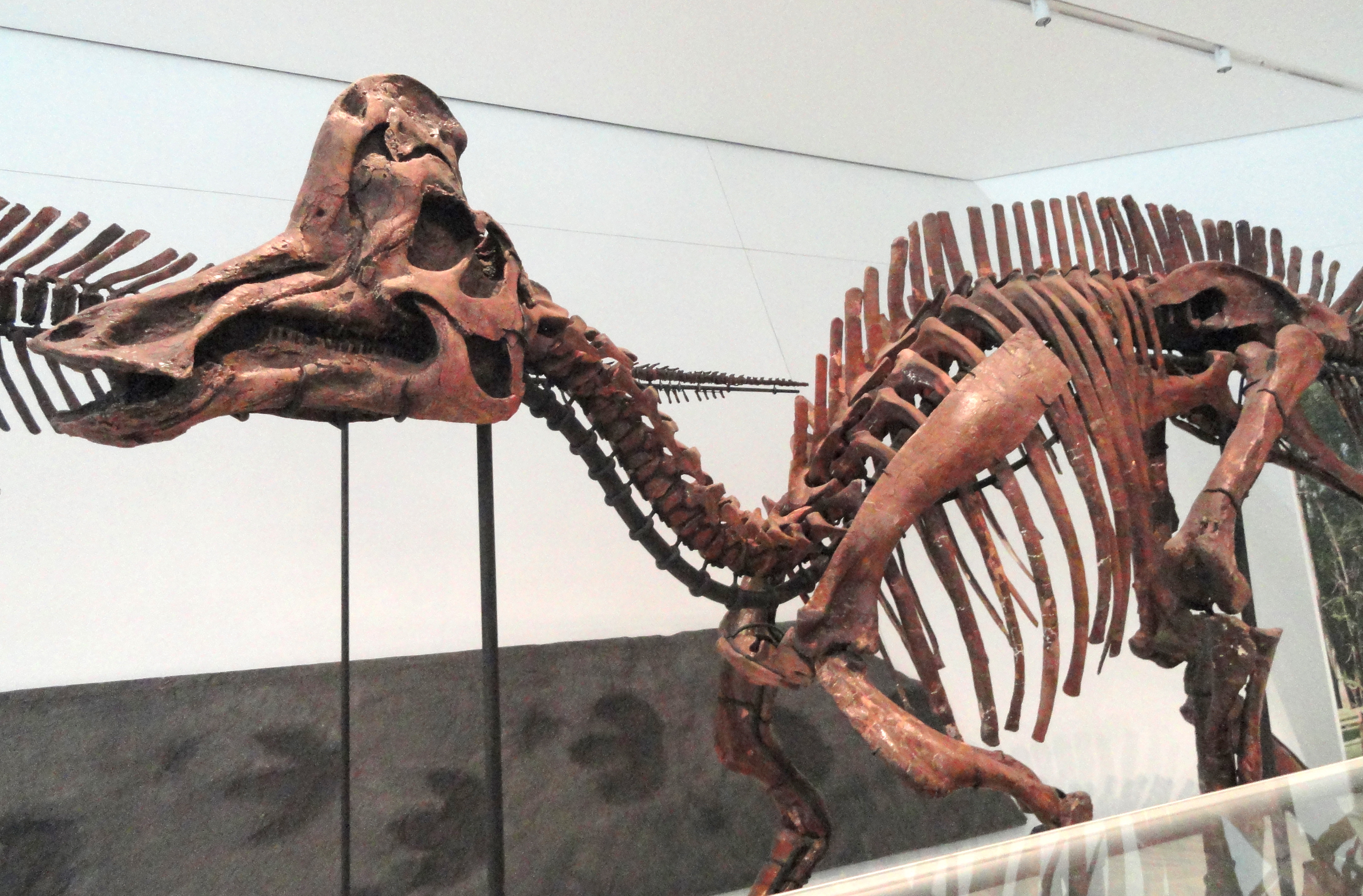
- Mounted fossilized skeleton of the Late Cretaceous duck-billed dinosaur Corythosaurus
  †Corythosaurus
  - †Corythosaurus casuarius
- Crassatella
- †Cremnoceramus
  - †Cremnoceramus deformis
- †Cretolamna
  - †Cretolamna appendiculata
- †Cretorectolobus – type locality for genus
  - †Cretorectolobus olsoni – type locality for species
- †Crocodilus
  - †Crocodilus humilis
- †Cryptometoicoceras
  - †Cryptometoicoceras mite
- Cucullaea
  - †Cucullaea haguei
  - †Cucullaea rockymontana
- †Cyathidites
  - †Cyathidites minor
- †Cycadolepis
- †Cycadopites
  - †Cycadopites fragilis
- †Cyclurus
  - †Cyclurus fragosus

== D ==
- †Daspletosaurus
  - †Daspletosaurus horneri – type locality for species
- †Deinodon – type locality for genus
  - †Deinodon horridus – type locality for species
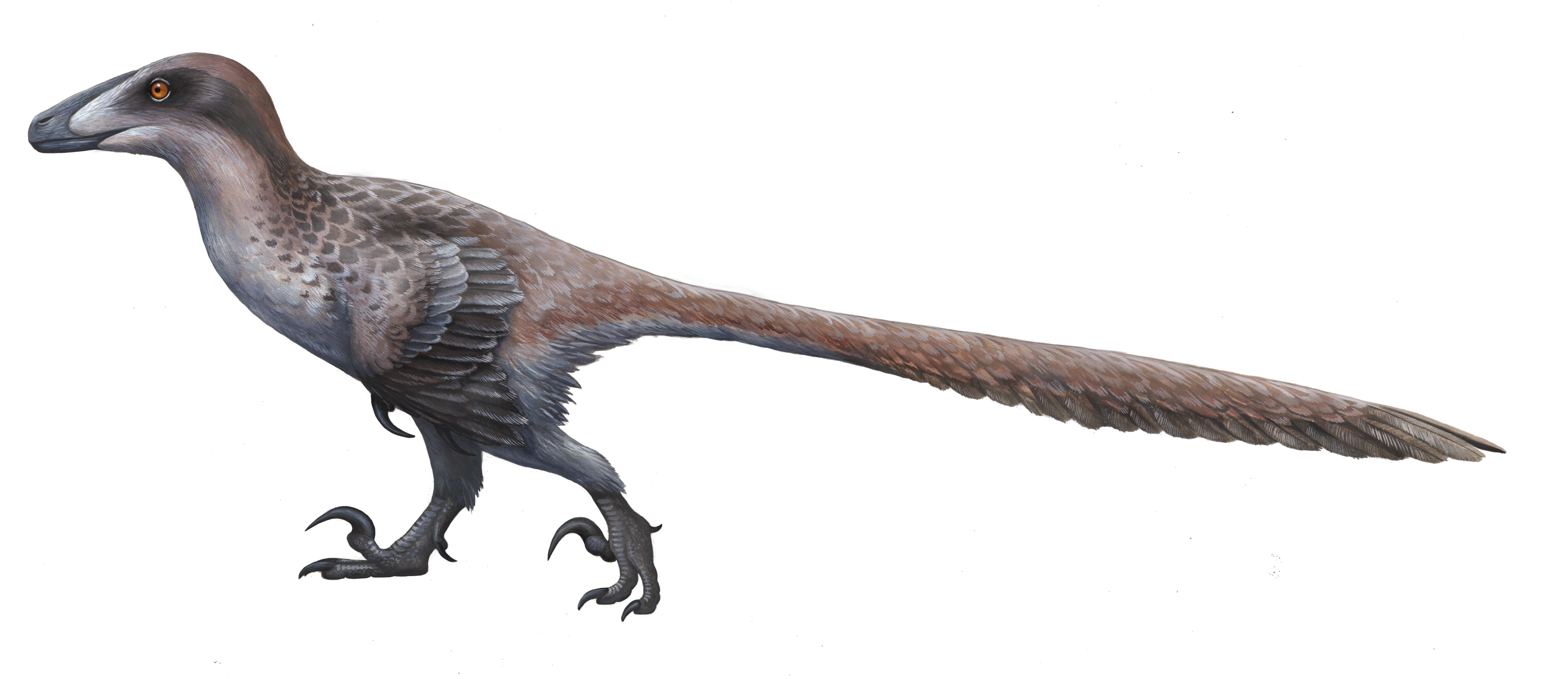
- Life restoration of the Early Cretaceous dromaeosaur ("raptor") Deinonychus
  †Deinonychus – type locality for genus
  - †Deinonychus antirrhopus – type locality for species
- †Deinosuchus – type locality for genus
  - †Deinosuchus rugosus – type locality for species
- †Deltoidospora
  - †Deltoidospora cascadensis – type locality for species
  - †Deltoidospora diaphana
  - †Deltoidospora hallii – type locality for species
- Dentalium
- †Derrisemys
  - †Derrisemys sterea
- †Diclonius
- †Dictyothykalos
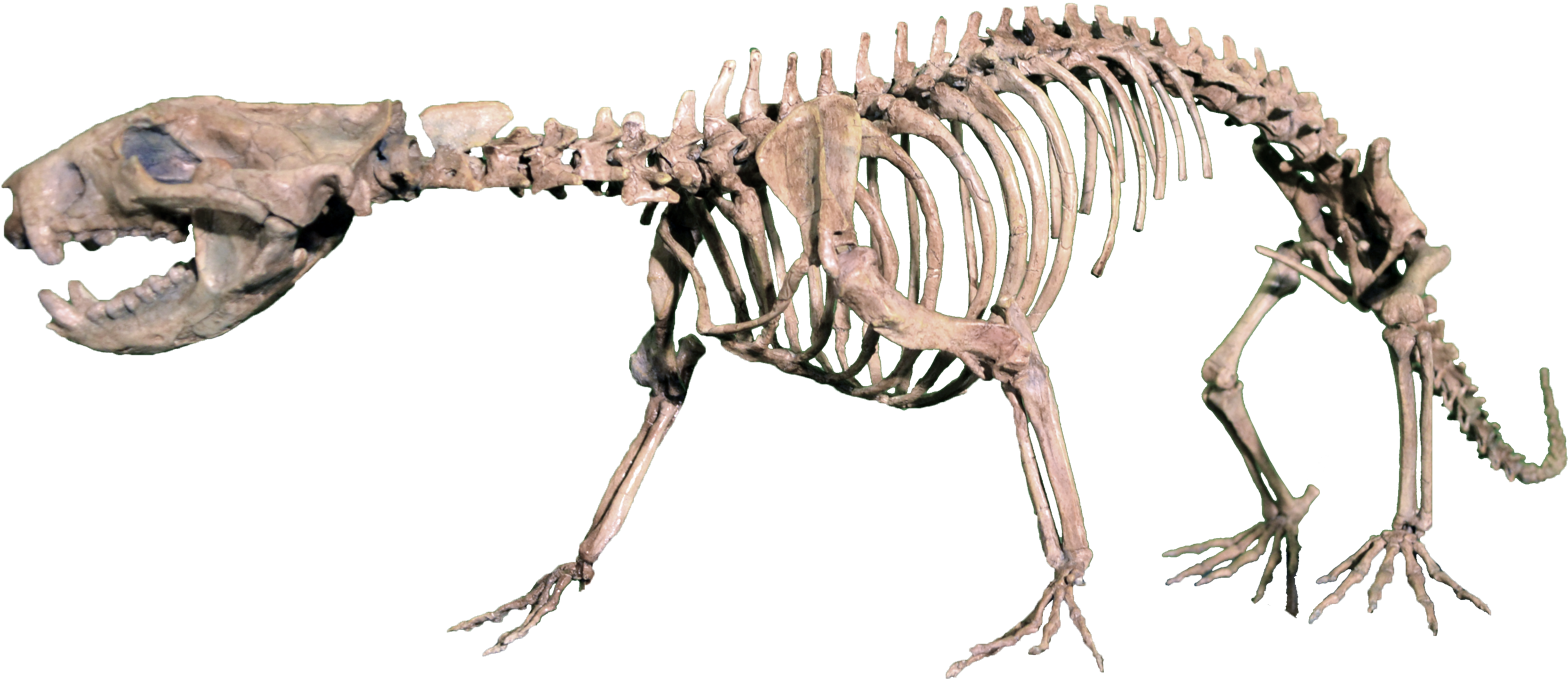
- Mounted fossilized skeleton of the Late Cretaceous marsupial relative Didelphodon
  †Didelphodon
  - †Didelphodon vorax
- †Didymoceras
  - †Didymoceras cheyennense
  - †Didymoceras nebrascense
  - †Didymoceras stevensoni
- †Diettertia
  - †Diettertia montanensis
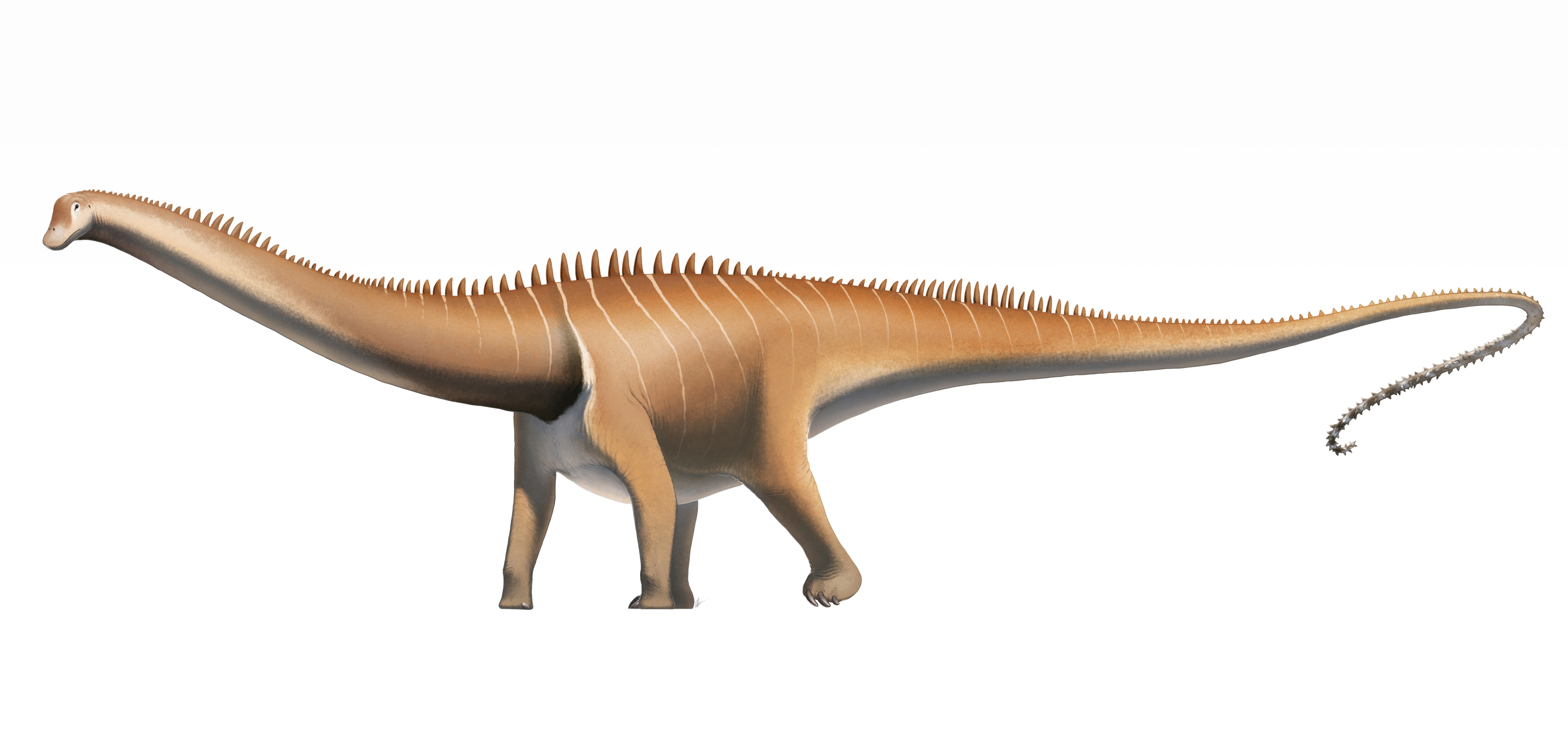
- Life restoration of the Late Jurassic long-necked dinosaur Diplodocus
  †Diplodocus
- †Doratodon – or unidentified comparable form
- †Dromaeosaurus
  - †Dromaeosaurus albertensis
- †Dryophyllum – report made of unidentified related form or using admittedly obsolete nomenclature
  - †Dryophyllum subfalcatum
- †Dunveganoceras
  - †Dunveganoceras albertense
  - †Dunveganoceras parvum – type locality for species
  - †Dunveganoceras pondi
- †Dyadonapites
  - †Dyadonapites reticulatus
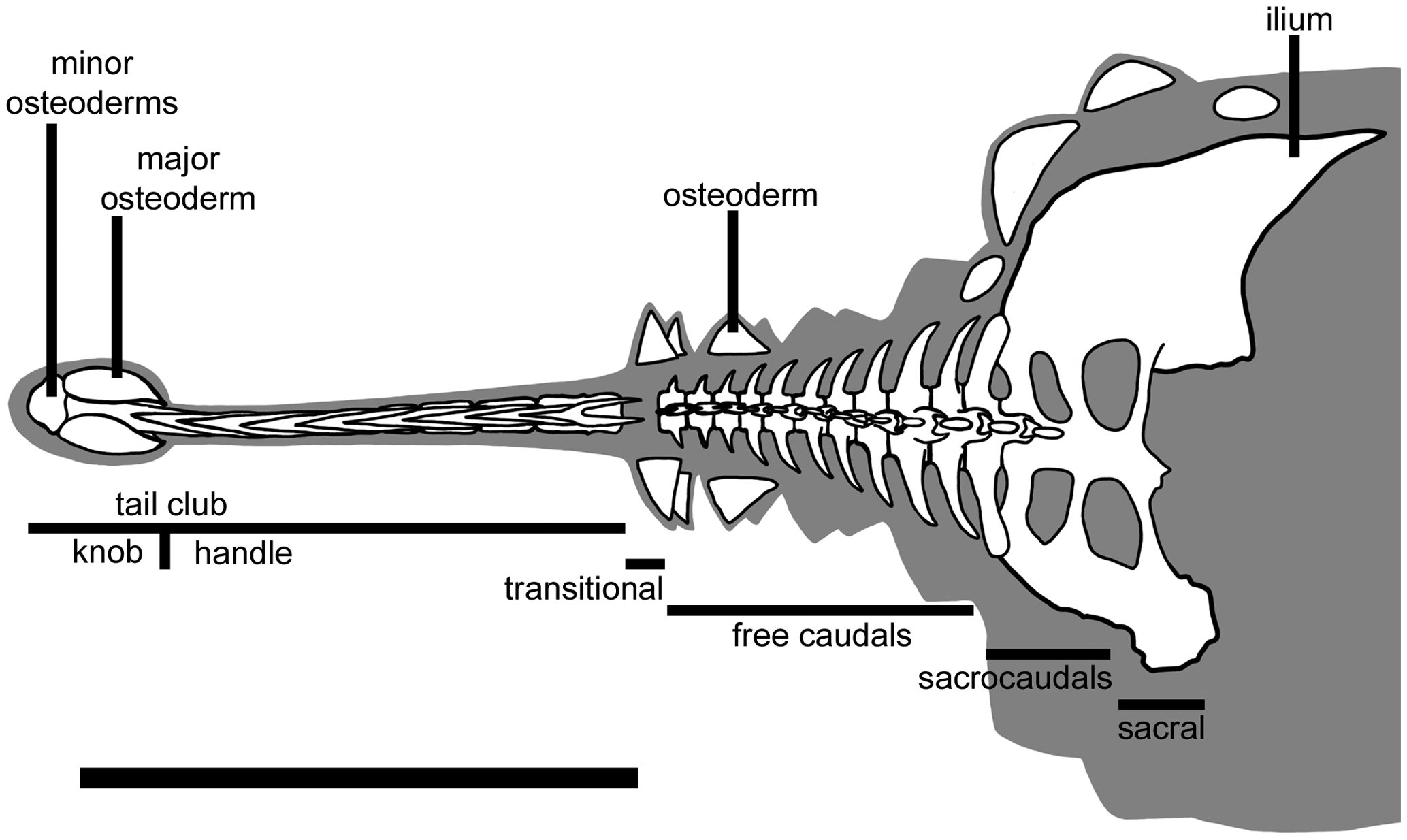
- Illustration of the fossilized pelvis and tail of the Late Cretaceous armored dinosaur Dyoplosaurus
  †Dyoplosaurus
  - †Dyoplosaurus acutosquameus

== E ==
- †Echinatisporis
- †Ectocentrocristus
  - †Ectocentrocristus foxi – type locality for species
- †Ectoconodon
  - †Ectoconodon montanensis – type locality for species
- †Edgarosaurus
  - †Edgarosaurus muddi
- †Edmontonia
  - †Edmontonia longiceps
  - †Edmontonia rugosidens – type locality for species
- †Edmontosaurus
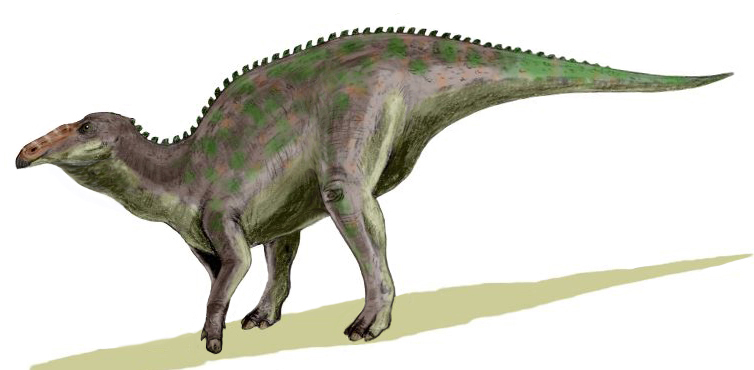
  - Life restoration of the Late Cretaceous duck-billed dinosaur Edmontosaurus annectens
    †Edmontosaurus annectens
- †Einiosaurus – type locality for genus
  - †Einiosaurus procurvicornis – type locality for species
- †Elasmodus
  - †Elasmodus greenoughi – or unidentified comparable form
- †Emarginachelys – type locality for genus
  - †Emarginachelys cretacea – type locality for species
- †Entolioides
  - †Entolioides utahensis
- †Eodelphis
- †Eopelobates – or unidentified comparable form
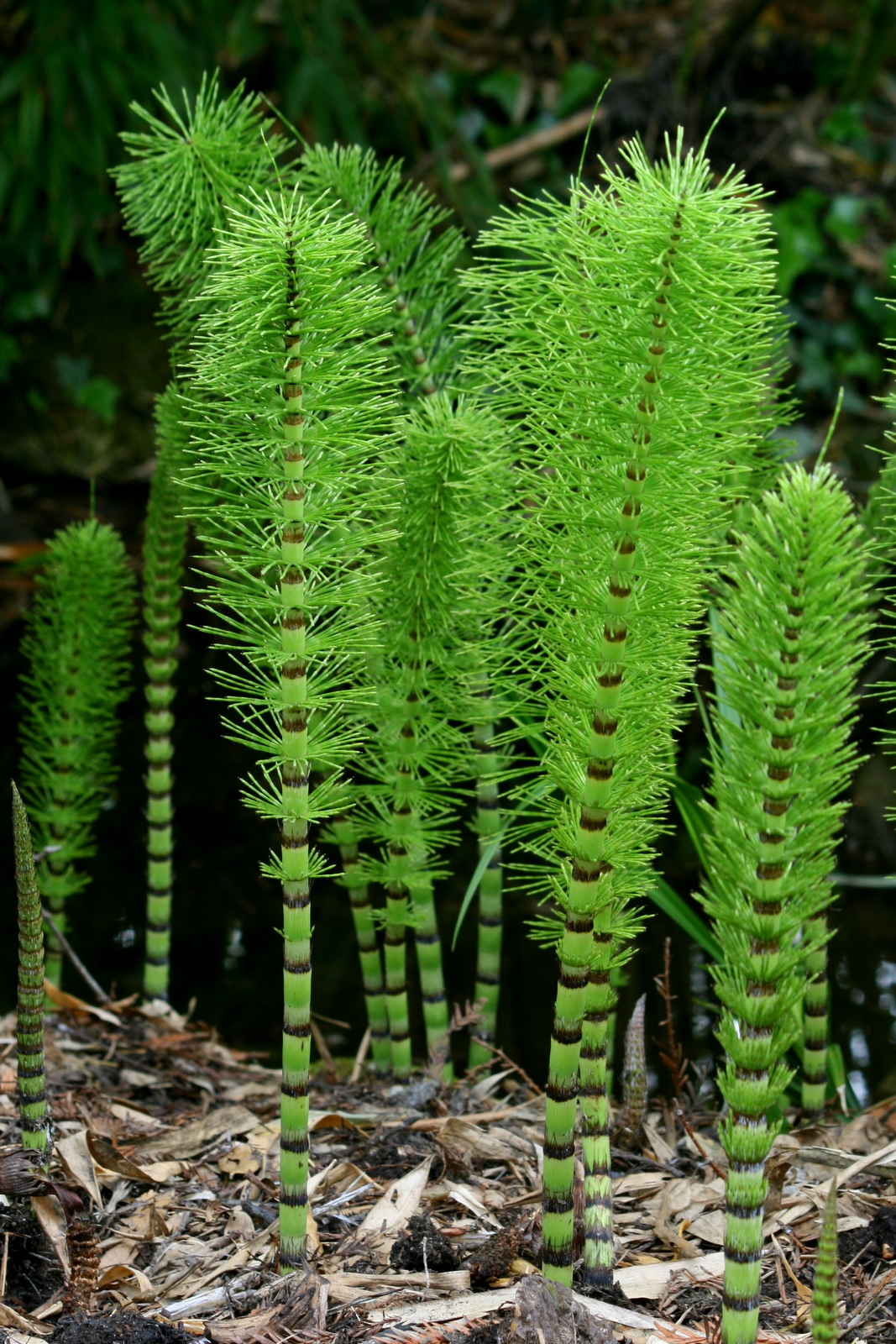
- A living Equisetum, or horsetail
  †Equisetum
  - †Equisetum cascadensis – type locality for species
  - †Equisetum laterale
  - †Equisetum montanensis
- †Erdtmanipollis
  - †Erdtmanipollis procumbentiformis
- †Essonodon – type locality for genus
  - †Essonodon browni – type locality for species
- †Eubaena
  - †Eubaena cephalica
- †Eucrossorhinus
  - †Eucrossorhinus microcuspidatus – type locality for species
- †Eumorphotis
  - †Eumorphotis amplicostata – type locality for species
  - †Eumorphotis ericius – or unidentified comparable form
  - †Eumorphotis multiformis
- †Euomphaloceras
  - †Euomphaloceras septemseriatum
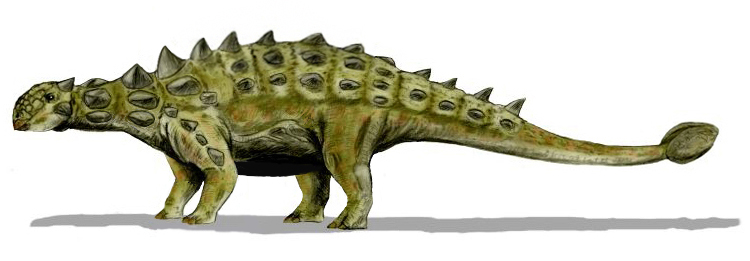
- Life restoration of the Late Cretaceous armored dinosaur Euoplocephalus
  †Euoplocephalus
  - †Euoplocephalus tutus
- †Eutrephoceras
  - †Eutrephoceras montanensis – type locality for species
- †Exiteloceras
  - †Exiteloceras jenneyi
- †Exogyra
  - †Exogyra columbella
- †Exostinus
  - †Exostinus lancensis

== F ==
- †Falepetrus
  - †Falepetrus barwini
- Ficus – or unidentified comparable form
  - †Ficus ovatifolia
- †Fletcherithyris – report made of unidentified related form or using admittedly obsolete nomenclature
  - †Fletcherithyris margaritovi
- †Foraminisporis
  - †Foraminisporis undulates

== G ==
- †Gastopoda
- †Gervillia
  - †Gervillia ussurica – or unidentified comparable form
- †Gilmoremys
  - †Gilmoremys lancensis
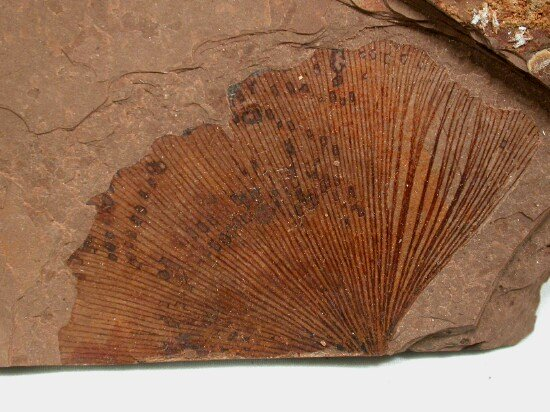
- Fossilized leaf of the Permian-modern tree Ginkgo
  Ginkgo
  - †Ginkgo pluripartita
- †Ginkgoites
  - †Ginkgoites cascadensis
  - †Ginkgoites pluripartita
- †Glasbius
  - †Glasbius twitchelli – type locality for species
- †Glishades – type locality for genus
  - †Glishades ericksoni – type locality for species
- †Glyptops
  - †Glyptops pervicax – type locality for species
- Glyptostrobus – or unidentified comparable form
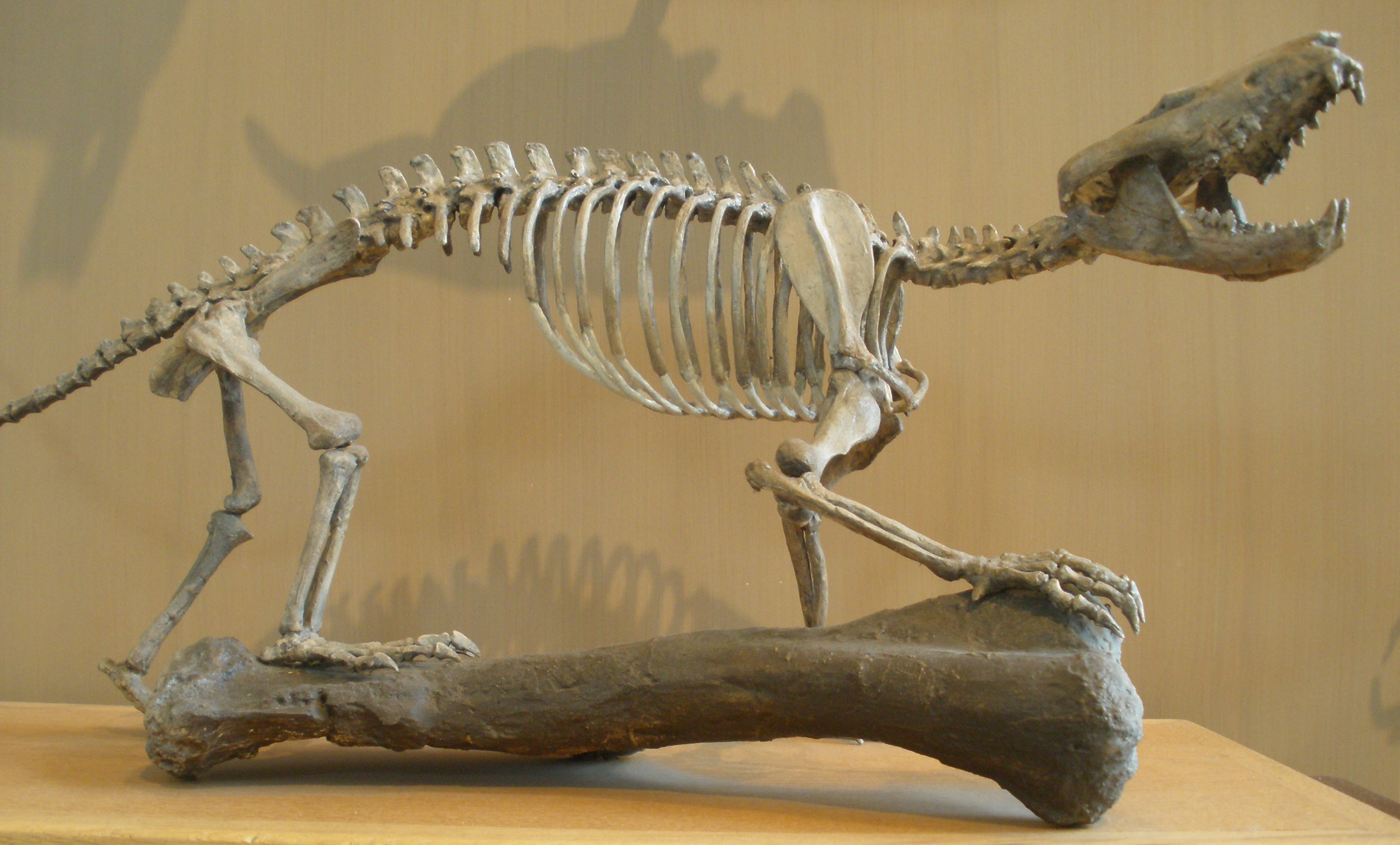
- Mounted fossilized skeleton of the Middle Jurassic-Late Cretaceous mammal Gobiconodon
  †Gobiconodon – type locality for genus
  - †Gobiconodon ostromi – type locality for species
- †Goniobasis
  - †Goniobasis subtortuosa
- †Gorgosaurus
  - †Gorgosaurus libratus – type locality for species
- †Grammatodon
- †Grewipollenites
  - †Grewipollenites radiatus
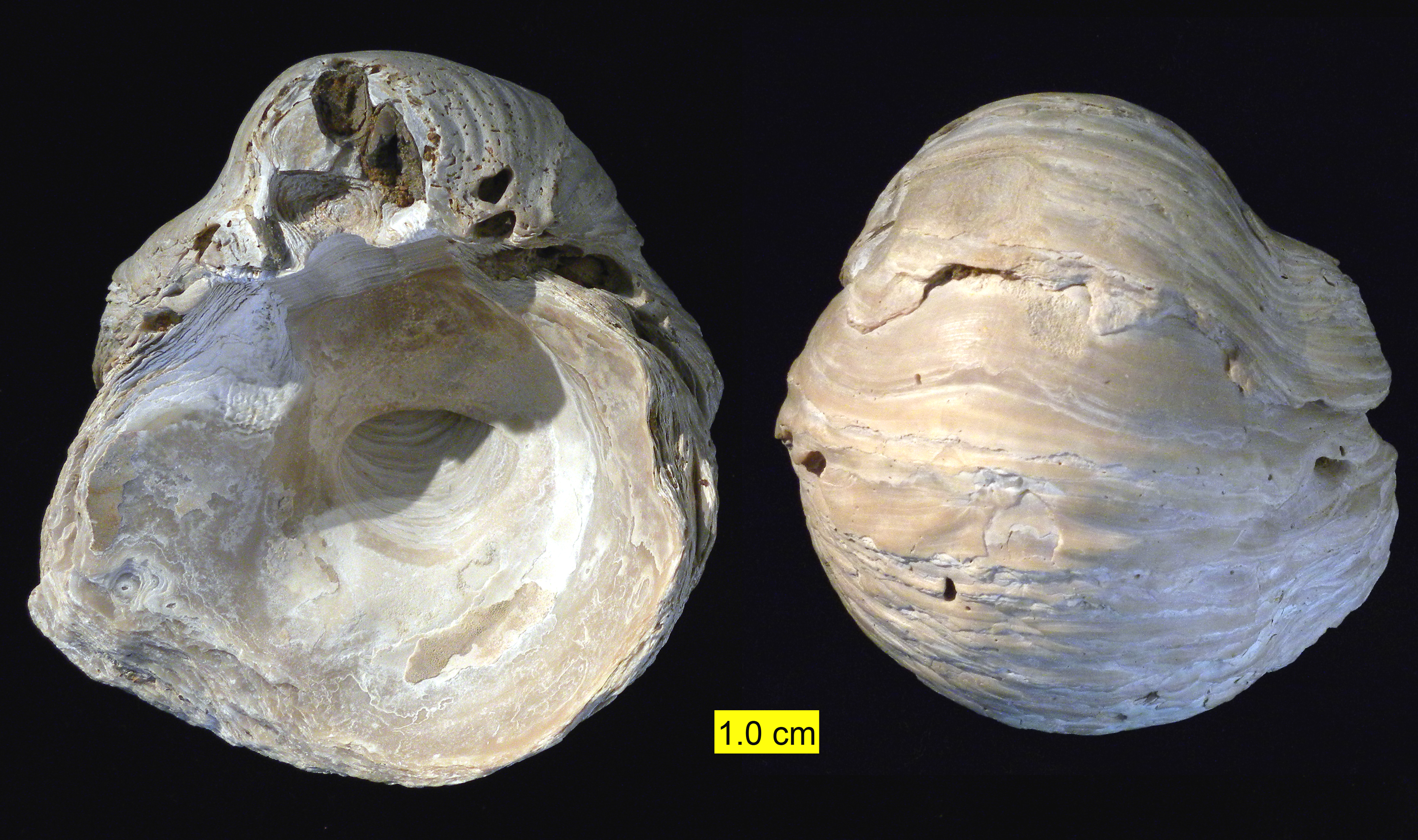
- Interior and exterior of a fossilized shell of the Late Triassic-Eocene marine bivalve Gryphaea
  †Gryphaea
  - †Gryphaea – type locality for species – informal
  - †Gryphaea impressimarginata
- †Gryposaurus
  - †Gryposaurus latidens – type locality for species
  - †Gryposaurus notabilis
- †Gypsonictops
  - †Gypsonictops hypoconus
  - †Gypsonictops illuminatus
  - †Gypsonictops lewisi – type locality for species
- Gyrodes
  - †Gyrodes conradi

== H ==
- †Habrosaurus
  - †Habrosaurus dilatus
- †Hadrosaurus
  - †Hadrosaurus breviceps – type locality for species
  - †Hadrosaurus paucidens – type locality for species
- †Hamites
  - †Hamites cimarronensis
- †Haptosphenus
  - †Haptosphenus placodon
- †Hausmannia
  - †Hausmannia fisheri
  - †Hausmannia montanensis
- †Helopanoplia
  - †Helopanoplia distincta
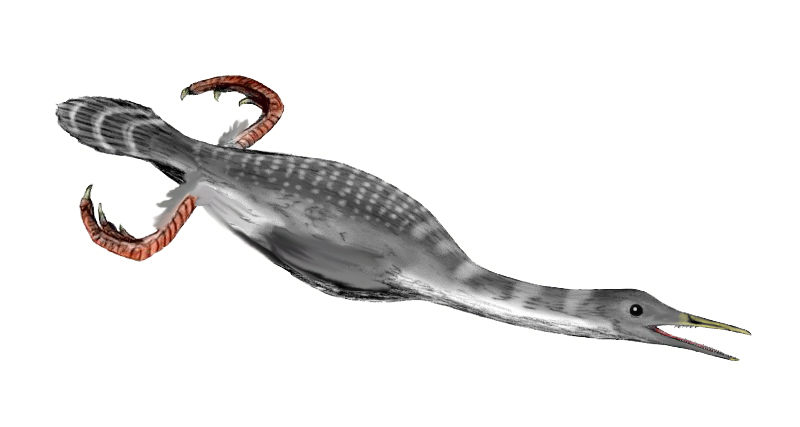
- Life restoration of the Late Cretaceous toothed bird Hesperornis
  †Hesperornis
  - †Hesperornis montana – type locality for species
- †Heteropecten – tentative report
- †Holocrinus
- †Hoploscaphites
  - †Hoploscaphites macer – type locality for species
- †Hummelichelys
  - †Hummelichelys beecheri
  - †Hummelichelys foveatus – type locality for species
- †Hybodus
  - †Hybodus montanensis – type locality for species
  - †Hybodus storeri – type locality for species
- †Hypacrosaurus
  - †Hypacrosaurus stebingeri – type locality for species
- †Hypotodus
  - †Hypotodus grandis – type locality for species

== I ==
- †Idiohamites
  - †Idiohamites bispinosus – type locality for species
  - †Idiohamites pulchellus – type locality for species
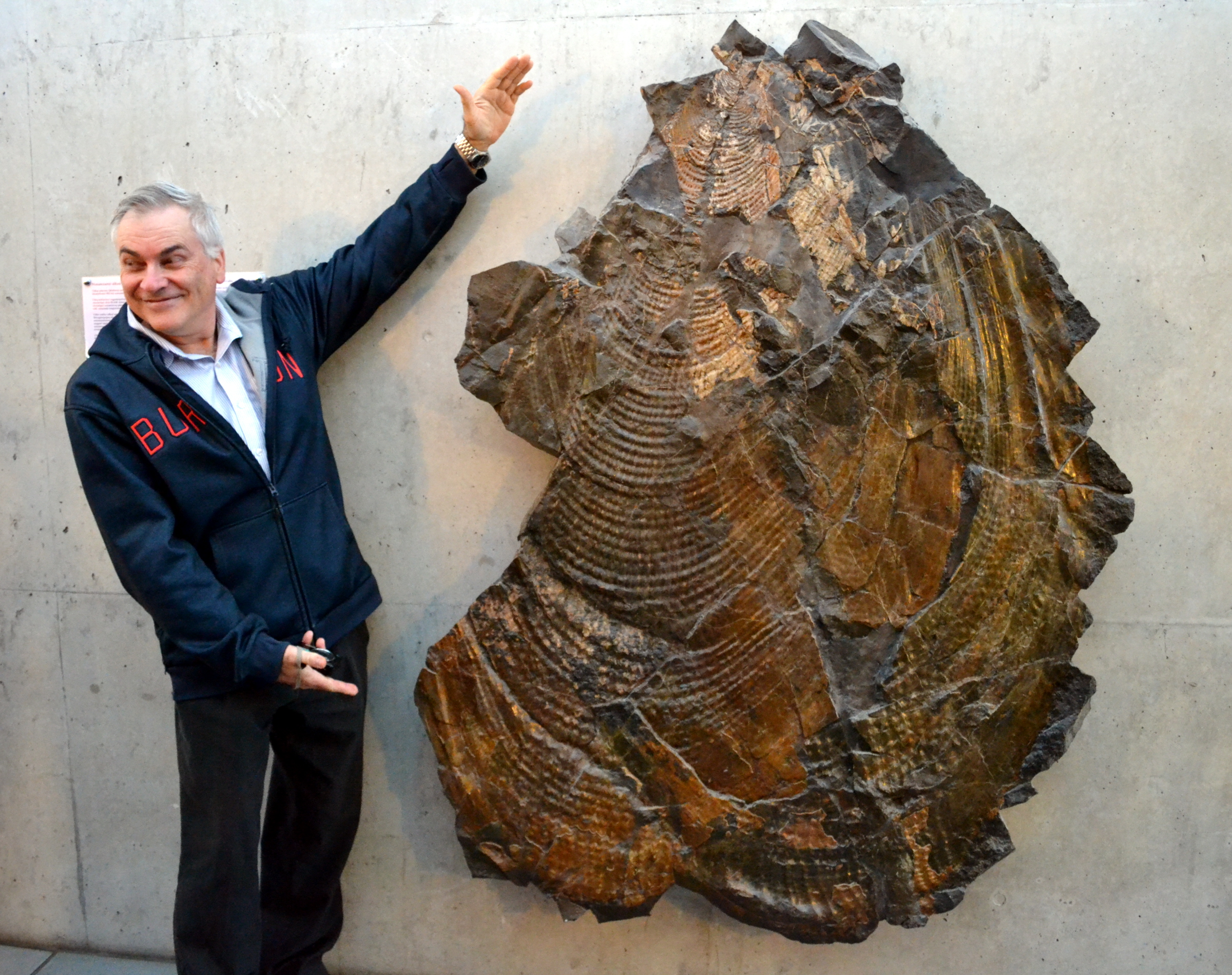
- Fossilized shell of the Early Jurassic-Late Cretaceous marine bivalve Inoceramus with a human indicating its size
  †Inoceramus
  - †Inoceramus arnoldi
  - †Inoceramus canaliculatus
  - †Inoceramus cancellatus
  - †Inoceramus cardissoides - or unidentified loosely related form
  - †Inoceramus cordiformis – or unidentified comparable form
  - †Inoceramus erectus
  - †Inoceramus fragilis – or unidentified related form
  - †Inoceramus frechi – or unidentified comparable form
  - †Inoceramus gibbosus
  - †Inoceramus gilli – type locality for species
  - †Inoceramus glacierensis – type locality for species
  - †Inoceramus koeneni
  - †Inoceramus latisulcatus – or unidentified comparable form
  - †Inoceramus lesginensis
  - †Inoceramus lingua – or unidentified comparable form
  - †Inoceramus lundbreckensis
  - †Inoceramus sokolovi – type locality for species
  - †Inoceramus undabundus
  - †Inoceramus walterdorfensis
- †Iqualadelphis
  - †Iqualadelphis lactea
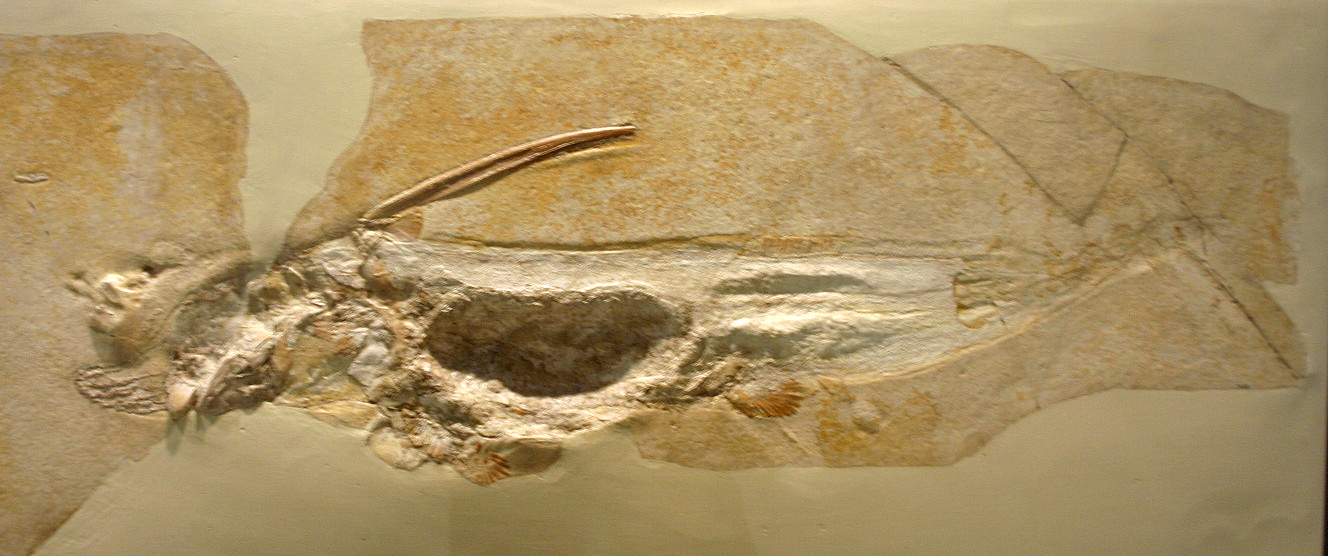
- Fossilized skeleton of the Middle Jurassic-Miocene Chimaera relative Ischyodus
  †Ischyodus
  - †Ischyodus bifurcatus
- †Ischyrhiza
  - †Ischyrhiza avonicola
  - †Ischyrhiza mira
- †Isocyprina – or unidentified comparable form
  - †Isocyprina iddingsi

== J ==
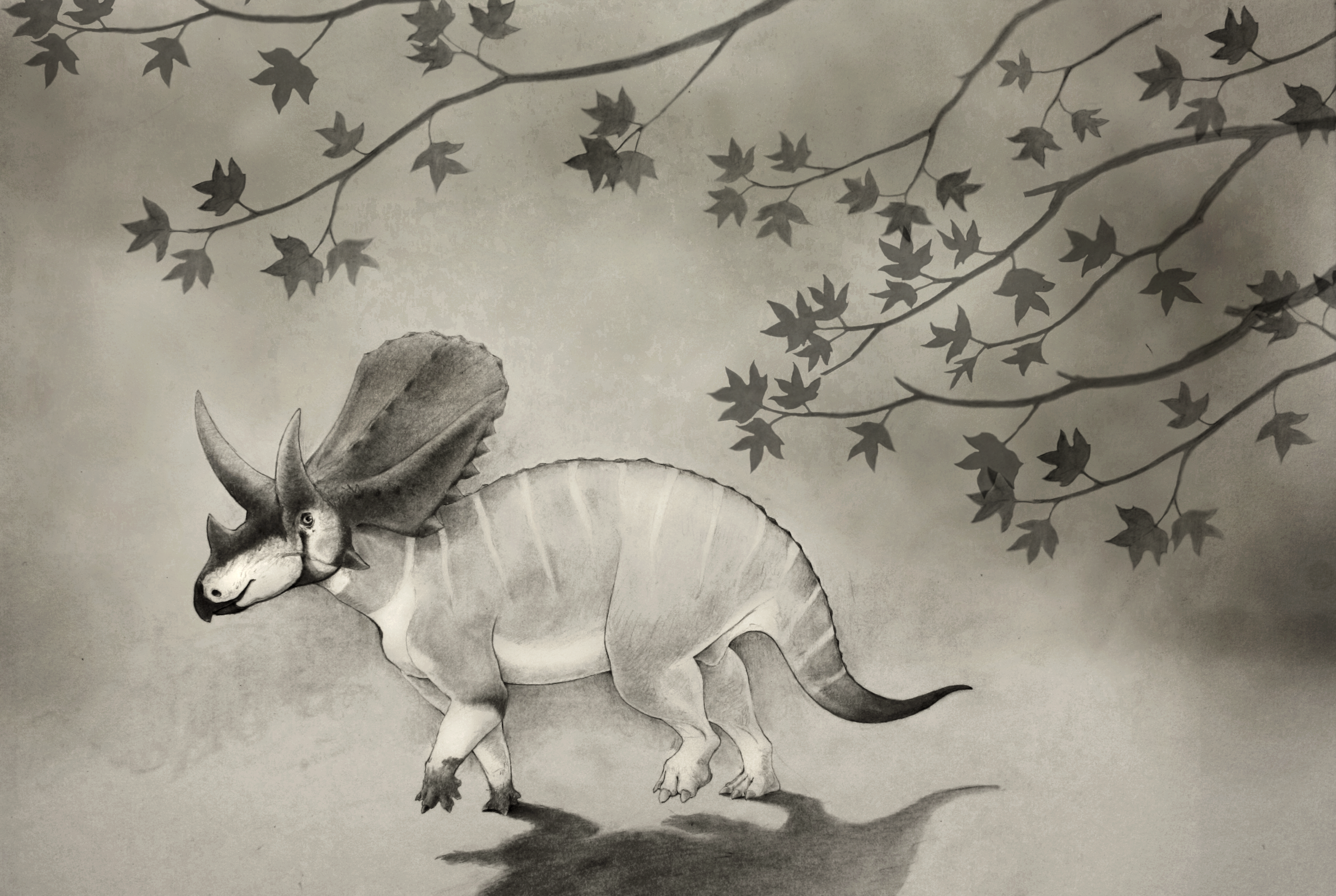
- Life restoration of the Late Cretaceous horned dinosaur Judiceratops
  †Judiceratops – type locality for genus
  - †Judiceratops tigris – type locality for species
- †Judithemys
  - †Judithemys backmani

== K ==
- †Kastanoceras – type locality for genus
  - †Kastanoceras spiniger – type locality for species
- †Klukia
  - †Klukia canadensis
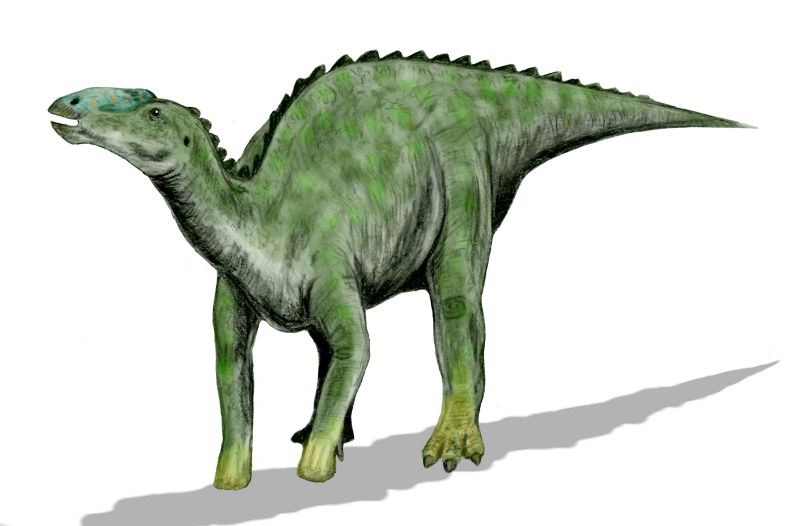
- Life restoration of the Late Cretaceous duck-billed dinosaur Kritosaurus
  †Kritosaurus
  - †Kritosaurus breviceps – or unidentified comparable form
- †Krokolithes

== L ==
- †Labrodioctes – type locality for genus
  - †Labrodioctes montanensis – type locality for species
- †Laevigatosporites
  - †Laevigatosporites haardtii
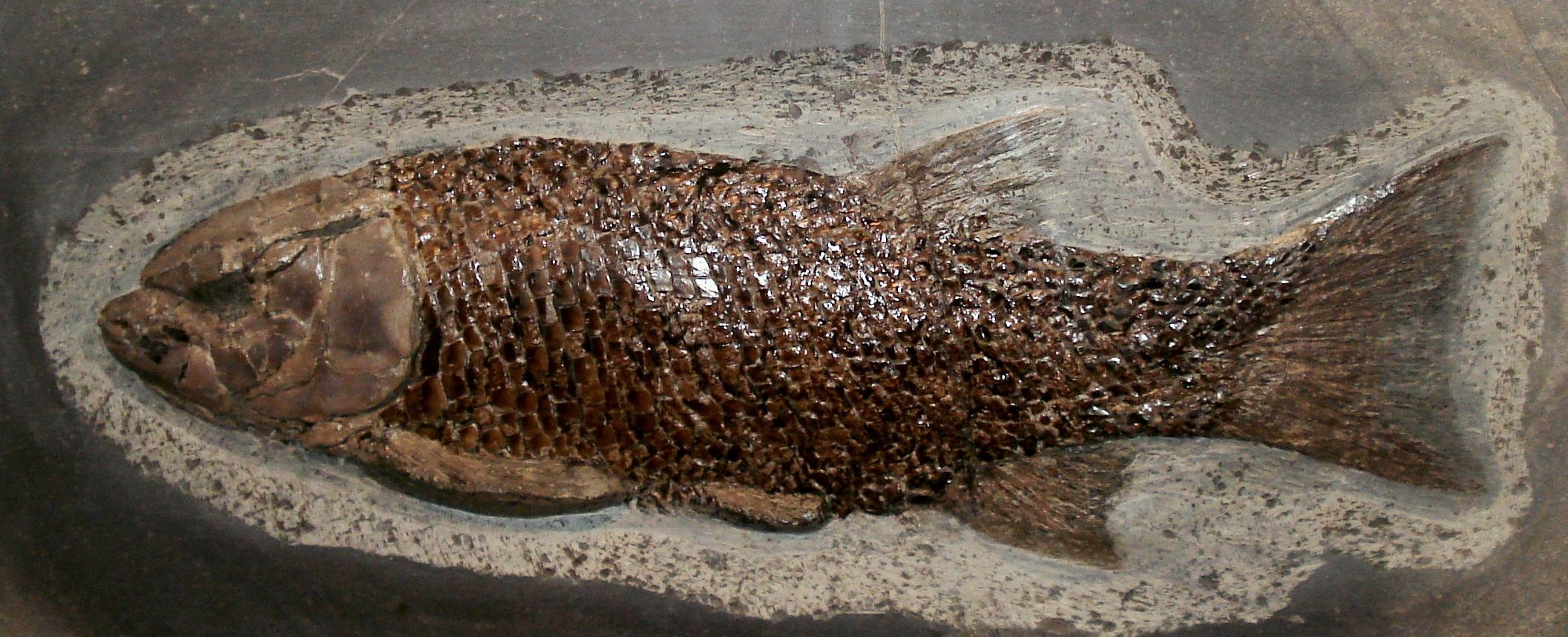
- Fossilized skeleton of the Early Jurassic-Late Cretaceous bony fish Lepidotes
  †Lepidotes
  - †Lepidotes haydeni – type locality for species
  - †Lepidotes occidentalis – type locality for species
- †Lepismatina – report made of unidentified related form or using admittedly obsolete nomenclature
  - †Lepismatina mansfieldi
- Lepisosteus
  - †Lepisosteus occidentalis
- †Leptalestes
  - †Leptalestes cooki
  - †Leptalestes krejcii
  - †Leptalestes prokrejcii
  - †Leptalestes toevsi – type locality for species
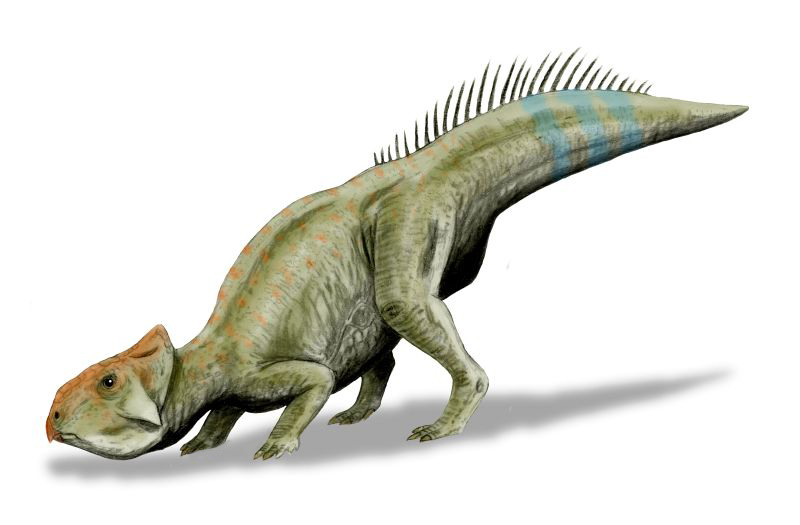
- Life restoration of the Late Cretaceous primitive horned dinosaur Leptoceratops
  †Leptoceratops
  - †Leptoceratops gracilis
- †Leptochamops
  - †Leptochamops denticulatus
- †Leptochondria
  - †Leptochondria occidanea
- †Leptopecopites
  - †Leptopecopites pocockii
- †Leptorhynchos – tentative report
- †Lesterwardia – type locality for genus
  - †Lesterwardia palustris – type locality for species
- †Liliacidites
- †Lingula
- †Lingularia
  - †Lingularia borealis
- †Lioplacodes
  - †Lioplacodes judithensis
  - †Lioplacodes williamsi
- †Liostrea
  - †Liostrea strigilecula
- †Lisserpeton – type locality for genus
  - †Lisserpeton atlantes
  - †Lisserpeton bairdi – type locality for species
- †Lonchidion
  - †Lonchidion selachos
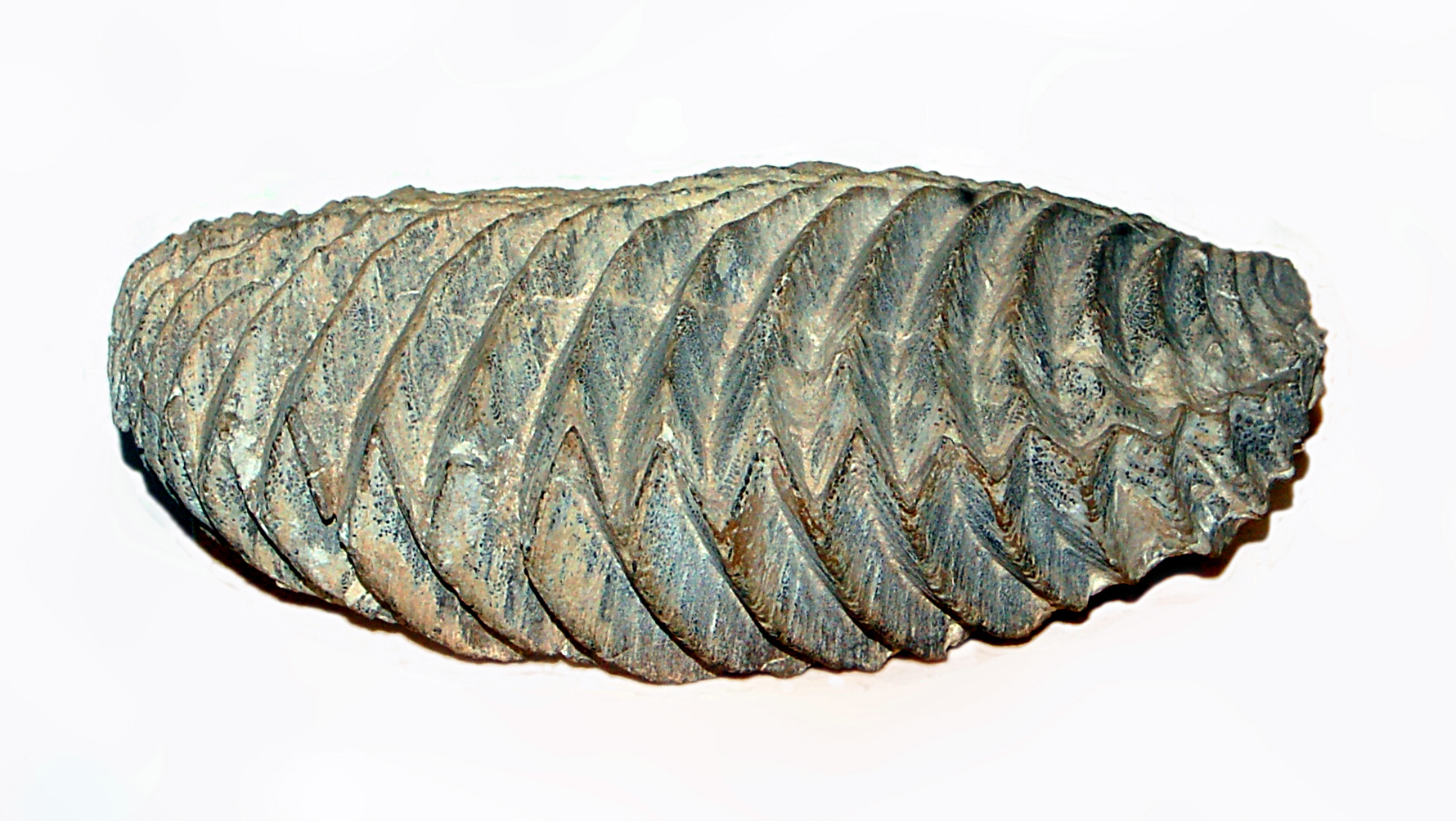
- Fossilized shell of the Triassic-modern marine bivalve Lopha
  Lopha
- †Lucina
- Lunatia
  - †Lunatia dakotensis – or unidentified comparable form
- †Lygobius – type locality for genus
  - †Lygobius knowltoni – type locality for species

== M ==
- †Magadiceramus
  - †Magadiceramus soukupi
- †Magnuviator – type locality for genus
  - †Magnuviator ovimonsensis – type locality for species
- †Maiasaura – type locality for genus
  - †Maiasaura peeblesorum – type locality for species
- †Marchantiolites
  - †Marchantiolites blairmorensis
- †Marmarthia
  - †Marmarthia trivialis
- †Medusaceratops – type locality for genus
  - †Medusaceratops lokii – type locality for species
- †Meleagrinella
  - †Meleagrinella curta
- †Melvius – type locality for genus
  - †Melvius thomasi – type locality for species
- †Meniscoessus
  - †Meniscoessus major
  - †Meniscoessus robustus – type locality for species
- †Meniscognathus
  - †Meniscognathus altmani
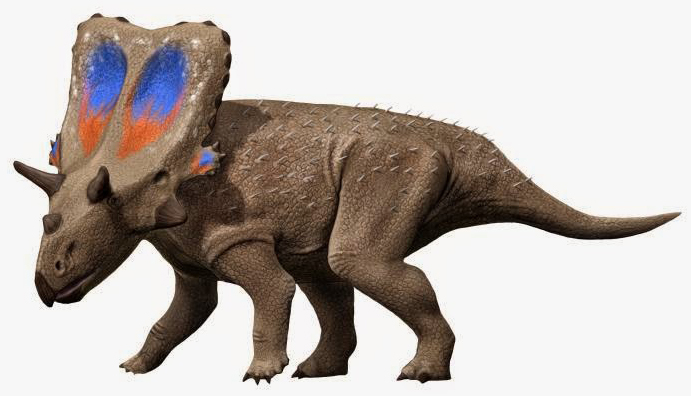
- Life restoration of the Late Cretaceous horned dinosaur Mercuriceratops
  †Mercuriceratops – type locality for genus
  - †Mercuriceratops gemini – type locality for species
- †Mesodma
  - †Mesodma formosa
  - †Mesodma hensleighi
  - †Mesodma primaeva
  - †Mesodma thompsoni
- †Metoicoceras
  - †Metoicoceras geslinianum
  - †Metoicoceras mosbyense – type locality for species
  - †Metoicoceras muelleri
- †Metzgeriites
  - †Metzgeriites montanensis – type locality for species
- †Micrabacia
  - †Micrabacia radiata
- †Microsulcatoceras – type locality for genus
  - †Microsulcatoceras puzosiiforme – type locality for species
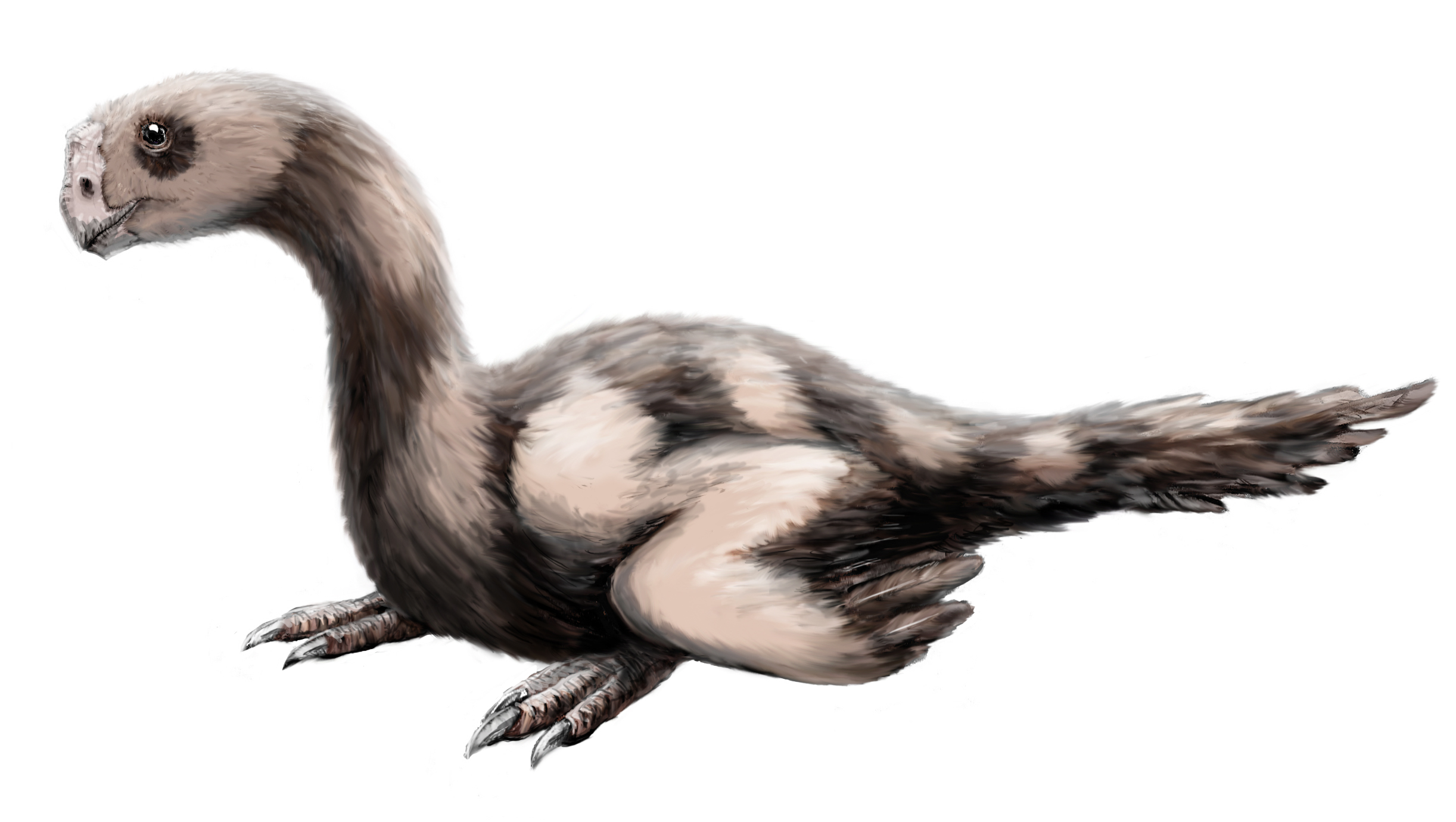
- Life restoration of the Early Cretaceous oviraptorosaur Microvenator
  †Microvenator – type locality for genus
  - †Microvenator celer – type locality for species
- †Minerisporites
  - †Minerisporites pseudorichardsonii
- †Miocidaris
- †Modiolus
  - †Modiolus rosii
- †Monoclonius – type locality for genus
  - †Monoclonius crassus – type locality for species
  - †Monoclonius recurvicornis – type locality for species
  - †Monoclonius sphenocerus – type locality for species
- †Monosulcites
  - †Monosulcites riparius
- †Montanalestes
  - †Montanalestes keeblerorum
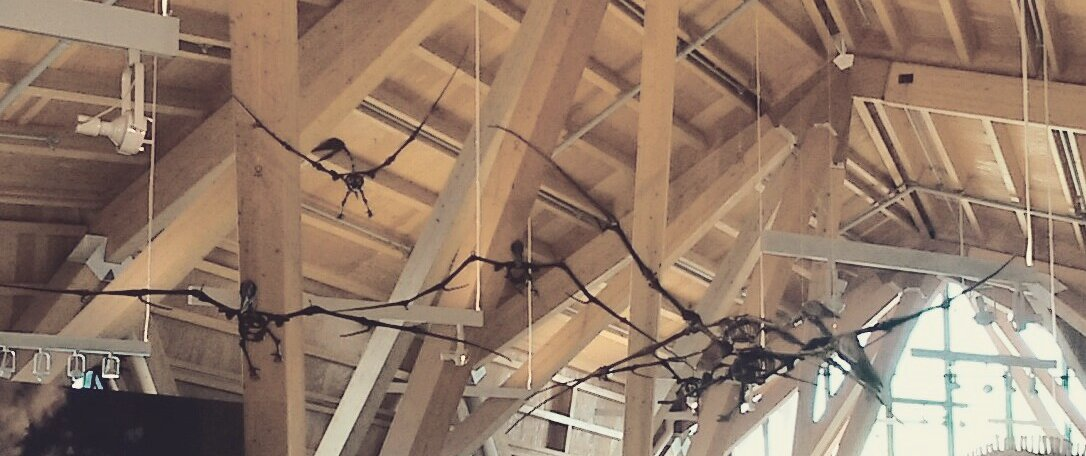
- Mounted fossilized skeletons of the Late Cretaceous pterosaur Montanazhdarcho
  †Montanazhdarcho – type locality for genus
  - †Montanazhdarcho minor – type locality for species
- †Montania – type locality for genus
  - †Montania glandulosa – type locality for species
- †Montanoceratops
  - †Montanoceratops cerorhynchus – type locality for species
- †Montanoolithus – type locality for genus
  - †Montanoolithus strongorum – type locality for species
- †Moremanoceras
  - †Moremanoceras costatum
  - †Moremanoceras montanaense – type locality for species
  - †Moremanoceras straini
- †Mosasaurus
  - †Mosasaurus missouriensis
- †Myalina
  - †Myalina postcarbonica
- †Myledaphus
  - †Myledaphus bipartitus
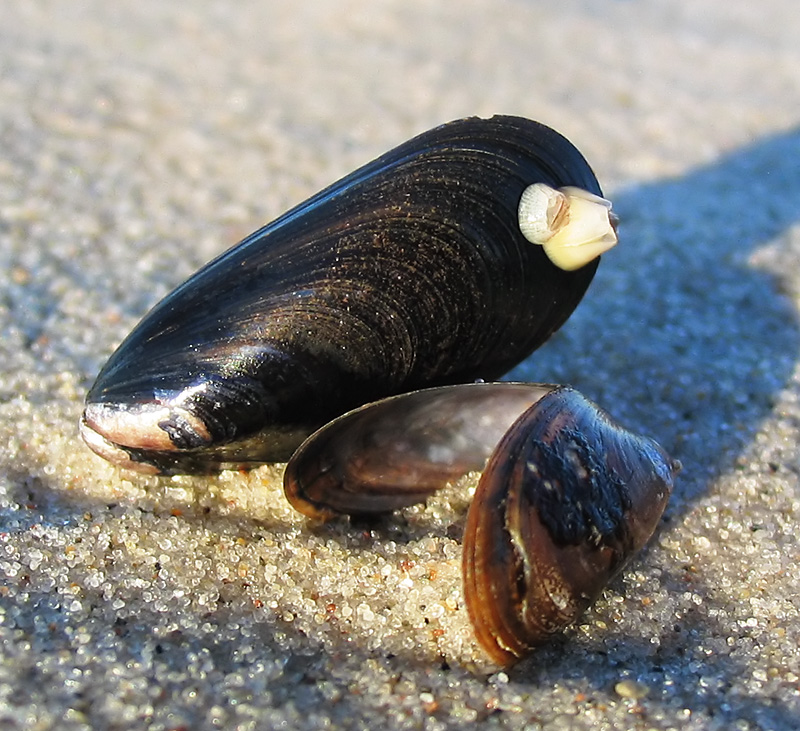
- Shells washed ashore of Mytilus mussels
  †Mytilus

== N ==
- †Nannometoicoceras
  - †Nannometoicoceras nanos – type locality for species
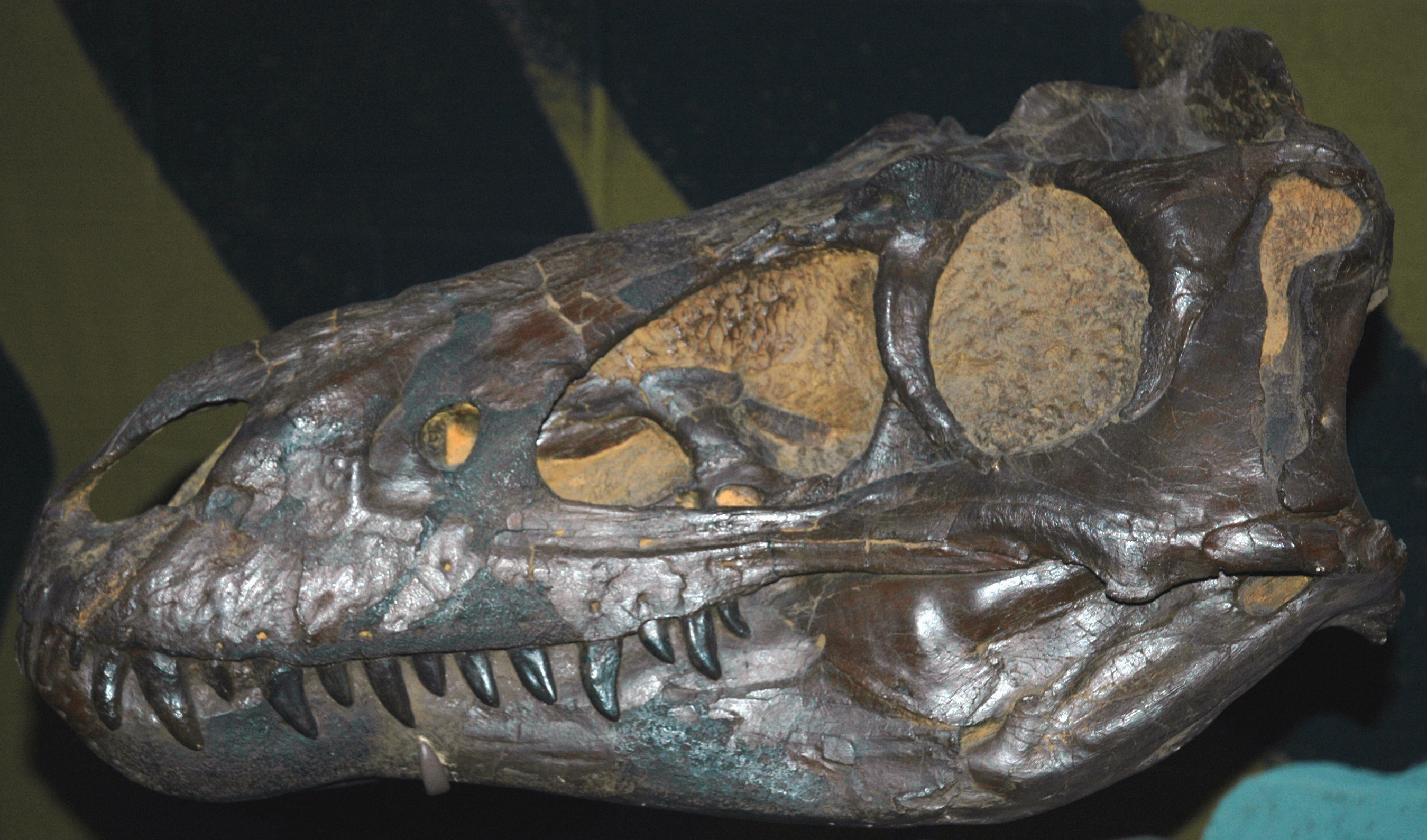
- Fossilized skull of the Late Cretaceous tyrannosaur Nanotyrannus, possibly a juvenile Tyrannosaurus rather than a distinct genus
  †Nanotyrannus
  - †Nanotyrannus lancensis – type locality for species
- †Naomichelys – type locality for genus
  - †Naomichelys speciosa – type locality for species
- †Necrocarcinus
- †Nelumbo
  - †Nelumbo peltata – type locality for species
- †Neocardioceras
  - †Neocardioceras juddii
  - †Neocardioceras minutum
- †Neogastroplites
  - †Neogastroplites haasi
- †Neoplagiaulax
  - †Neoplagiaulax burgessi – type locality for species
- †Neoschizodus
- †Neurankylus – type locality for genus
  - †Neurankylus eximius – type locality for species
- †Nezpercius – type locality for genus
  - †Nezpercius dodsoni – type locality for species
- †Nidimys – type locality for genus
  - †Nidimys occultus – type locality for species
- †Nilsonia
  - †Nilsonia compta – or unidentified comparable form
- †Normannites – tentative report
  - †Normannites crickmayi – or unidentified comparable form
- †Nortedelphys – type locality for genus
  - †Nortedelphys jasoni – type locality for species
  - †Nortedelphys minimus – type locality for species
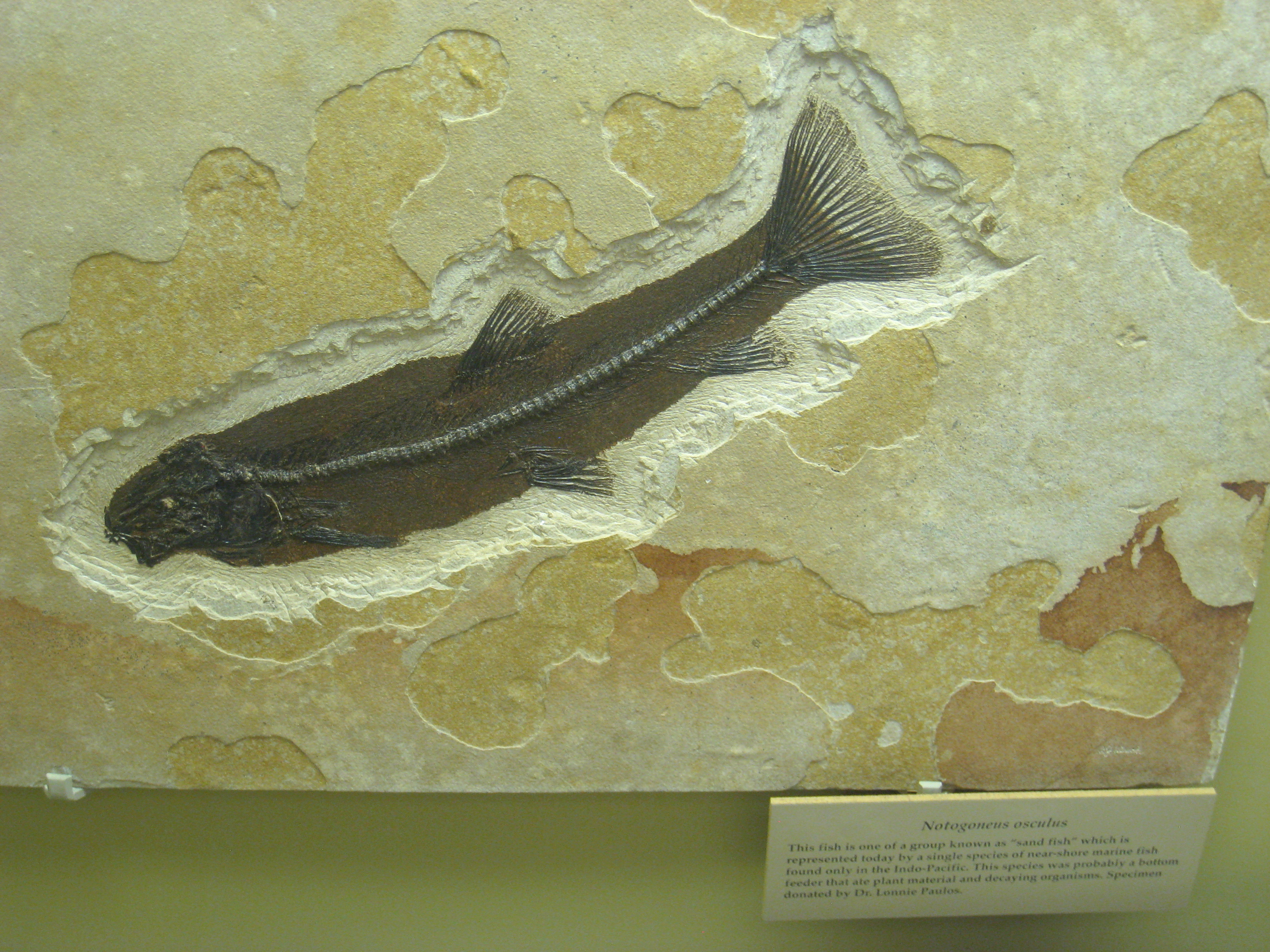
- Fossilized skeleton of the Late Cretaceous-Eocene bony fish Notogoneus
  †Notogoneus
  - †Notogoneus montananesis – type locality for species
  - †Notogoneus montenensis – type locality for species
- Nucula
- †Nymphaeites

== O ==
- †Obamadon – type locality for genus
  - †Obamadon gracilis – type locality for species
- †Odaxosaurus
  - †Odaxosaurus piger
- Odontaspis
  - †Odontaspis sanguinei – type locality for species
- †Oklatheridium
  - †Oklatheridium wiblei – type locality for species
- †Onchosaurus
  - †Onchosaurus avonicolus
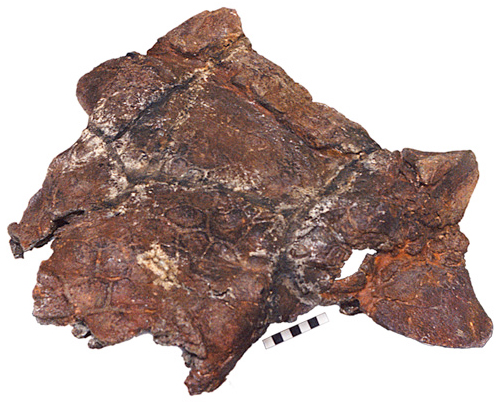
- Fossilized partial cranium of the Late Cretaceous armored dinosaur Oohkotokia
  †Oohkotokia – type locality for genus
  - †Oohkotokia horneri – type locality for species
- †Ophioglypha
  - †Ophioglypha bridgerensis
- †Ophiomorpha
- †Opisthotriton
  - †Opisthotriton kayi
- †Orbicoelia
- †Ornithomimus
  - †Ornithomimus grandis – type locality for species
  - †Ornithomimus tenuis – type locality for species
- †Orodromeus – type locality for genus
  - †Orodromeus makelai – type locality for species
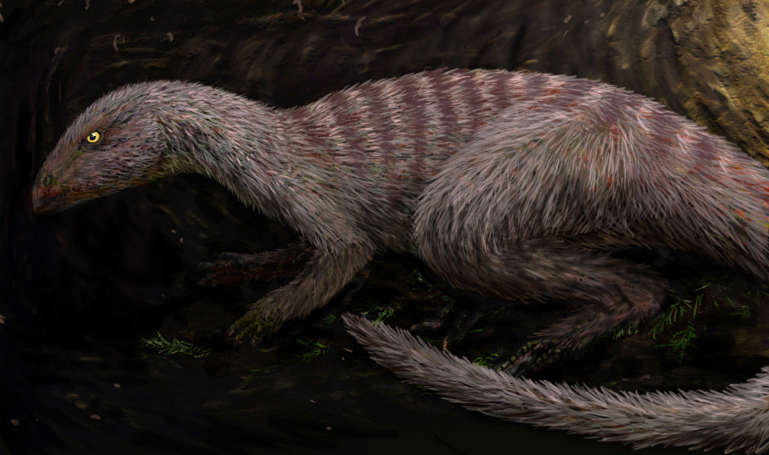
- Life restoration of the Late Cretaceous herbivorous dinosaur Oryctodromeus in a burrow
  †Oryctodromeus – type locality for genus
  - †Oryctodromeus cubicularis – type locality for species
- Ostrea
- †Oxybeloceras
  - †Oxybeloceras crassum
- †Oxytoma
  - †Oxytoma mclearni

== P ==
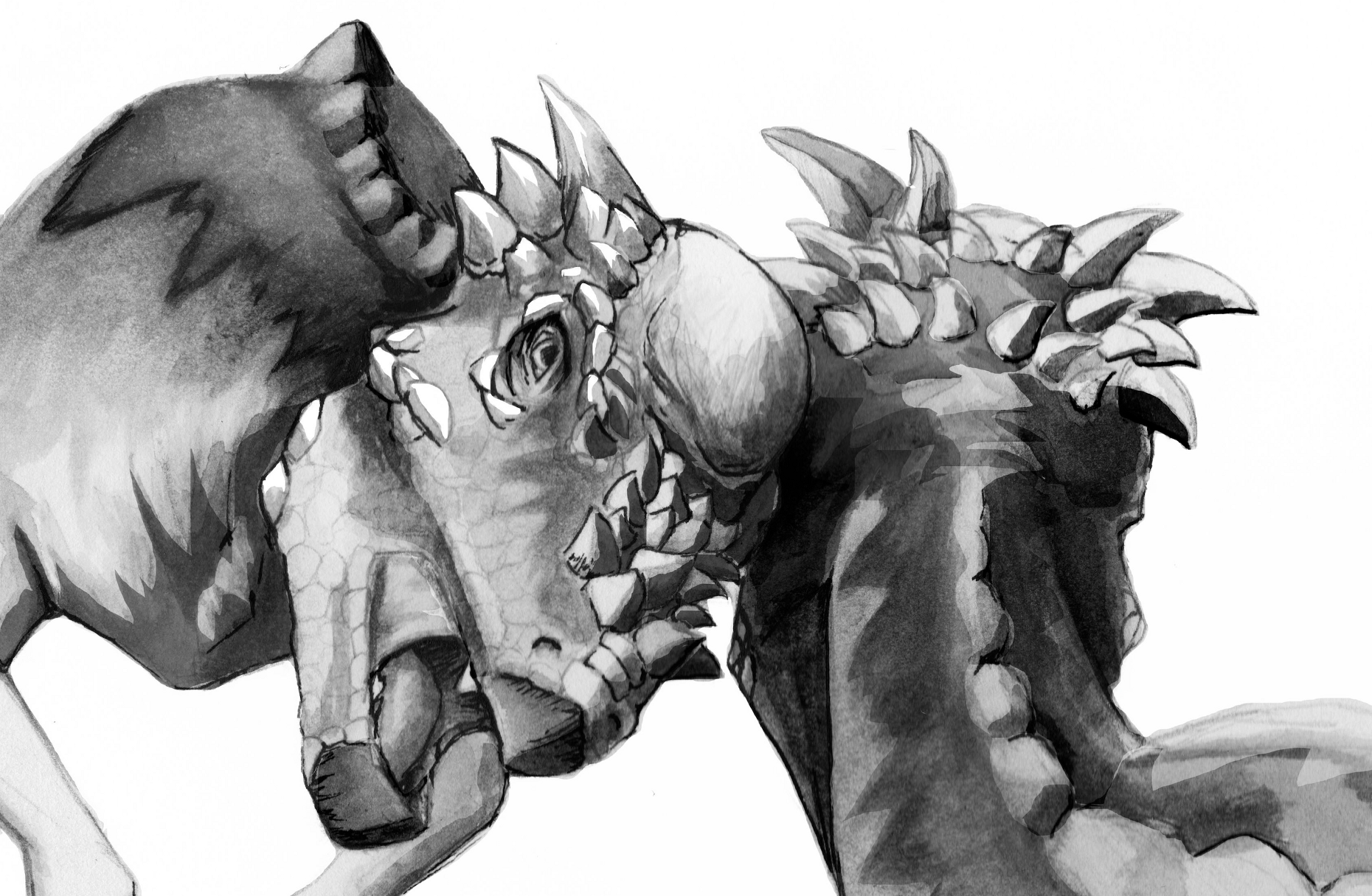
- Life restoration of subadults of the Late Cretaceous dome-headed dinosaur Pachycephalosaurus butting heads
  †Pachycephalosaurus – type locality for genus
  - †Pachycephalosaurus wyomingensis – type locality for species
- †Pagiophyllum
- †Palaeobatrachus
  - †Palaeobatrachus occidentalis
- †Palaeolabrus
  - †Palaeolabrus montanensis
- †Palaeosaniwa
  - †Palaeosaniwa canadensis
- †Palaeoscincus – type locality for genus
  - †Palaeoscincus costatus – type locality for species
- †Palatobaena
  - †Palatobaena bairdi
- †Paleopsephurus – type locality for genus
  - †Paleopsephurus wilsoni – type locality for species
- †Paleoungulatum – type locality for genus
  - †Paleoungulatum hooleyi – type locality for species
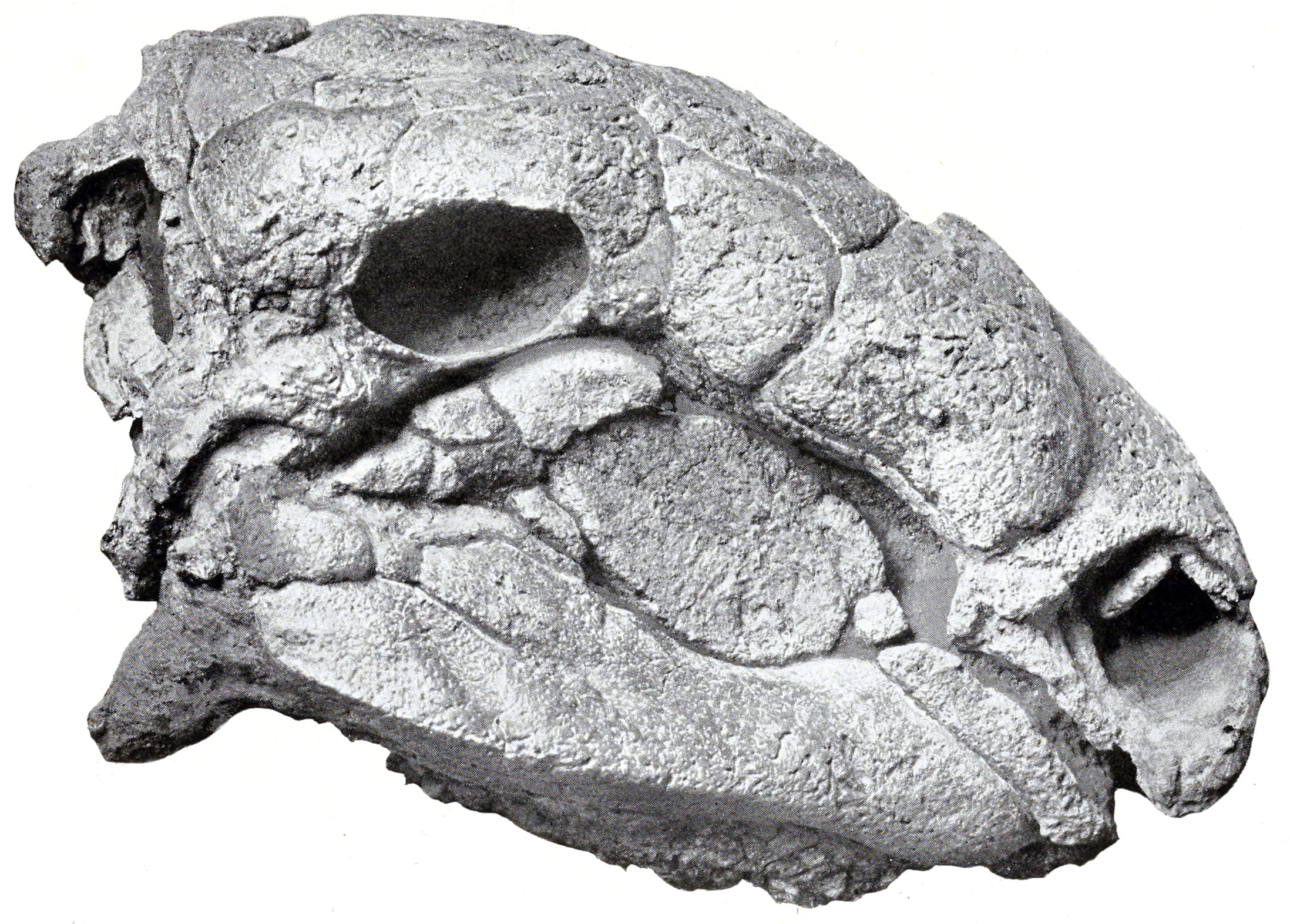
- Illustration of a fossilized skull of the Late Cretaceous armored dinosaur Panoplosaurus
  †Panoplosaurus
- †Pappotherium
  - †Pappotherium pattersoni
- †Parachondroceras
  - †Parachondroceras andrewsi
  - †Parachondroceras filicostatum
- †Paracimexomys
  - †Paracimexomys judithae – type locality for species
  - †Paracimexomys magnus – type locality for species
  - †Paracimexomys priscus
  - †Paracimexomys propriscus – type locality for species
  - †Paracimexomys robisoni – or unidentified comparable form
- †Paraderma
  - †Paraderma bogerti
- †Paralbula
  - †Paralbula casei
- †Paramacellodus – or unidentified comparable form
  - †Paramacellodus keebleri – type locality for species
- †Paranecturus – type locality for genus
  - †Paranecturus garbanii – type locality for species
- †Paranyctoides
  - †Paranyctoides maleficus
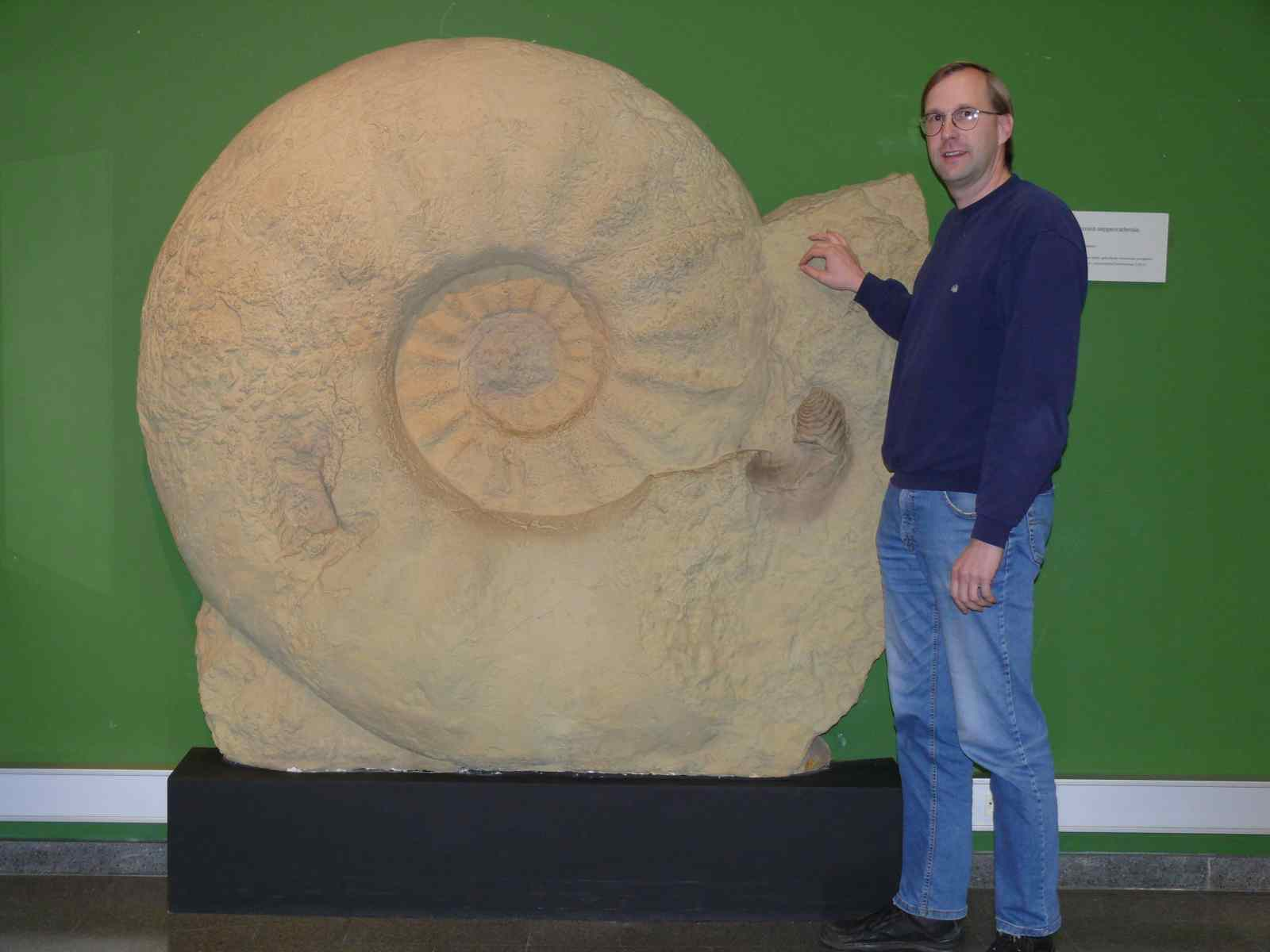
- Fossilized shell of the Late Cretaceous ammonoid cephalopod Parapuzosia with a human indicating its size
  †Parapuzosia
  - †Parapuzosia bradyi – type locality for species
- †Parasaniwa
  - †Parasaniwa wyomingensis
- †Parataxodium
- †Parazolla – type locality for genus
  - †Parazolla heterotricha – type locality for species
- †Parazollopsis – type locality for genus
  - †Parazollopsis cascadensis – type locality for species
- †Paronychodon
  - †Paronychodon lacustris
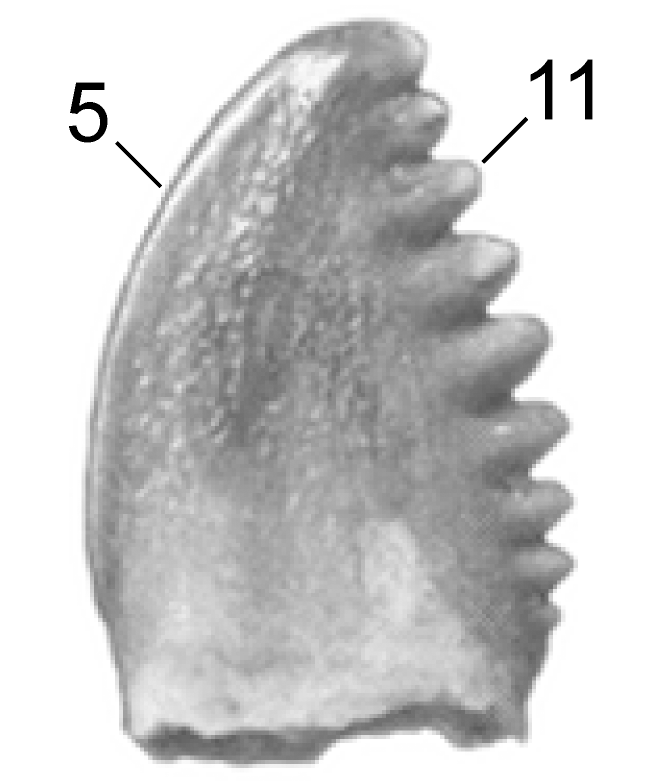
- Micrograph of a fossilized tooth of the Late Cretaceous troodontid Pectinodon
  †Pectinodon – or unidentified comparable form
- †Pediomys
  - †Pediomys elegans
- †Peneteius – type locality for genus
  - †Peneteius aquilonius – type locality for species
- †Penetetrapites
  - †Penetetrapites inconspicuous
- †Pentacrinus
  - †Pentacrinus asteriscus
- †Permophorus
  - †Permophorus triassicus
- †Phelopteria
- Pholadomya
  - †Pholadomya inaequiplicatus
  - †Pholadomya kingi
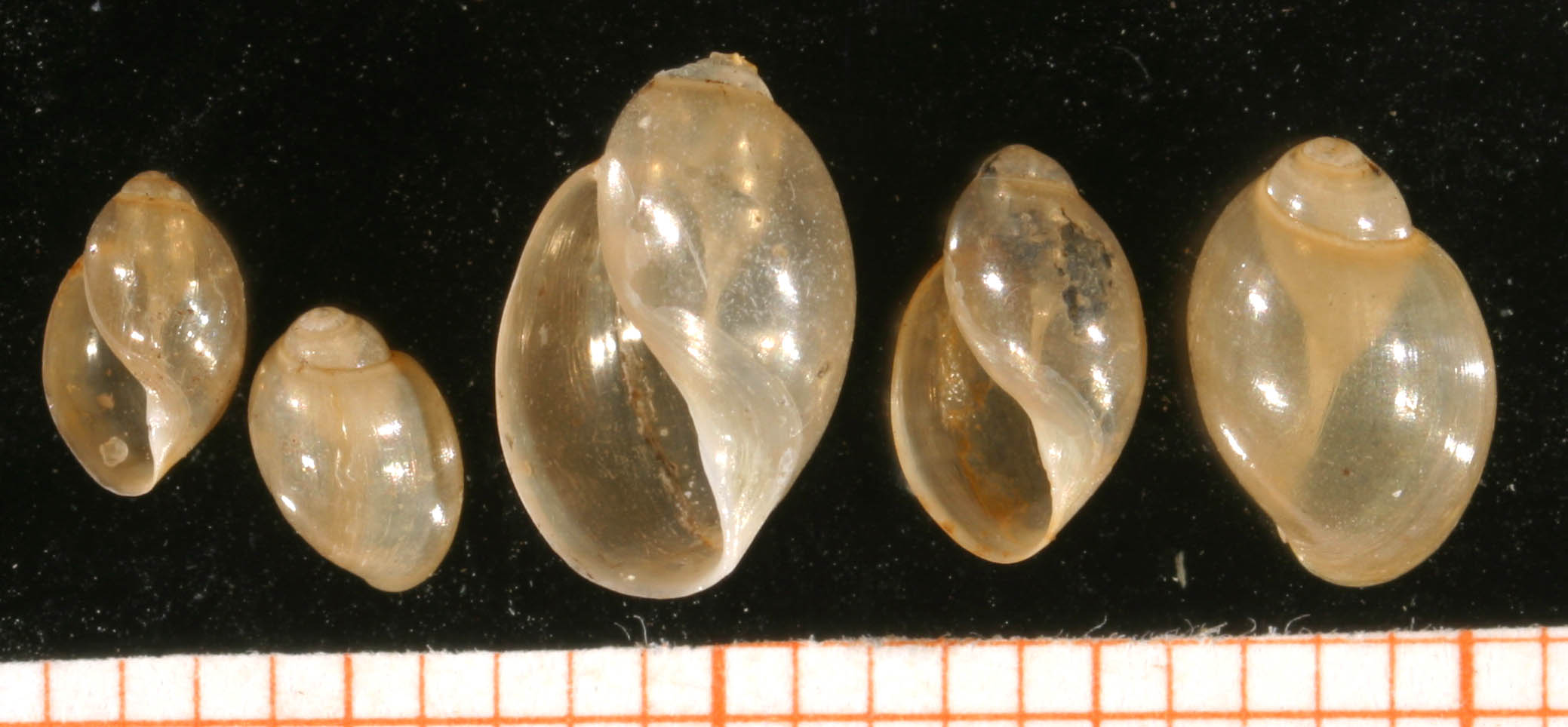
- Shells in differing orientations of Physa freshwater bladder snails
  Physa
  - †Physa copei – or unidentified comparable form
- †Piceoerpeton
  - †Piceoerpeton naylori – type locality for species
- †Piksi – type locality for genus
  - †Piksi barbarulna – type locality for species
- †Pinna
  - †Pinna kingi
- †Pistia
  - †Pistia corrugata
- †Pityocladus
- †Pityophyllum
  - †Pityophyllum lindstromi
- †Pityosporites
  - †Pityosporites constrictus
- †Placunopsis
- †Plastomenus
  - †Plastomenus costatus
- †Platacodon
  - †Platacodon nanus
- †Platanophyllum
- †Plesiacanthoceras
  - †Plesiacanthoceras wyomingense
- †Plesiacanthoceratoides
  - †Plesiacanthoceratoides alzadense
- †Plesiobaena
  - †Plesiobaena antiqua
- †Pleuromya
  - †Pleuromya oblongata – or unidentified comparable form
  - †Pleuromya subcompressa
- †Pleuronautilus
- †Pleuronectites – tentative report
- †Plicatolamna
  - †Plicatolamna arcuata
- †Podozamites
  - †Podozamites lanceolatus
- †Polycingulatisporites
  - †Polycingulatisporites reduncus
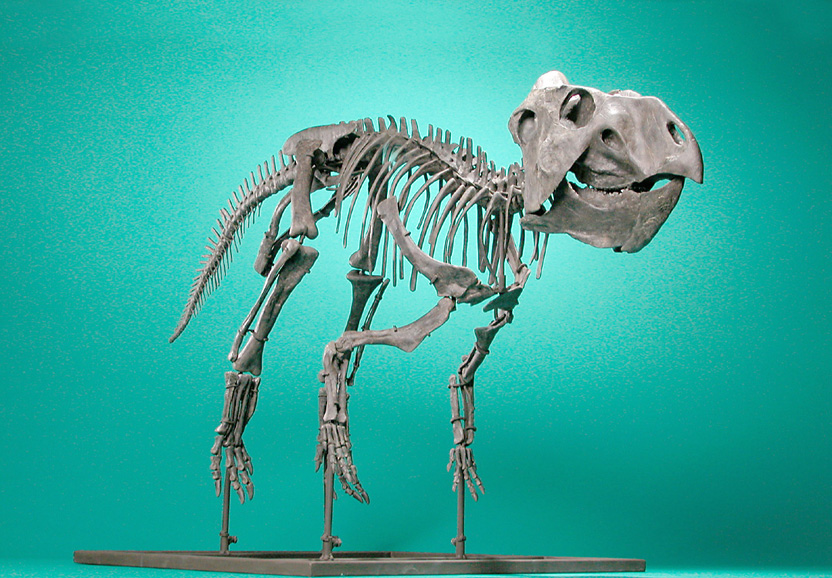
- Mounted fossilized skeleton of the Late Cretaceous primitive horned dinosaur Prenoceratops
  †Prenoceratops – type locality for genus
  - †Prenoceratops pieganensis – type locality for species
- †Prismatoolithus
  - †Prismatoolithus hirschi – type locality for species
  - †Prismatoolithus levis
- †Pristinuspollenites
  - †Pristinuspollenites microsaccus
- †Proamphiuma
  - †Proamphiuma cretacea
- †Procerberus
- †Prodesmodon
  - †Prodesmodon copei
- †Promyalina
  - †Promyalina spathi – type locality for species
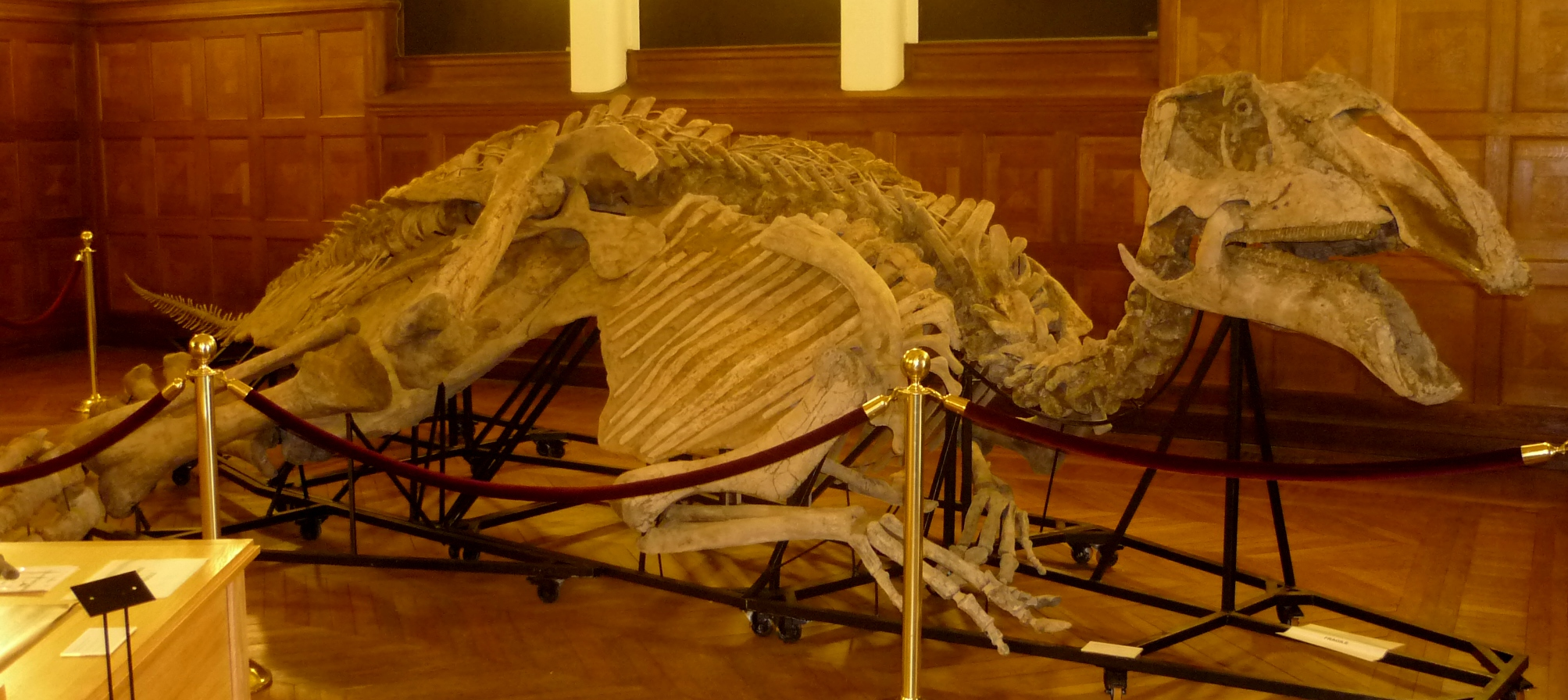
- Mounted fossilized skeleton of the Late Cretaceous duck-billed dinosaur Prosaurolophus
  †Prosaurolophus
  - †Prosaurolophus blackfeetensis – type locality for species
- †Protalphadon
  - †Protalphadon foxi – type locality for species
  - †Protalphadon lulli
- †Protexanites
- †Protocaiman
- †Protocardia
  - †Protocardia schucherti
- †Protolambda
  - †Protolambda mcgilli – type locality for species
  - †?Protolambda clemensi – type locality for species
  - †Protolambda florencae
  - †Protolambda hatcheri
- †Protolamna
  - †Protolamna sokolovi
- †Protophyllocladus
  - †Protophyllocladus subintegrifolius
- †Protophyllum – or unidentified comparable form
- †Protoplatyrhina – type locality for genus
  - †Protoplatyrhina renae – type locality for species
- †Protoscaphirhynchus – type locality for genus
  - †Protoscaphirhynchus squamosus – type locality for species
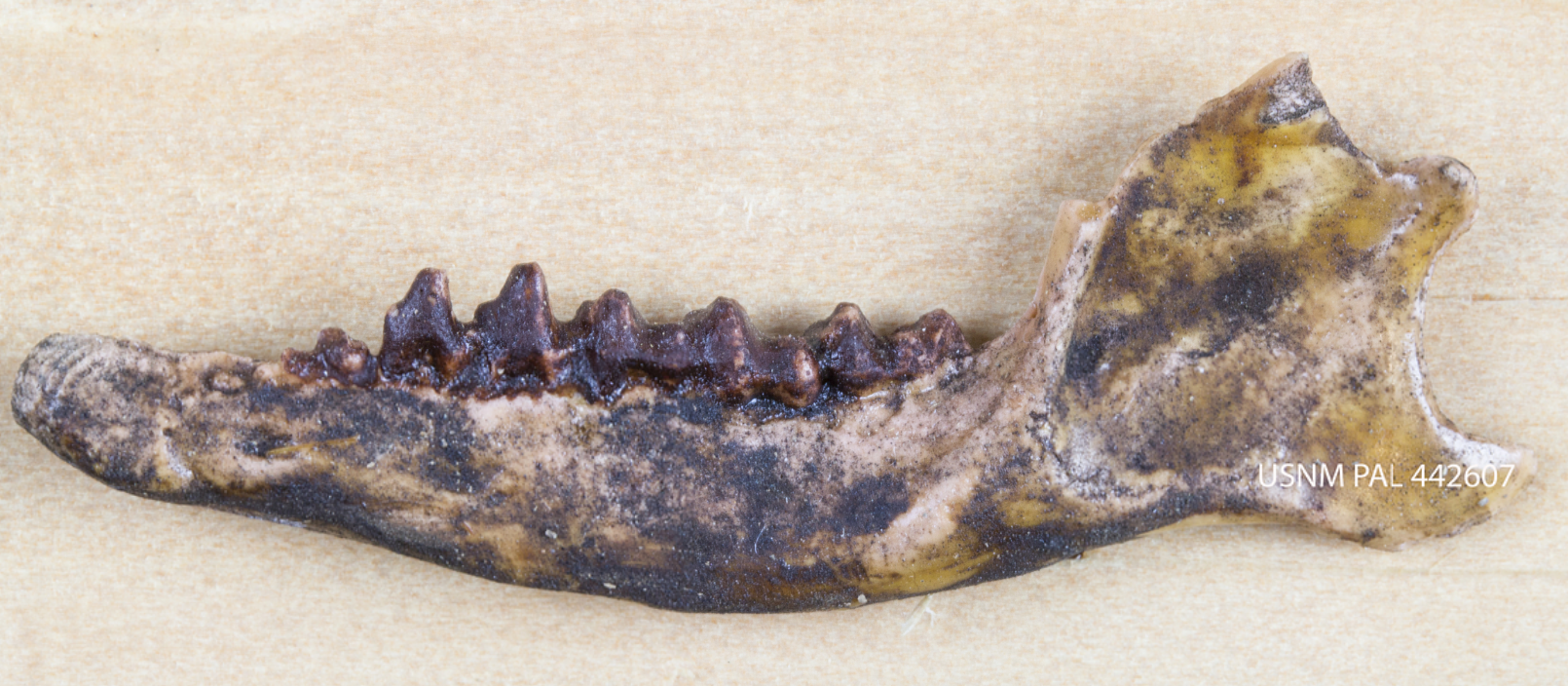
- Fossilized mandible of the Late Cretaceous-Paleocene mammal Protungulatum
  †Protungulatum
  - †Protungulatum coombsi – type locality for species
  - †Protungulatum gorgun
- †Psammorhynchus
  - †Psammorhynchus longipinnis – type locality for species
- †Pseudocycas
  - †Pseudocycas douglasii – type locality for species
- †Pseudohypolophus
- †Pseudomelania
  - †Pseudomelania hendricksoni
- †Pteria – tentative report
  - †Pteria ussurica – or unidentified comparable form
- †Pteropelyx – type locality for genus
  - †Pteropelyx grallipes – type locality for species
- †Ptychotrygon
  - †Ptychotrygon blainensis – type locality for species
  - †Ptychotrygon hooveri
  - †Ptychotrygon triangularis
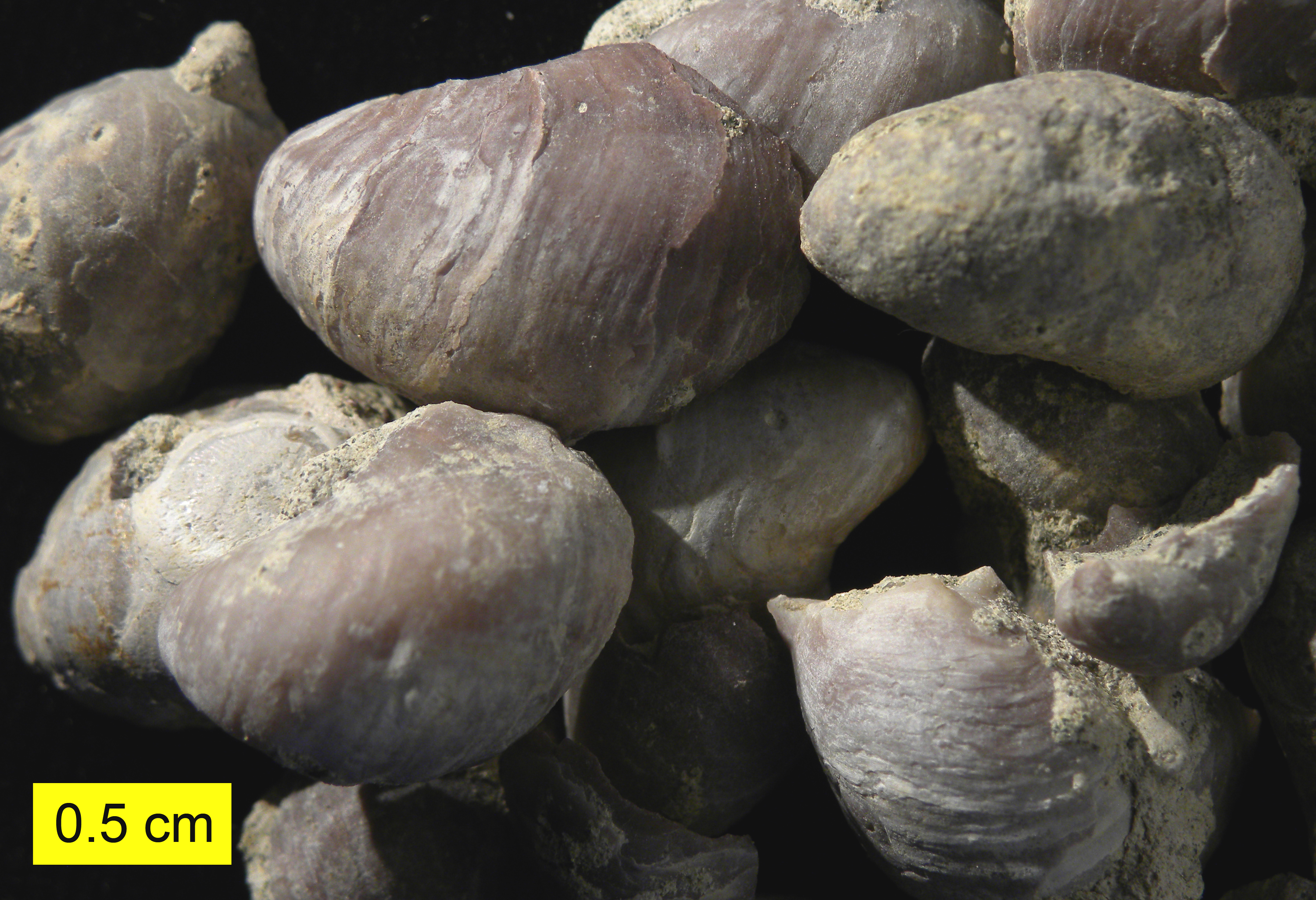
- Assemblage of fossilized shells of the Cretaceous-Pleistocene oyster Pycnodonte
  Pycnodonte

== Q ==
- †Quenstedtia – tentative report
- Quercus – report made of unidentified related form or using admittedly obsolete nomenclature
  - †Quercus stantoni
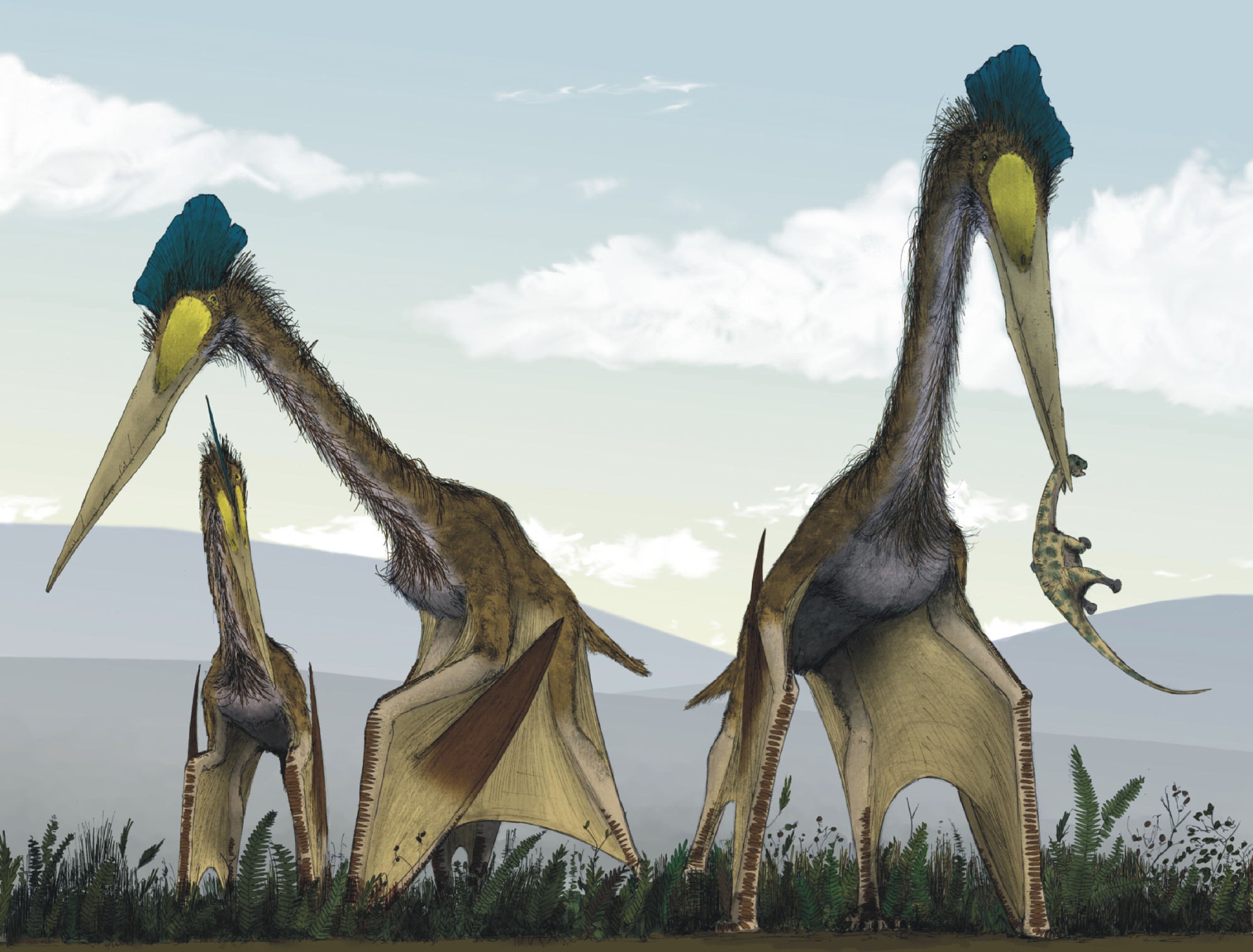
- Life restoration of a flock of the Late Cretaceous pterosaur Quetzalcoatlus feeding on the ground
  †Quetzalcoatlus – or unidentified comparable form

== R ==
- †Retinovena – type locality for genus
  - †Retinovena fluvialis – type locality for species
- †Retitricolpites
  - †Retitricolpites microreticulatus
- Rhabdocolpus
- †Rhaeboceras
  - †Rhaeboceras burkholderi – type locality for species
  - †Rhaeboceras cedarense – type locality for species
  - †Rhaeboceras coloradoense
  - †Rhaeboceras halli
  - †Rhaeboceras subglobosum
- †Rhamnus – report made of unidentified related form or using admittedly obsolete nomenclature
  - †Rhamnus cleburni
- †Richardoestesia
  - †Richardoestesia gilmorei
  - †Richardoestesia isosceles
- †Rostellites – tentative report
- †Rugocaudia – type locality for genus
  - †Rugocaudia cooneyi – type locality for species

== S ==
- †Sagenopteris
  - †Sagenopteris elliptica
  - †Sagenopteris mclearni
  - †Sagenopteris williamsii
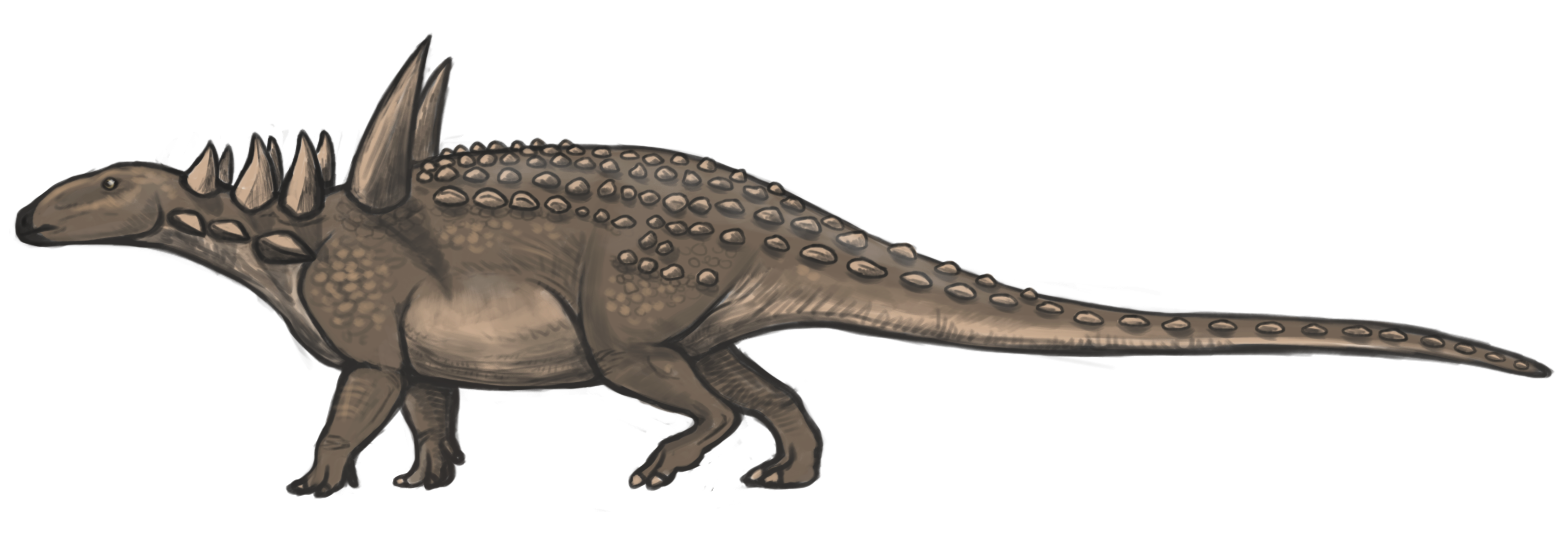
- Life restoration of the Early Cretaceous armored dinosaurs Sauropelta
  †Sauropelta – type locality for genus
  - †Sauropelta edwardsorum – type locality for species
- †Saurornitholestes
  - †Saurornitholestes langstoni
- †Scabrastephanocolpites
  - †Scabrastephanocolpites lepidus
- †Scapherpeton
  - †Scapherpeton tectum
- †Scaphites
  - †Scaphites impendicostatus
  - †Scaphites mariasensis
  - †Scaphites preventricosus
  - †Scaphites ventricosus
- †Scaphotrigonia
  - †Scaphotrigonia naviformis
- †Schizolepis
- †Schizosporis
  - †Schizosporis laevigatus
- †Sciponoceras
  - †Sciponoceras gracile
- †Scollardius
  - †Scollardius propalaeoryctes
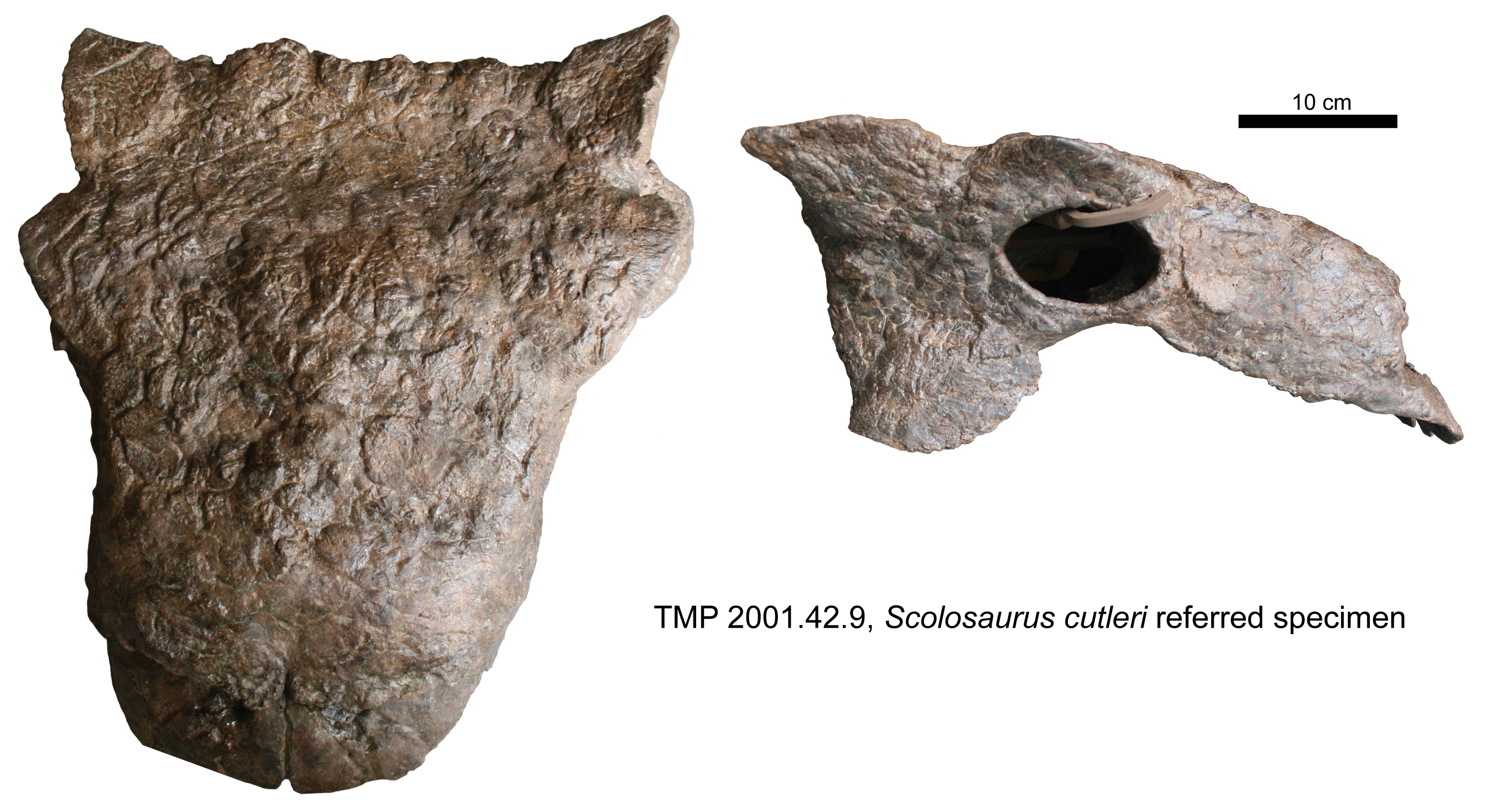
- Fossilized cranium in multiple views of the Late Cretaceous armored dinosaur Scolosaurus
  †Scolosaurus
  - †Scolosaurus cutleri
- †Scotiophryne – type locality for genus
  - †Scotiophryne pustulosa – type locality for species
- †Sequoia
- †Siberiapollis
  - †Siberiapollis montanensis
- †Sohlites
  - †Sohlites spinosus
- †Solenoceras
  - †Solenoceras bearpawense
- †Spalacotheridium
  - †Spalacotheridium mckennai
- Sphaerium
  - †Sphaerium planum
- †Sphaerotholus
  - †Sphaerotholus buchholtzae – type locality for species
- †Sphenopteris
  - †Sphenopteris brulensis
  - †Sphenopteris geopperti
  - †Sphenopteris goepperti
  - †Sphenopteris latiloba
  - †Sphenopteris mclearni
- †Spheroolithus
  - †Spheroolithus albertensis
  - †Spheroolithus choteauensis – type locality for species
  - †Spheroolithus maiasauroides
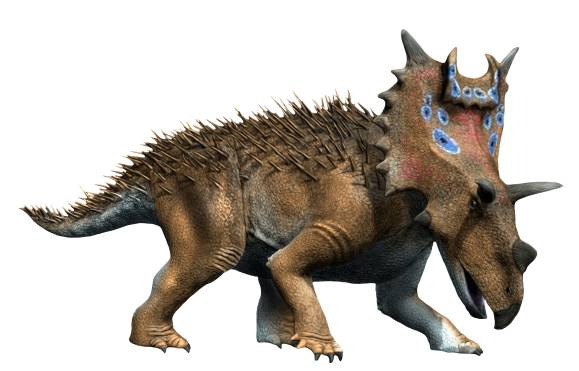
- Life restoration of the Late Cretaceous horned dinosaur Spiclypeus
  †Spiclypeus – type locality for genus
  - †Spiclypeus shipporum – type locality for species
- †Spiriferina – report made of unidentified related form or using admittedly obsolete nomenclature
- †Sporonites
  - †Sporonites montanensis – type locality for species
- Squalicorax
  - †Squalicorax kaupi
  - †Squalicorax pristodontus
- †Squatirhina
  - †Squatirhina americana
- †Stantoniella – type locality for genus
  - †Stantoniella cretacea – type locality for species
- †Stegoceras
  - †Stegoceras validum
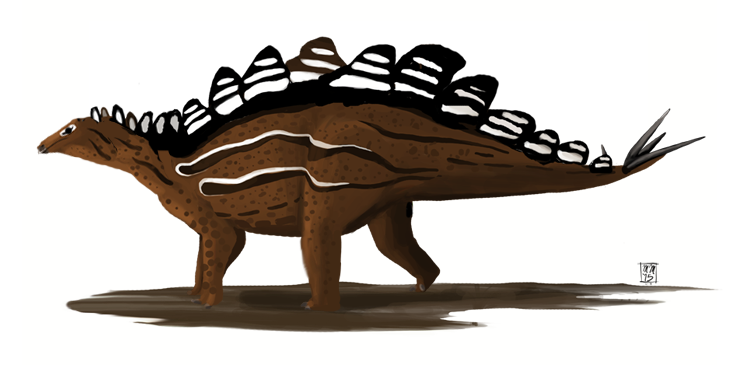
- Restoration of the Late Jurassic stegosaur Stegosaurus
  †Stegosaurus
- †Stemmatoceras
  - †Stemmatoceras albertense – or unidentified related form
  - †Stemmatoceras arcicostum
  - †Stemmatoceras palliseri – or unidentified related form
- †Stygiochelys – type locality for genus
  - †Stygiochelys estesi – type locality for species
- †Styracosaurus
  - †Styracosaurus ovatus – type locality for species
- †Sumitomoceras
- †Suuwassea – type locality for genus
  - †Suuwassea emilieae – type locality for species
- †Symmetrodontoides
  - †Symmetrodontoides canadensis
- †Synechodus
  - †Synechodus andersoni – type locality for species
  - †Synechodus striatus – type locality for species

== T ==
- †Tancredia
  - †Tancredia inornata – or unidentified comparable form
- †Tarrantoceras
  - †Tarrantoceras cuspidum
- †Tatankacephalus – type locality for genus
  - †Tatankacephalus cooneyorum – type locality for species
- †Taxodiaceaepollenites
  - †Taxodiaceaepollenites hiatus
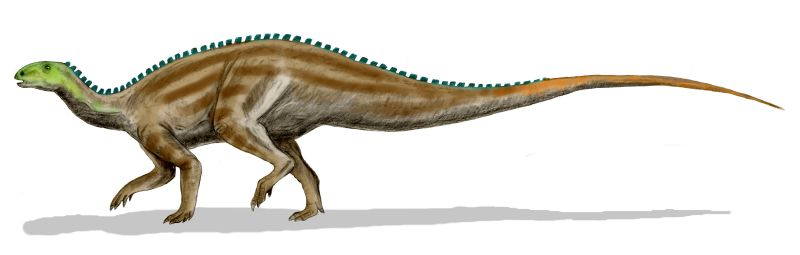
- Life restoration of the Early Cretaceous Iguanodon relative Tenontosaurus
  †Tenontosaurus – type locality for genus
  - †Tenontosaurus tilletti – type locality for species
- †Terminonaris – type locality for genus
  - †Terminonaris browni – type locality for species
  - †Terminonaris robusta – type locality for species
- †Thalassomedon – type locality for genus
  - †Thalassomedon hanningtoni – type locality for species
- †Thescelosaurus
  - †Thescelosaurus garbanii – type locality for species
  - †Thescelosaurus neglectus
- †Thescelus
  - †Thescelus insiliens
- †Thlaeodon – tentative report
- †Todisporites
  - †Todisporites dubius – or unidentified comparable form
- †Toxolophosaurus – type locality for genus
  - †Toxolophosaurus cloudi – type locality for species
- †Trachodon – type locality for genus
  - †Trachodon altidens
  - †Trachodon marginatus
  - †Trachodon mirabilis – type locality for species
- †Trachytriton
  - †Trachytriton – type locality for species – informal
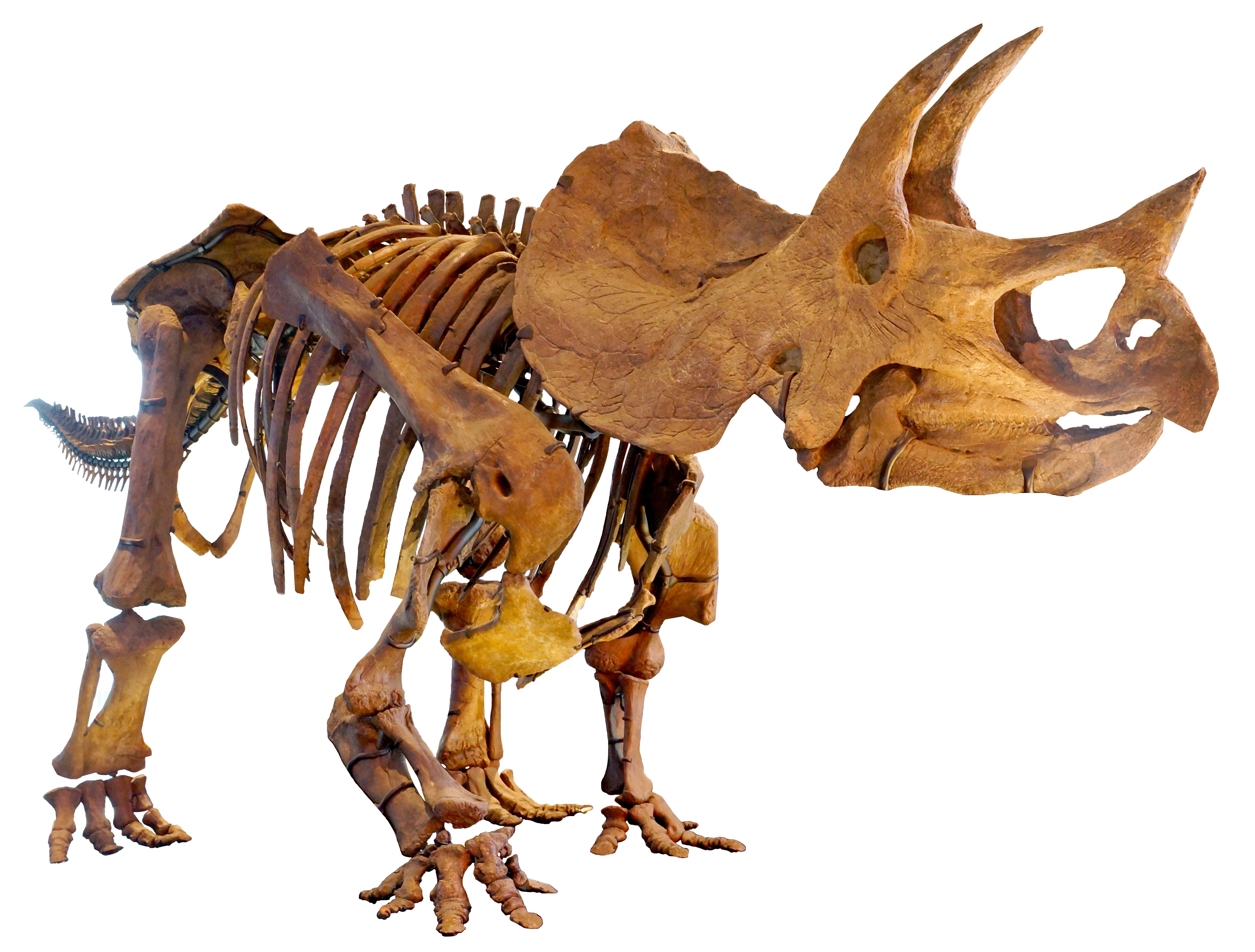
- Mounted fossilized skeleton of the Late Cretaceous horned dinosaur Triceratops
  †Triceratops
  - †Triceratops horridus
  - †Triceratops maximus – type locality for species
  - †Triceratops prorsus
- †Trigonia
  - †Trigonia conradi – or unidentified comparable form
  - †Trigonia montanaensis
  - †Trigonia trafalgarensis – or unidentified comparable form
- †Trigonocallista
  - †Trigonocallista orbiculata
- Trionyx
- †Triprismatoolithus – type locality for genus
  - †Triprismatoolithus stephensi – type locality for species
- †Trochicola
  - †Trochicola scollardiana
- †Trochodendroides
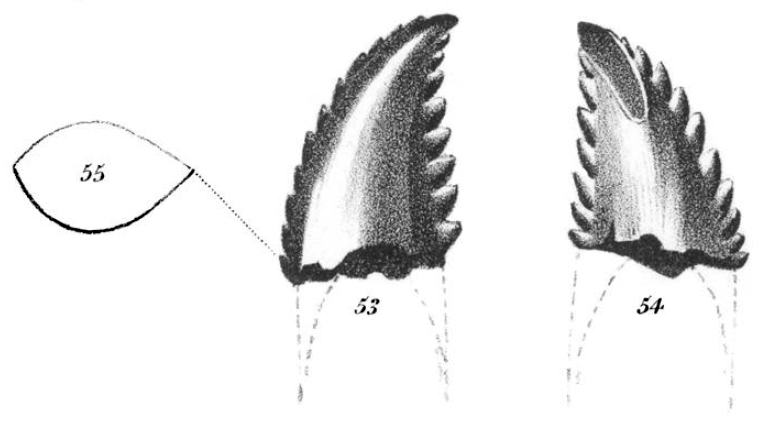
- Illustration of fossilized teeth of the Late Cretaceous Troodon
  †Troodon – type locality for genus
  - †Troodon formosus – type locality for species
- †Tubercuoolithus – type locality for genus
  - †Tubercuoolithus tetonensis – type locality for species
- †Tubulifloridites
  - †Tubulifloridites aedicula
- †Tullochelys
  - †Tullochelys montana
- †Turgidodon
  - †Turgidodon praesagus
  - †Turgidodon rhaister
  - †Turgidodon russelli
- Turritella
- †Tylosaurus
  - †Tylosaurus proriger
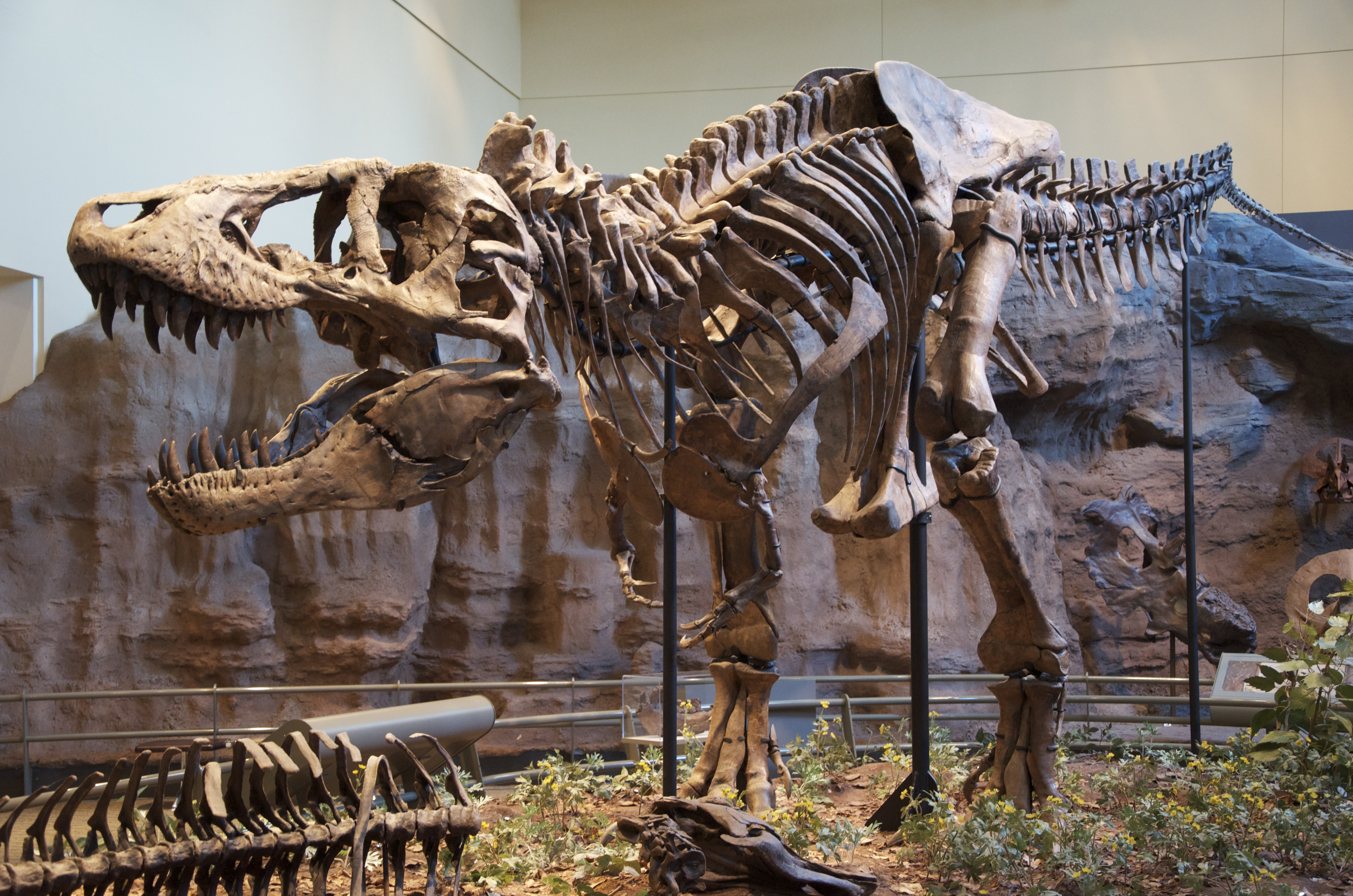
- Fossilized skeleton of the Late Cretaceous tyrannosaur Tyrannosaurus
  †Tyrannosaurus – type locality for genus
  - †Tyrannosaurus rex – type locality for species

== U ==
- †Ugrosaurus – type locality for genus
  - †Ugrosaurus olsoni – type locality for species
- Unio
- †Unionites
  - †Unionites fassaensis

== V ==
- †Valenopsalis
  - †Valenopsalis joyneri
- Valvata – tentative report
  - †Valvata montanensis
- †Varalphadon
  - †Varalphadon wahweapensis
- †Veniella
- Vitis – report made of unidentified related form or using admittedly obsolete nomenclature
  - †Vitis stantoni
- Viviparus
  - †Viviparus couesii
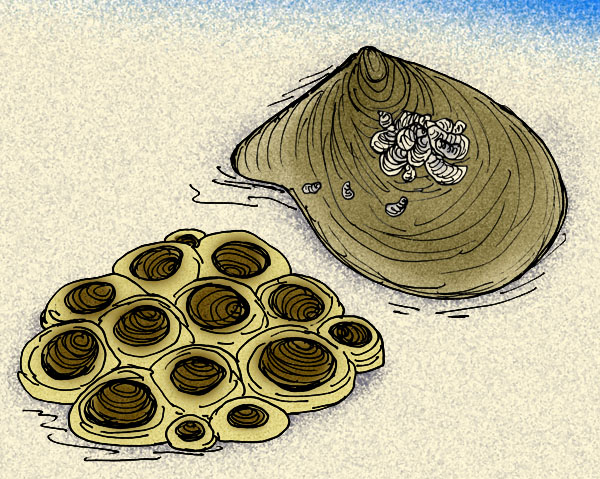
- Life restorations of the Late Cretaceous marine bivalve Volviceramus
  †Volviceramus
  - †Volviceramus exogyroides
  - †Volviceramus involutus

== W ==
- †Weediaphyllum – type locality for genus
  - †Weediaphyllum parkensis – type locality for species
- †Weltrichia
- †Wodehousia
  - †Wodehousia spinata
- †Woodwardia – report made of unidentified related form or using admittedly obsolete nomenclature
  - †Woodwardia crenata

== X ==
- †Xenocephalites – tentative report
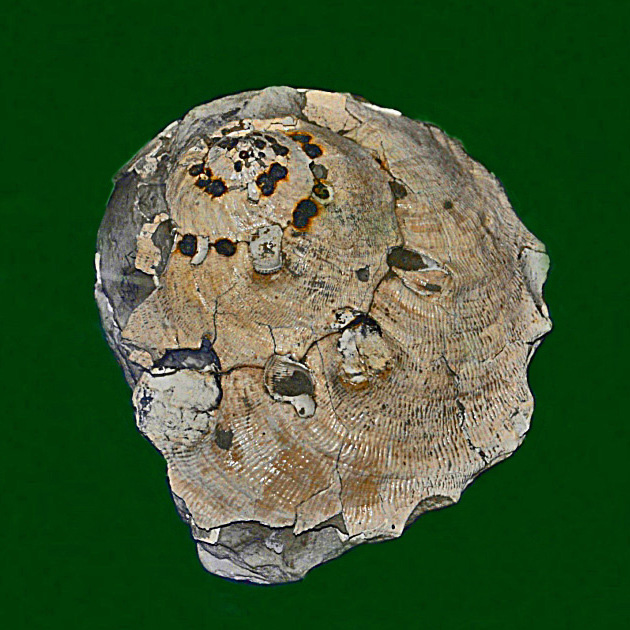
- A view of the fossil shell of Xenophora infundibulum
  Xenophora

== Y ==
- †Yezoites
  - †Yezoites delicatulus

== Z ==
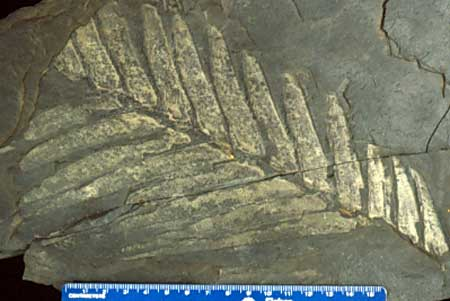
- Fossil of the Early Triassic-Eocene cycad-like frond Zamites
  †Zamites
  - †Zamites arcticus
- †Zapsalis – or unidentified comparable form
- †Zephyrosaurus – type locality for genus
  - †Zephyrosaurus schaffi – type locality for species
- †Zlivisporis
  - †Zlivisporis cenomanianus
- †Zygastrocarcinus
  - †Zygastrocarcinus waagei
