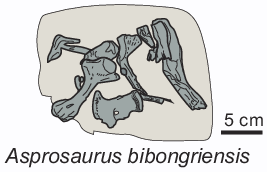
- Line drawing of holotype specimen of A. bibongriensis, associated skull, jaw, axial, and appendicular elements

Scientific classification
- Kingdom: Animalia
- Phylum: Chordata
- Class: Reptilia
- Order: Squamata
- Clade: †Mosasauria
- Superfamily: †Mosasauroidea (?)
- Genus: †Asprosaurus; Park, Evans & Huh, 2015
- Species: †A. bibongriensis

Binomial name
- †Asprosaurus bibongriensis Park, Evans & Huh, 2015

= Asprosaurus =

Asprosaurus Temporal range: Campanian 81 Ma

Extinct genus of lizards

Asprosaurus (lit. 'white lizard') is an extinct genus of anguimorph lizard from the Late Cretaceous (Campanian) of South Korea. The genus contains a single species, A. bibongriensis, which is the first Mesozoic lizard to have been discovered on the Korean peninsula. Initially classified as a possible monstersaurian, Asprosaurus has been subsequently suggested to be a probable mosasauroid, an extinct group of marine lizards during the Late Cretaceous.

== Discovery and naming ==
The holotype of Asprosaurus (KDRC-BB4) is an associated specimen consisting of partial cranial and postcranial material. Initially interpreted as a turtle fossil, it was discovered in 2000 from the Seonso Conglomerate, one of the rock units that form the Boseong Bibong-ri Dinosaur Egg Site which also yielded the fossils of an ornithischian dinosaur Koreanosaurus and over 200 dinosaur eggs.

The generic name means "white lizard", named so because the fossil bones of the holotype were light in color, while Mesozoic fossil bones of the Korean peninsula are usually dark. The specific name is in reference to "bibongri", the type locality where the holotype was found. Because Asprosaurus is known only from fragmentary material, its relationships with other lizards are uncertain. However, features of the lower jaw suggest that it is an anguimorph, so the authors tentatively classified it as cf. Monstersauria, a clade which includes the living Gila monster.

In 2016, a potential second specimen (KDRC-BB5) was identified as Asprosaurus sp. This specimen is a partial skull donated in 2008 from an uncertain stratigraphic level within the same locality where the holotype of Asprosaurus was discovered. The specimen exhibits synapomorphies of Varanoidea and Monstersauria, and is the only known lizard skull fossil with preserved teeth in South Korea.

== Description ==
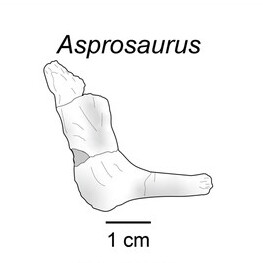
Jugal postorbital process of Asprosaurus

Asprosaurus has an estimated skull length of 18–20 cm (7.1–7.9 in). It is probably larger than Chianghsia, whose skull length is estimated up to 17.5–18 cm (6.9–7.1 in) in total and the snout-vent length around 1–1.25 m (3 ft 3 in – 4 ft 1 in). The jugal of Asprosaurus preserves an angulated orbital margin, but lacks osteoderms and differs in shape from that of the Chinese monstersaurian Zhongyuanxi.

== Paleobiology ==
Various genera of large anguimorph lizards from the Late Cretaceous including Asprosaurus have been found in close proximity to the dinosaur eggs, so it is possible that these lizards are nest raiders. Asprosaurus might have been able to dig into nests using powerful forelimb muscles, which is inferred based on the morphology of the scapulocoracoid and humerus. If Asprosaurus instead represents a mosasauroid, it would have been either a fully aquatic or a semiaquatic lizard.

== Classification ==
In 2015, the describers of Asprosaurus initially classified this taxon within Monstersauria. In their 2025 description of the new Late Cretaceous monstersaurian Bolg amondol, Woolley and colleagues included Asprosaurus in a strictly morphology-based phylogenetic analysis, which recovered Asprosaurus within Mosasauroidea, forming a clade with Aigialosaurus and Eonatator. The authors suggested that this result is unsurprising, as Asprosaurus lacks complete, diagnostic characters of monstersaurians, though they noted the uncertainty of its taxonomic affinities within Anguimorpha. The results of the morphology-based phylogenetic analysis are displayed in the cladogram below:

- - Mosasauroidea
    - Asprosaurus bibongriensis
    - Aigialosaurus dalmaticus
    - Eonatator sternbergii
  - Platynota
    - †Paranecrosaurus feisti
    - - Varanoidea
      - - †Saniwides mongoliensis
        - - - †Parviderma inexacta
            - †Parasaniwa wyomingensis
          - Monstersauria
            ⊞
            - †Morohasaurus kamitakiensis
            - - †Gobiderma pulchrum
              - †Bolg amondol
            - - †Labrodioctes montanaensis
              - †Primaderma nessovi
              - †Paraderma bogerti
              - - †Palaeosaniwa canadensis
                - - - †Chianghsia nankangensis
                    - †Estesia mongoliensis
                  - - Heloderma horridum (Mexican beaded lizard)
            ⊟
