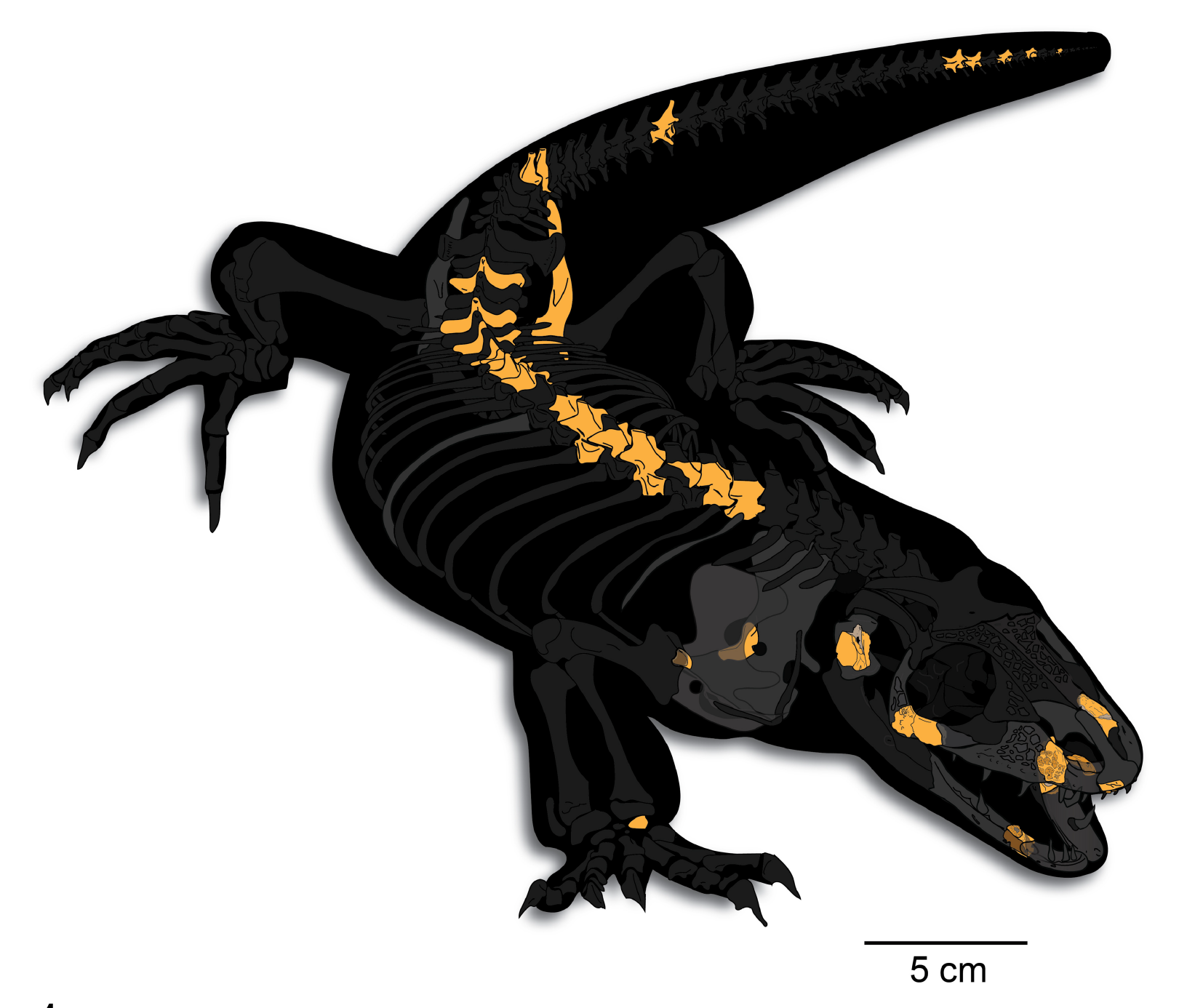
- Reconstructed skeleton with known material in gold

Scientific classification
- Kingdom: Animalia
- Phylum: Chordata
- Class: Reptilia
- Order: Squamata
- Suborder: Anguimorpha
- Clade: Monstersauria
- Genus: †Bolg; Woolley et al., 2025
- Species: †B. amondol

Binomial name
- †Bolg amondol Woolley et al., 2025

= Bolg amondol =

Bolg amondol Temporal range: Late Cretaceous (late Campanian), ~76.4–75.6 Ma

Species of fossil lizards

Bolg amondol is an extinct species of monstersaurian lizard from the Late Cretaceous (Campanian age) Kaiparowits Formation of Utah, United States. B. amondol is the only species in the genus Bolg, known from a partial skeleton including bones of the skull, limbs, girdles, and vertebral column.

== Discovery and naming ==
The Bolg holotype specimen, UMNH VP 16266, was discovered by Joseph Sertich in 2005 in outcrops of the middle Kaiparowits Formation ('Fossil Ridge' locality) in Grand Staircase–Escalante National Monument of southern Utah, United States. The specimen consists of a fragmentary but associated skeleton likely belonging to a single individual, comprising cranial and limb bones, vertebrae, and elements from the pectoral and pelvic girdles. The identifiable skull bones are mostly incomplete, but include the premaxilla, right maxilla, left nasal, right jugal, right vomer, left palatine, right quadrate, and both dentaries. Thoracic, lumbar, and caudal vertebrae are also known, as well as parts of both scapulocoracoids, the left ilium, a metapodial (potentially a radiale, and several associated fragments.

In 2025, C. Henrik Woolley and colleagues described Bolg amondol as a new genus and species of monstersaurian lizards based on these fossil remains. The generic name, Bolg, references the goblin of the same name in J. R. R. Tolkien's The Hobbit. The authors chose to name this taxon after a goblin to allude to its affinities with the clade Monstersauria. The specific name, amondol, is derived from Sindarin, the fictional language spoken by elves in Tolkien's works. It combines the prefix amon-, meaning "mound", with the suffix -dol, meaning "head", referencing the moundlike osteoderms covering the skull bones.

== Description ==
Woolley et al. (2025) identified ridges on two of the preserved caudal (tail) vertebrae. These ridges run perpendicular to the long axis of the centra. Based on comparisons with modern living lizards, the researchers identified these ridges as autotomy septa, which would allow Bolg to shed its tail if attacked or under stress. Some of the skull bones bear osteoderms fused to the outer surfaces.

== Classification ==
In their 2025 description of Bolg, Woolley et al. included this taxon in both a genomics-based phylogenetic analysis and another strictly based on morphology. Both analyses recognized Bolg as a member of the Monstersauria, the clade of lizards including the extant genus Heloderma (the Gila monster and beaded lizards). The genome-based analysis placed Bolg in an unresolved polytomy with other fossil monstersaurians, while the morphology-based analysis recovered it as the sister taxon to Gobiderma, a Mongolian genus from the Djadokhta Formation. The results of the latter analysis are displayed in the cladogram below:

- - Varanoidea
  - - †Saniwides mongoliensis
    - - - †Parviderma inexacta
        - †Parasaniwa wyomingensis
      - Monstersauria
        - †Morohasaurus kamitakiensis
        - - †Gobiderma pulchrum
          - †Bolg amondol
        - - †Labrodioctes montanaensis
          - †Primaderma nessovi
          - †Paraderma bogerti
          - - †Palaeosaniwa canadensis
            - - - †Chianghsia nankangensis
                - †Estesia mongoliensis
              - - Heloderma horridum (Mexican beaded lizard)
