= Zhongyuanxi =

Zhongyuanxi Temporal range: Late Cretaceous, Maastrichtian

Scientific classification
- Kingdom: Animalia
- Phylum: Chordata
- Class: Reptilia
- Order: Squamata
- Suborder: Anguimorpha
- Infraorder: Paleoanguimorpha
- Genus: †Zhongyuanxi; Xu et al., 2025
- Species: †Z. jiai

Binomial name
- †Zhongyuanxi jiai Xu et al., 2025

Extinct lizard genus

Zhongyuanxi (lit. 'Zhongyuan lizard') is an extinct genus of anguimorph lizard known from the Late Cretaceous (likely Maastrichtian age) Qiupa Formation of China. The genus contains a single species, Zhongyuanxi jiai, known from a partial skull.

== Discovery and naming ==
The Zhongyuanxi fossil material was discovered in 2013 outcrops of the 'Haoping site' of the Qiupa Formation (Tantou Basin) in Luanchuan County of Henan Province, China. The specimen, preserved in a block of reddish mudstone, is housed in the Henan Natural History Museum, where it is permanently accessioned as specimen HNHM 41HIII0727. It consists of a partial skull, lacking the posterior (rear) region and mandible.

In 2025, Li Xu and colleagues described Zhongyuanxi jiai as a new genus and species of anguimorph lizard based on these fossil remains, establishing HNHM 41HIII0727 as the holotype specimen. The generic name, Zhongyuanxi, combines a reference to the Zhongyuan region of China—centered around Henan Province, where the only known specimen was found—with the Chinese 蜥 (xi), meaning 'lizard'. The specific name, jiai, honors Jia Songhai and his contributions to vertebrate paleontology in Henan, China.

== Description ==
The skull of the holotype specimen measures around 3 centimetres (1.2 in) as preserved, but is missing the premaxilla at the front and several bones at the rear. The skull roof, jugal, and lacrimal feature a scattered sculpturing of tubercules similar in morphology to that seen in immature individuals of the Mongolian Gobiderma. The preserved sub-rectangular osteoderms are isolated, implying this individual was not fully mature when it died. The maxilla has between nine and ten widely-spaced tooth positions, the largest of which are toward the front. The preserved dentition comprises long, recurved teeth with pleurodont implantation. The replacement teeth are similar in form to the functional teeth.

The vomer bones of the palate are long and narrow, bearing an arrangement of two rows of small, pointed teeth. Vomer teeth, while common in early lepidosauromorphs and stem-reptiles, are rare in crown group squamates; the only living lizard with vomerine teeth is the functionally legless Pseudopus (sheltopusik), with only a few fossil species known with them, such as the scincomorph Eoscincus and the anguimorphs Eosaniwa and Paranecrosaurus, which are more closely related to Zhongquanxi. Like the vomers, the palatines have roughly two rows of teeth.

== Classification ==
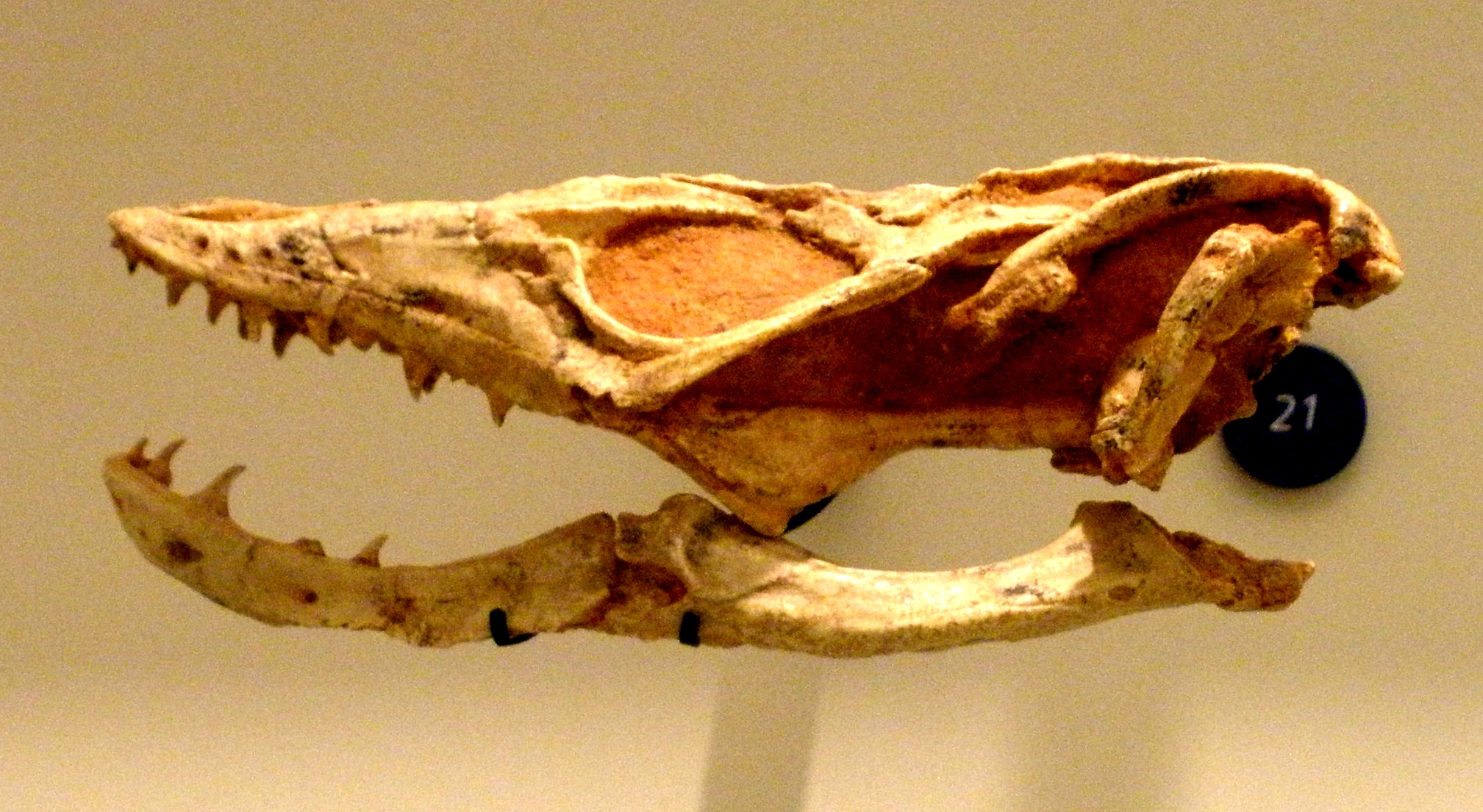
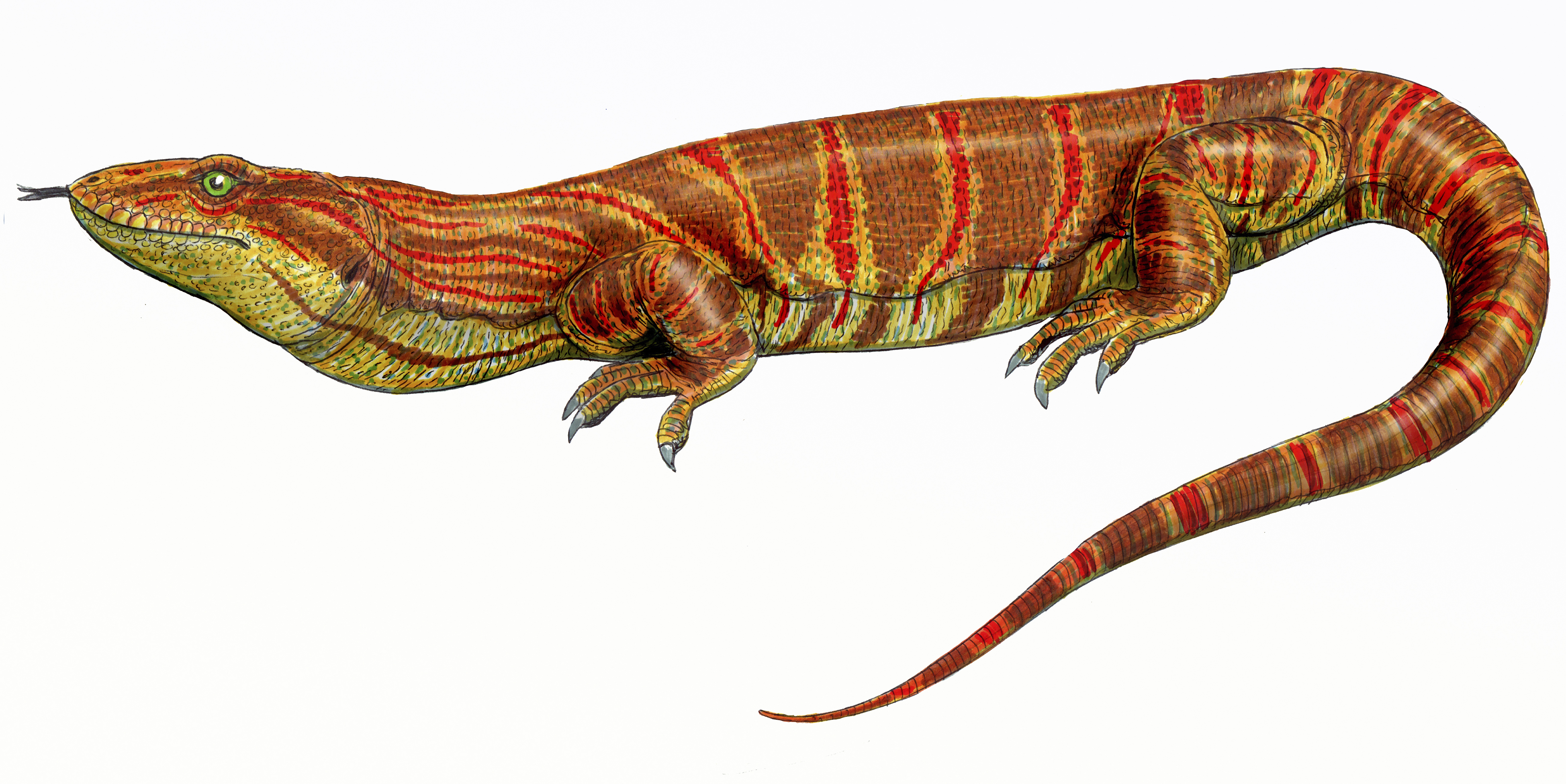
Skull cast (top) and life restoration (bottom) of Estesia, a probable close relative from Mongolia

To test the affinities and relationships of Zhongyuanxi, Xu et al. (2025) included it in an updated version of the phylogenetic matrix of Tałanda (2022). Using constraints following the relationships of extant taxa established by molecular data, Zhongyuanxi was recovered as the sister taxon to the Mongolian Aiolosaurus. This relationship was found based on the shared presence of a premaxillary-maxillary fenestra present in both genera, but this grouping may be unreliable due to the intraspecific variability of this character. Together, Zhongyuanxi and Aiolosaurus are more closely related to varanids and lanthanotids (including modern monitor lizards) than to shinisaurians within the Paleoanguimorpha lineage of anguimorph lizards. These results are displayed in the cladogram below:

- Anguimorpha
  - Paleoanguimorpha
    - Shinisauridae
    - - †Gobiderma pulchrum
      - - - †Aiolosaurus oriens
          - †Zhongyuanxi jiai
        - - †Estesia mongoliensis
          - - †Saniwa
            - Lanthanotidae
            - Varanidae
  - Neoanguimorpha
    - Helodermatidae
    - - Xenosauridae
      - - - †Helodermoides tuberculatus
          - †Peltosaurus granulosus
        - - Anguioidea
