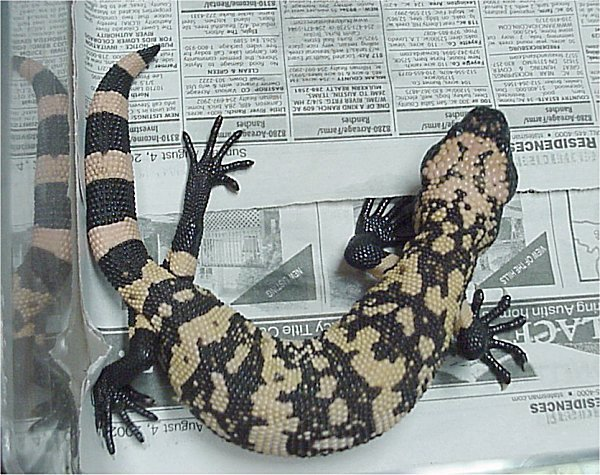
- Gila monster, Heloderma suspectum

Scientific classification
- Kingdom: Animalia
- Phylum: Chordata
- Class: Reptilia
- Order: Squamata
- Suborder: Anguimorpha
- Infraorder: Neoanguimorpha
- Clade: Monstersauria; Norell and Gao, 1997

Subgroups
- †Asprosaurus?; †Bolg; †Chianghsia?; †Estesia?; †Eurheloderma?; †Gobiderma?; †Lowesaurus?; †Morohasaurus?; †Palaeosaniwa?; †Paraderma?; †Primaderma?; Helodermatidae

= Monstersauria =

Monstersauria Temporal range: Albian–Recent

Clade of lizards

Monstersauria is a clade of anguimorph lizards, defined as all taxa more closely related to Heloderma than Varanus. It includes Heloderma, as well as several extinct genera, such as Estesia, Primaderma and Gobiderma, but this group was found to be polyphyletic in the most recent and complete squamate phylogenetic analysis by Reeder et al. (2015).

== Classification ==
Traditionally, Monstersauria was thought to include the modern Helodermatidae along with fossil genera such as Gobiderma and Estesia on the finding that it was a sister to Varanidae. But in more recent years, such as 2004 and 2008, more precise molecular studies have shown that the extant Heloderma is closer to Anguidae and kin than to Varanoidea. A large-scale integrated analysis on squamate phylogeny incorporating 737 characters of morphological and molecular data in 2015 analyzed the traditionally-monstersaurian fossil taxa along with the rest of the dataset, and what it found was a well-supported separation of the extinct monstersaurians from the extant Heloderma. In total, three different possibilities exist: either Heloderma is sister to the rest of Neoanguimorpha and fossil monstersaurians nest within Varanoidea (based on molecular and combined data; optimal arrangement); they both nest with each other in Neoanguimorpha (unlikely possibility based on parsimony analysis of combined data), or they both nest with each other in Varanoidea (based on morphology only). The most likely tree chosen by the authors, based on the combined dataset of 691 morphological characters and 46 molecular characters across 210 operational taxonomic units, is as shown, focusing on Anguimorpha:

- Squamata
  - ~†Huehuecuetzpalli
  - - ~†Eichstaetisaurus
    - - - Dibamidae
        - Gekkota
      - - Scincomorpha
        - - Lacertoidea
            - Amphisbaenia
            - Teiidae
          - Toxicofera
            - - †Mosasauria
              - Serpentes
            - - - †Polyglyphanodontia
                - Iguania
              - Anguimorpha
                - Paleoanguimorpha
                  - Shinisauridae
                  - - †Gobiderma
                    - - †Aiolosaurus
                      - †Estesia
                    - Varanoidea sensu Lee 1997
                      - Lanthanotus
                      - Varanidae sensu Estes 1998
                        - †Saniwa
                        - Varanus
                - Neoanguimorpha
                  - Monstersauria
                    Heloderma
                  - Diploglossa
                    - Xenosauridae
                    - Anguioidea
                      - †Glyptosauridae
                      - Diploglossidae
                      - - Anniellidae
                        - Anguidae
