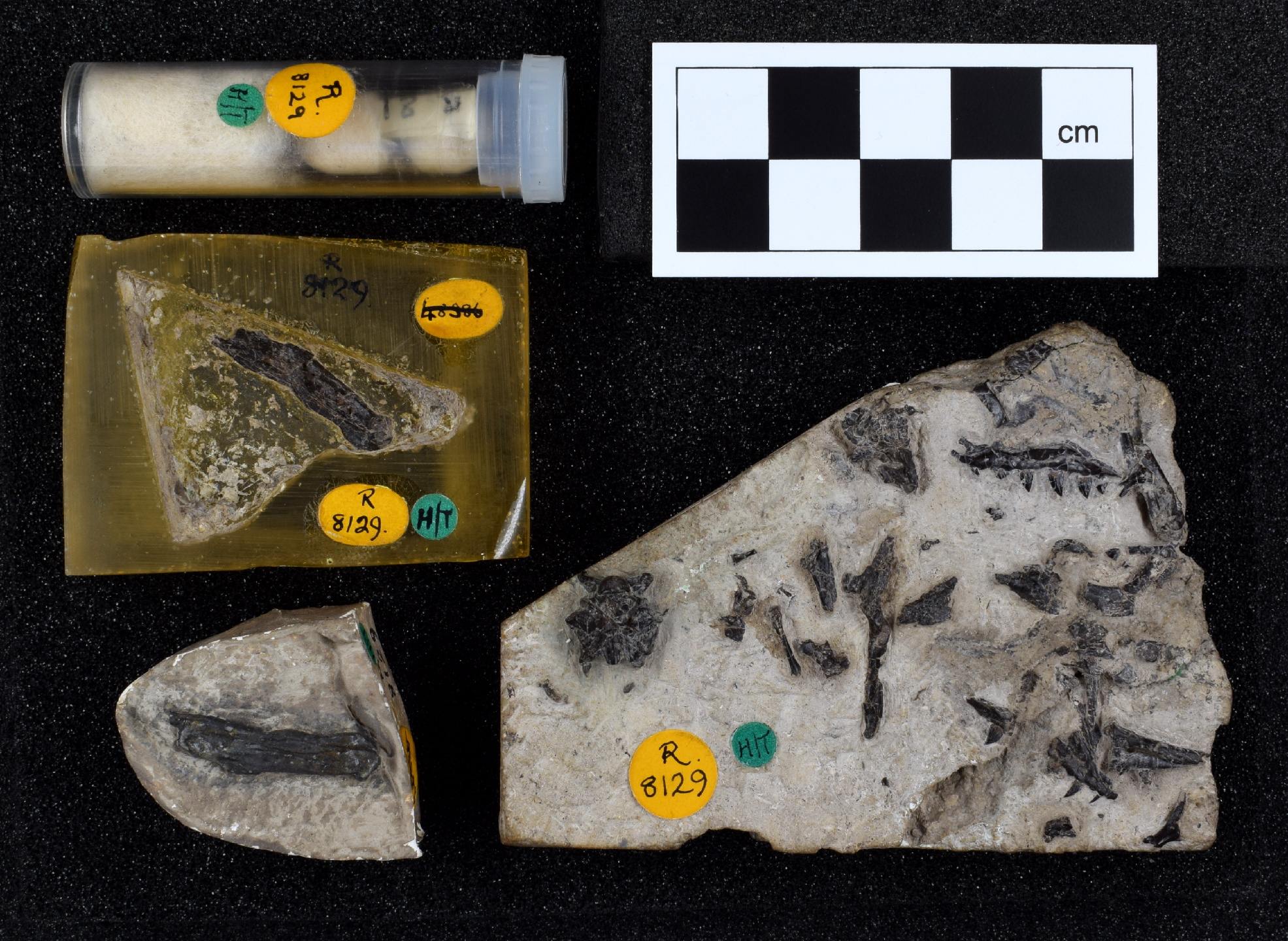
- Dorsetisaurus purbeckensis, NHMUK PV R 8129

Scientific classification
- Kingdom: Animalia
- Phylum: Chordata
- Class: Reptilia
- Order: Squamata
- Suborder: Anguimorpha
- Infraorder: Neoanguimorpha
- Clade: Diploglossa
- Clade: Anguioidea
- Family: †Dorsetisauridae
- Genus: †Dorsetisaurus; Hoffstetter, 1967

Species
- D. hebetidens; D. purbeckensis

= Dorsetisaurus =

Dorsetisaurus Temporal range: Kimmeridgian–Albian

Extinct genus of lizards

Dorsetisaurus is a genus of extinct lizard, known from the Late Jurassic of North America, and the Late Jurassic-earliest Cretaceous of Europe. The genus was first reported from the Early Cretaceous (Berriasian) Lulworth Formation of the Purbeck Group of Durlston Bay, in Dorset. It has also been reported from the Late Jurassic aged Alcobaça Formation of Portugal, the Aptian-Albian Dzunbain Formation of Mongolia, and the Morrison Formation of Western North America present in stratigraphic zones 2, 4, and 5. It is considered the oldest widely accepted member of Anguimorpha, based on the presence of 11 shared synapomorphies.

== See also ==
- Paleobiota of the Morrison Formation
