= Judeasaurus =

Judeasaurus Temporal range: Cenomanian Late Cretaceous

Scientific classification
- Kingdom: Animalia
- Phylum: Chordata
- Class: Reptilia
- Order: Squamata
- Suborder: Anguimorpha
- Superfamily: Varanoidea
- Genus: †Judeasaurus; Haber & Polcyn, 2005

Species
- J. tchernovi

Extinct genus of lizards

Judeasaurus is an extinct genus of small, aquatic varanoid lizard related to the mosasauroids. The only known specimen is from the Late Cretaceous of the Judean Hills and the West Bank though its exact provenance is uncertain.

== Description ==
The specimen consists of an incomplete but partly articulated skull and a number of cervical vertebrae exposed in ventral view on a small slab of pink-grey limestone. The skull includes a fragmentary right maxilla (with teeth), the co-ossified frontals and parietals, right jugal, postorbitofrontals, supratemporals, squamosals, quadrates, the right dentary and fragmentary postdentary bones; the occipital region of the skull is hidden beneath a calcareous deposit. Some elements, such as the jugals, are preserved only as impressions. The skull is small, measuring only 60–70 millimeters in length.

== History ==
There is some doubt surrounding the provenance of the holotype and only known specimen (HUJI P4000, Hebrew University of Jerusalem), though it was likely recovered from the Judea Group, either from the upper Laminated Limestone Member of the Kefar Sha'ul Formation (Upper Cenomanian) or the lower member of the Bina Formation (Lower Turonian), based on an examination of the lithology of the limestone matrix and planktonic fossil foraminifera preserved in the same slab.

== Taxonomy and naming ==
The genus is named for the Judean Hills where the holotype of Judeasaurus tchernovi was discovered ("Judea lizard"), and the etymology of the species name honours Eitan Tchernov for his contributions to the paleontology of Israel.

Haber and Polcyn (2005, p. 249) diagnose Judeasaurus tchernovi as a varanoid lizard:

distinguished from other varanoids by the conical shape of the parietal process of the supratemporal and the way it is nested syndesmotically within the lateral wall of the parietal suspensorial ramus, and by the following unique combination of characters: broad premaxilla, nasal capsule floored by the anterior part of the maxilla, postorbitofrontal-parietal contact at least as extensive postorbitofrontal-frontal contact, suspensorial arcade is almost vertical, concave 'question-mark'-shaped quadrate with well-developed suprastapedial process and tympanic ala, fused frontals, M-shaped frontoparietal suture, weakly developed descending processes of the frontal, moderately retracted nares, closely spaced teeth with narrow bases, 14-16 mandibular teeth, no plicidentine.

Haber and Polcyn (2005, 251-254) compare Judeasaurus with other marine varanoids (Adriosaurus and Pontosaurus), basal mosasauroids (including Tethysaurus, Haasiasaurus, and Halisaurus) and with members of the paraphyletic Aigialosauridae, and determined that Judeasaurus "represents a new taxon within Varanoidea, related to mosasauroids based on its fused frontals and circular quadrate." An affiliation with another group of Late Cretaceous marine varanoids, the Dolichosauridae, is proposed but this relationship remains unresolved due to the poorly understood nature of dolichosaurs.
