= Bolg =

Bolg may refer to:

- Bolg (Middle-earth), a fictional goblin in The Hobbit
- Bolg (lizard), a prehistoric genus of lizards named for the fictional goblin
