= Dryadissector =

Dryadissector Temporal range: Late Cretaceous, 82–80 Ma

Scientific classification
- Domain: Eukaryota
- Kingdom: Animalia
- Phylum: Chordata
- Class: Reptilia
- Order: Squamata
- Superfamily: Varanoidea
- Genus: †Dryadissector; Wick et al., 2015

Type species
- †Dryadissector shilleri Wick et al., 2015

Extinct genus of lizards

Dryadissector (meaning "Dryad dissector" in Greek) is an extinct genus of varanoid lizard represented by the type species Dryadissector shilleri from the Late Cretaceous of Texas. Dryadissector is known only from isolated teeth, which may have been shed by living individuals. These teeth are common in early Campanian strata within the Aguja Formation, which date back about 82 to 80 million years. The teeth of Dryadissector are extremely similar to those of theropod dinosaurs, which led to them initially being misidentified as the remains of theropods. Like theropod teeth, the teeth of Dryadissector are recurved, laterally compressed, and serrated. However, their lizard affinities are made evident by serrations that are smaller and more numerous than those of theropods, as well as a bulge on the inner surface of the base of each tooth that is characteristic of varanoids.

In most Late Cretaceous fossil assemblages where varanoids and theropods coexist (e.g. the Foremost and Oldman formations in Alberta, where the varanoid Palaeosaniwa is found alongside theropods like Saurornitholestes), varanoids are a rare component of the fauna and their teeth are greatly outnumbered by those of theropods. By contrast, in the lower Aguja Formation. the teeth of Dryadissector outnumber those of all theropod species combined. The lower Aguja may therefore preserve a rare ecosystem in which varanoid lizards outcompeted small theropods as the dominant mesopredators.
