= Eurheloderma =

Eurheloderma Temporal range: Eocene

Scientific classification
- Kingdom: Animalia
- Phylum: Chordata
- Class: Reptilia
- Order: Squamata
- Suborder: Anguimorpha
- Family: Helodermatidae
- Genus: †Eurheloderma; Hoffstetter, 1957

Type species
- †Eurheloderma gallicum Hoffstetter, 1957

Genus of reptiles

Eurheloderma is an extinct genus of heloderm lizard known from the late Eocene of France.

It is the oldest confirmed member of Helodermatidae.
