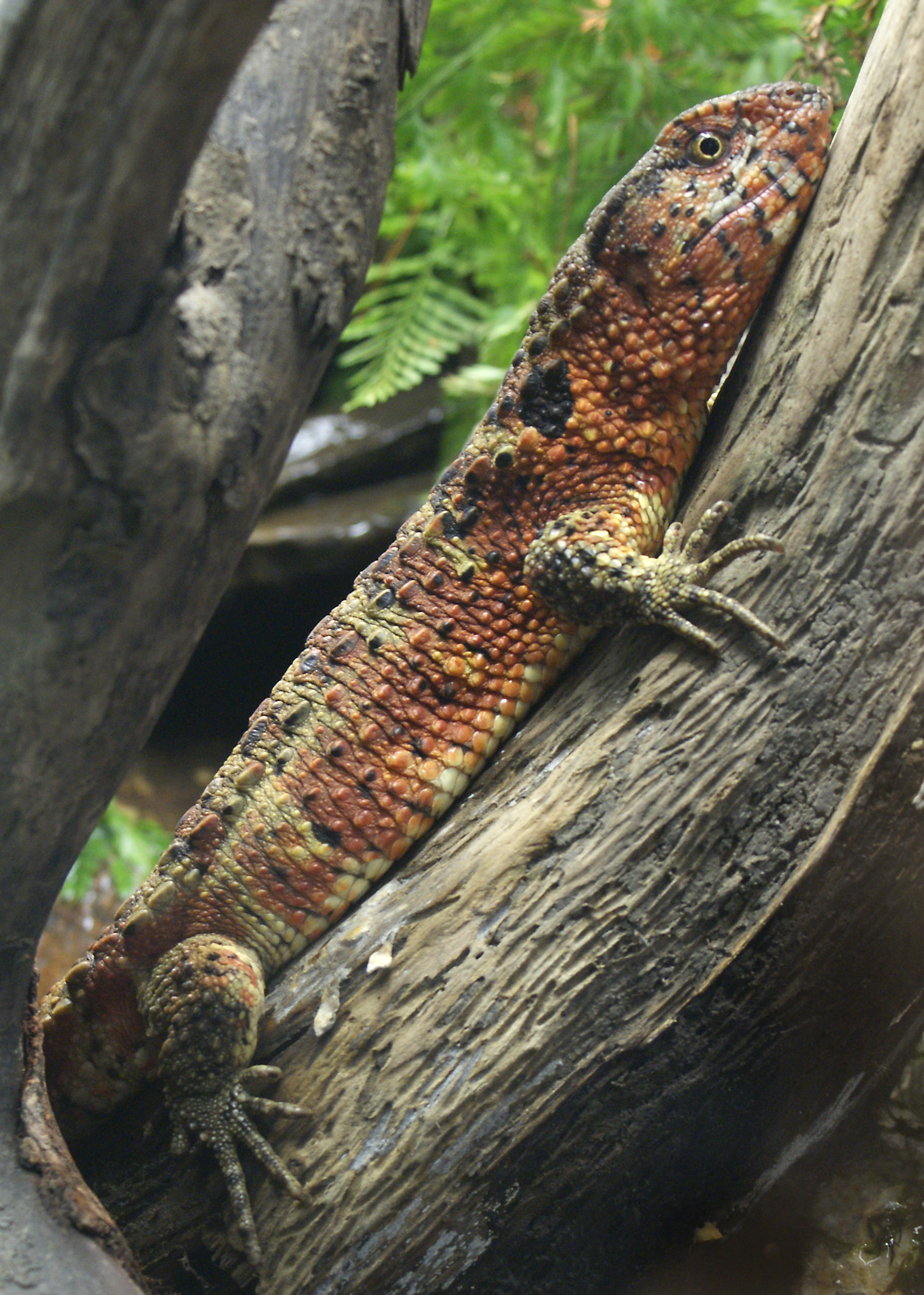
- Chinese crocodile lizard (Shinisaurus crocodilurus)
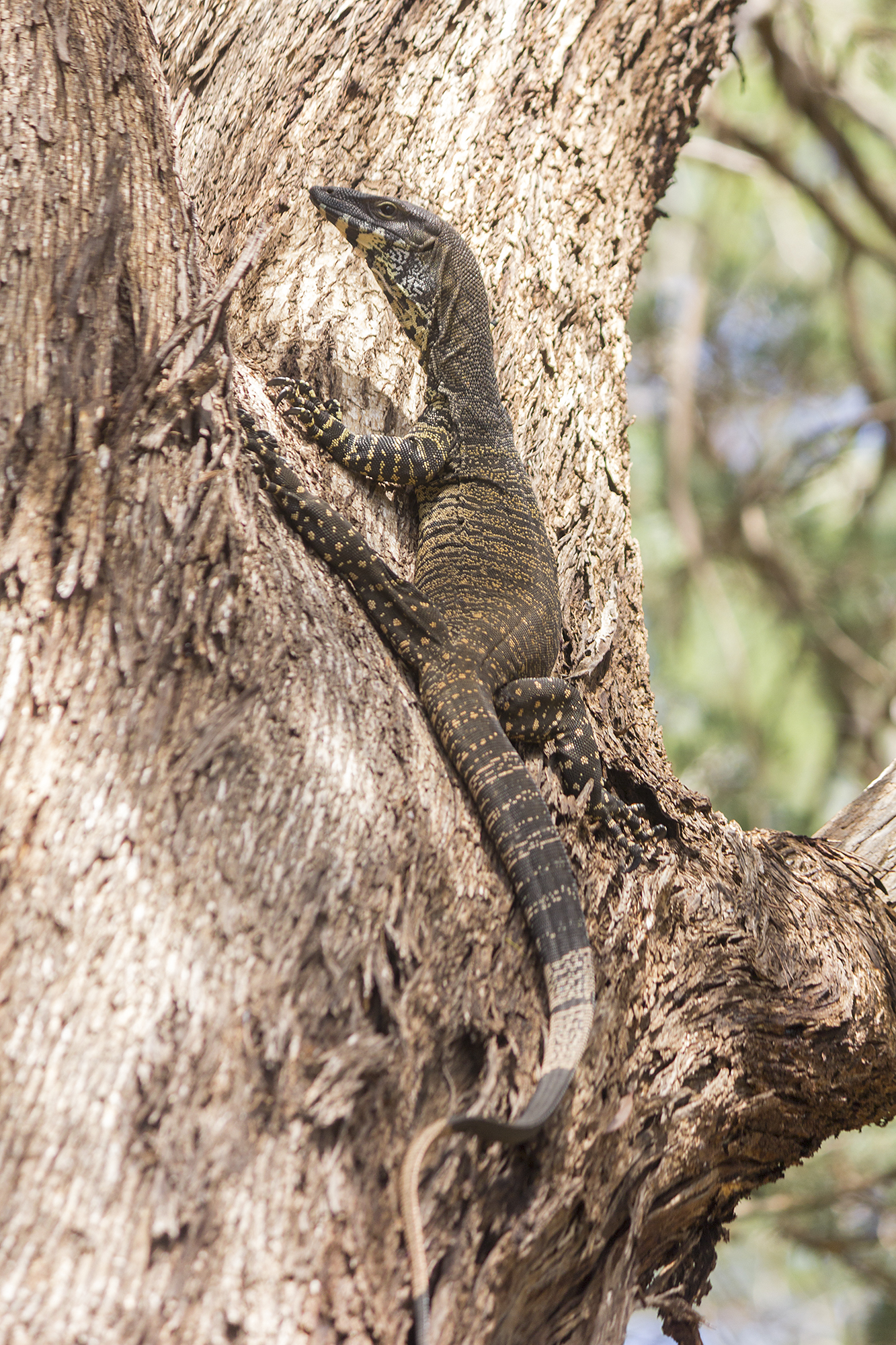
- Lace monitor (Varanus varius)

Scientific classification
- Kingdom: Animalia
- Phylum: Chordata
- Class: Reptilia
- Order: Squamata
- Suborder: Anguimorpha
- Infraorder: Paleoanguimorpha

Subclades
- Shinisauria; Goannasauria; †Aiolosaurus?; †Estesia?; †Gobiderma?; †Palaeosaniwa?; †Zhongyuanxi; Varanoidea

= Paleoanguimorpha =

Paleoanguimorpha Temporal range: Aptian – Present, 125–0 Ma

Clade of lizards

Paleoanguimorpha is a clade of anguimorphs comprising Shinisauria (represented today by shinisaurids) and Goannasauria (represented today by Varanoidea which includes the families Lanthanotidae and Varanidae). Morphological studies in the past also classified helodermatids and pythonomorphs with the varanoids in the clade Platynota, while the Chinese crocodile lizard was classified as a xenosaurid. Current molecular work finds no support in these groupings and instead has found the helodermatids more related to Diploglossa in the sister clade Neoanguimorpha, while the Chinese crocodile lizard is the closest living relative to varanoids. Pythonomorphs represented by snakes today are not closely related to varanoids and are instead a sister lineage to Anguimorpha and Iguania in the clade Toxicofera.

Below is the phylogeny of the paleoanguimorph lineages after Pyron et al. (2013):

- Paleoanguimorpha
  - Shinisauria
    Shinisauridae (Chinese crocodile lizard)
  - Varanoidea
    - Lanthanotidae (earless monitor lizard)
    - Varanidae (monitor lizards)

== See also ==
- Neoanguimorpha
- Platynota
