= Arcanosaurus =

Arcanosaurus Temporal range: Early Cretaceous

Scientific classification
- Domain: Eukaryota
- Kingdom: Animalia
- Phylum: Chordata
- Class: Reptilia
- Order: Squamata
- Superfamily: Varanoidea
- Genus: †Arcanosaurus; Houssaye et al., 2012

Type species
- †Arcanosaurus ibericus Houssaye et al., 2012

Extinct genus of lizards

Arcanosaurus is an extinct genus of varanoid lizard from the Early Cretaceous of Spain. It is known from 29 vertebrae that were found disarticulated but close together in a fossil locality called Viajete in the province of Burgos. The bones were found within a layer of the Castrillo de la Reina Formation, which dates back to the late Barremian and early Aptian stages of the Early Cretaceous. The vertebrae of Arcanosaurus share several features in common with those of other varanoid lizards, but they lack bony projections called posterior hypapophyses that are found in nearly all other varanoids.
