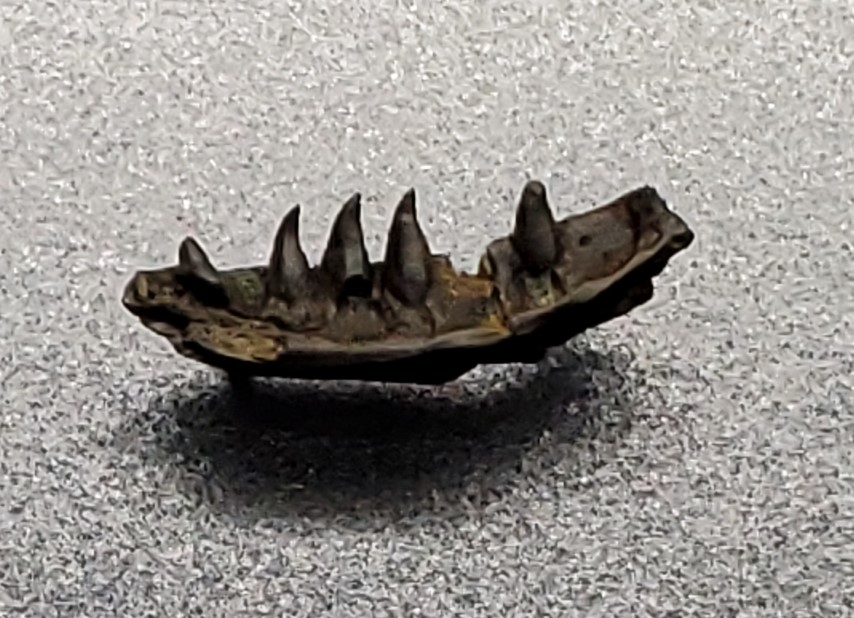

Scientific classification
- Kingdom: Animalia
- Phylum: Chordata
- Class: Reptilia
- Order: Squamata
- Suborder: Anguimorpha
- Genus: †Palaeosaniwa
- Species: †P. canadensis

Binomial name
- †Palaeosaniwa canadensis Gilmore, 1928

Synonyms
- Megasaurus robustus Gilmore, 1928

= Palaeosaniwa =

Palaeosaniwa Temporal range: Late Cretaceous 70.6–66.0 Ma Possible Paleocene record

Extinct genus of lizards

Palaeosaniwa is an extinct genus of carnivorous lizard from the Late Cretaceous of North America. The type (and only) species, Palaeosaniwa canadensis, given by Charles Whitney Gilmore in 1928, means "ancient Saniwa from Canada".

== Description ==
Palaeosaniwa is among the largest terrestrial lizards known from the Mesozoic era, with an estimated body mass of 6 kg (13 lb) and a snout–vent length about 82 cm (32 in). Its total body length would have been around 1–2 m (3 ft 3 in – 6 ft 7 in), smaller than the adult Komodo dragon and other Mesozoic lizards of East Asia (Asprosaurus and Chianghsia). Some specimens attributed to cf. P. canadensis is estimated to have skull length up to 15 centimetres (5.9 in) which is comparable to a young specimen of komodo dragon around 1.6 m (5.2 ft) long. It is similar to modern varanid lizards (particularly the Komodo dragon) in having bladelike teeth with minute serrations. These teeth would have been effective for seizing and cutting large prey items, and suggest that Palaeosaniwa fed on other vertebrates. Adult Palaeosaniwa would have been large enough to prey on any of the avialans or mammals known from the time, small non-avian dinosaurs, and the eggs and juveniles of large dinosaurs.

== Distribution ==
Palaeosaniwa was originally described from the late Campanian of Alberta. More recently it has been reported from the late Campanian of Montana, and the late Maastrichtian of Montana and Wyoming. It is known primarily from isolated teeth and vertebrae, but two partial skeletons have also been discovered. The type species, P. canadensis, is from Alberta. Although the Maastrichtian Palaeosaniwa has traditionally been referred to this species, it succeeds it by roughly ten million years. Given the distance in time between these animals, they are likely to represent distinct species, but the available fossils are too incomplete to be certain.

== Relationships ==
Palaeosaniwa is a member of the Platynota, a group that includes the monitor lizards (Varanidae) and Gila monsters (Helodermatidae). Originally, it was thought to be a member of the Varanidae, but has also been interpreted as a relative of the Helodermatidae. The most recent analysis places Palaeosaniwa outside of either Varanidae or Helodermatidae, as a stem member of the Varanoidea. Its precise affinities remain poorly understood, but it may be related to other Late Cretaceous, North American carnivorous lizards such as Parasaniwa, Paraderma, Labrodioctes, and Cemeterius.
