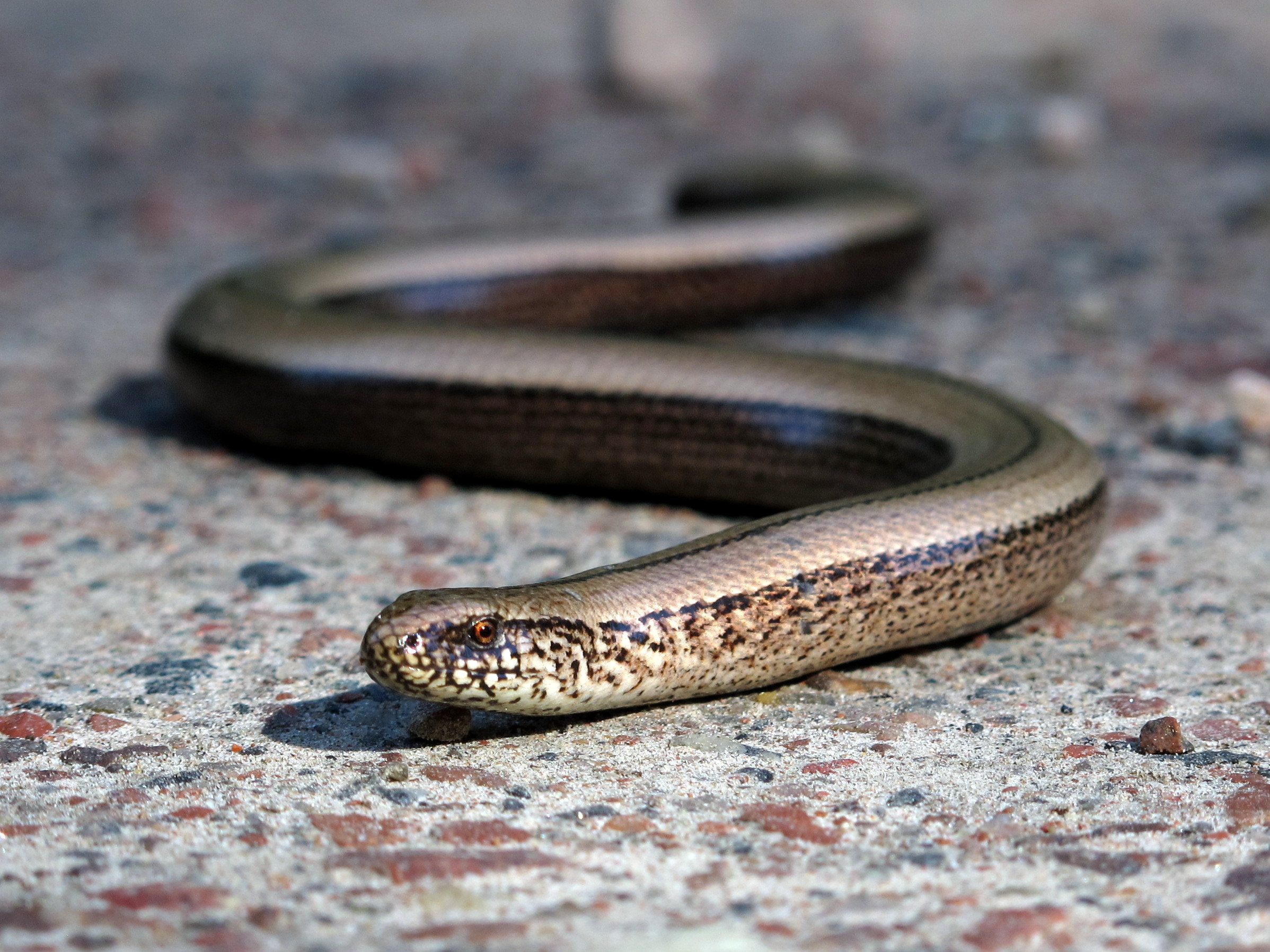
- Slowworm (Anguis fragilis)
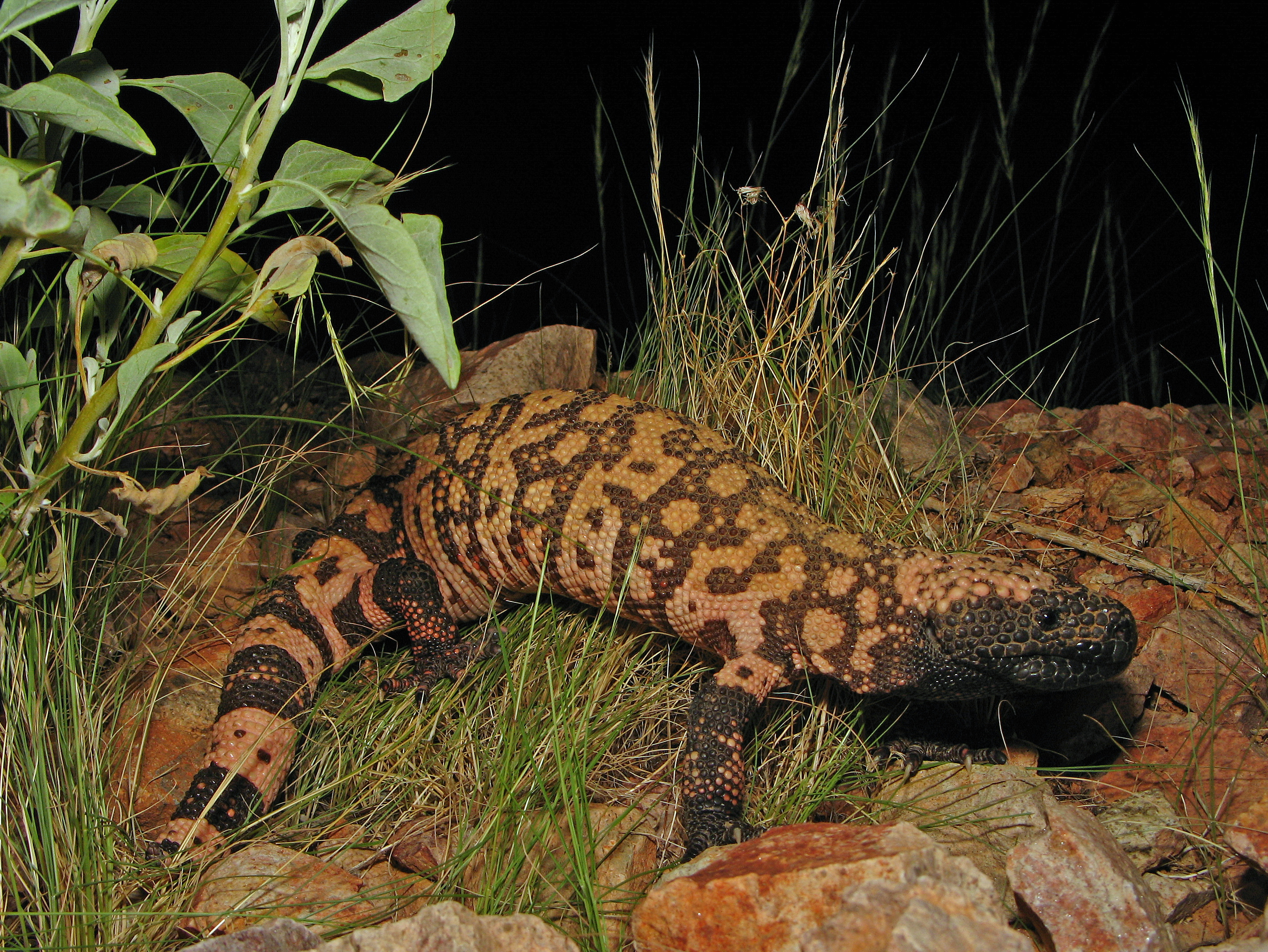
- Gila Monster (Heloderma suspectum)

Scientific classification
- Kingdom: Animalia
- Phylum: Chordata
- Class: Reptilia
- Order: Squamata
- Suborder: Anguimorpha
- Infraorder: Neoanguimorpha

Subclades
- Monstersauria; Diploglossa

= Neoanguimorpha =

Neoanguimorpha Temporal range: Albian – Present, 105–0 Ma

Clade of lizards

Neoanguimorpha is a clade of anguimorphs comprising Monstersauria (represented today by helodermatids) and Diploglossa (Xenosauridae and Anguioidea). Morphological studies in the past had classified helodermatids with the varanoids in the clade Platynota, while the Chinese crocodile lizard was classified as a xenosaurid. However molecular work found no support in these groupings and instead has found the helodermatids more related to Diploglossa, while the Chinese crocodile lizard and varanoids to form the clade Paleoanguimorpha.

Below is the phylogeny of the neoanguimorph lineages after Pyron et al. (2013):

- Neoanguimorpha
  - Helodermatidae (beaded lizards and Gila monster)
  - Diploglossa
    - Xenosauridae (knob-scaled lizards)
    - Anguioidea
      - Diploglossidae (galliwasps)
      - - Anniellidae (American legless lizards)
        - Anguidae (glass lizards and alligator lizards)

== See also ==
- Paleoanguimorpha
