= Labrodioctes =

Labrodioctes Temporal range: Campanian

Scientific classification
- Kingdom: Animalia
- Phylum: Chordata
- Class: Reptilia
- Order: Squamata
- Suborder: Anguimorpha
- Family: Helodermatidae
- Genus: †Labrodioctes; Gao & Fox, 1996

Type species
- †Labrodioctes montanensis Gao & Fox, 1996

Extinct genus of lizards

Labrodioctes is an extinct genus of helodermatid lizard from the Campanian of Montana and Alberta. It was named in 1996 by Gao Kequin and Richard C. Fox as Labrodioctes montanensis, combining the Ancient Greek words Labros and dioktes as "greedy hunter". It is known from jaw and skull bones from the Judith River and Oldman Formations, and is substantially larger than related helodermatid Paraderma.
