= Lowesaurus =

Lowesaurus Temporal range: Oligocene

Scientific classification
- Kingdom: Animalia
- Phylum: Chordata
- Class: Reptilia
- Order: Squamata
- Suborder: Anguimorpha
- Family: Helodermatidae
- Genus: †Lowesaurus; Pregill, Gauthier & Greene, 1986
- Species: †L. matthewi

Binomial name
- †Lowesaurus matthewi (Gilmore, 1928)

Synonyms
- Heloderma matthewi Gilmore, 1928

Extinct genus of heloderm lizard

Lowesaurus is an extinct genus of heloderm lizard known from the Oligocene of the United States.
