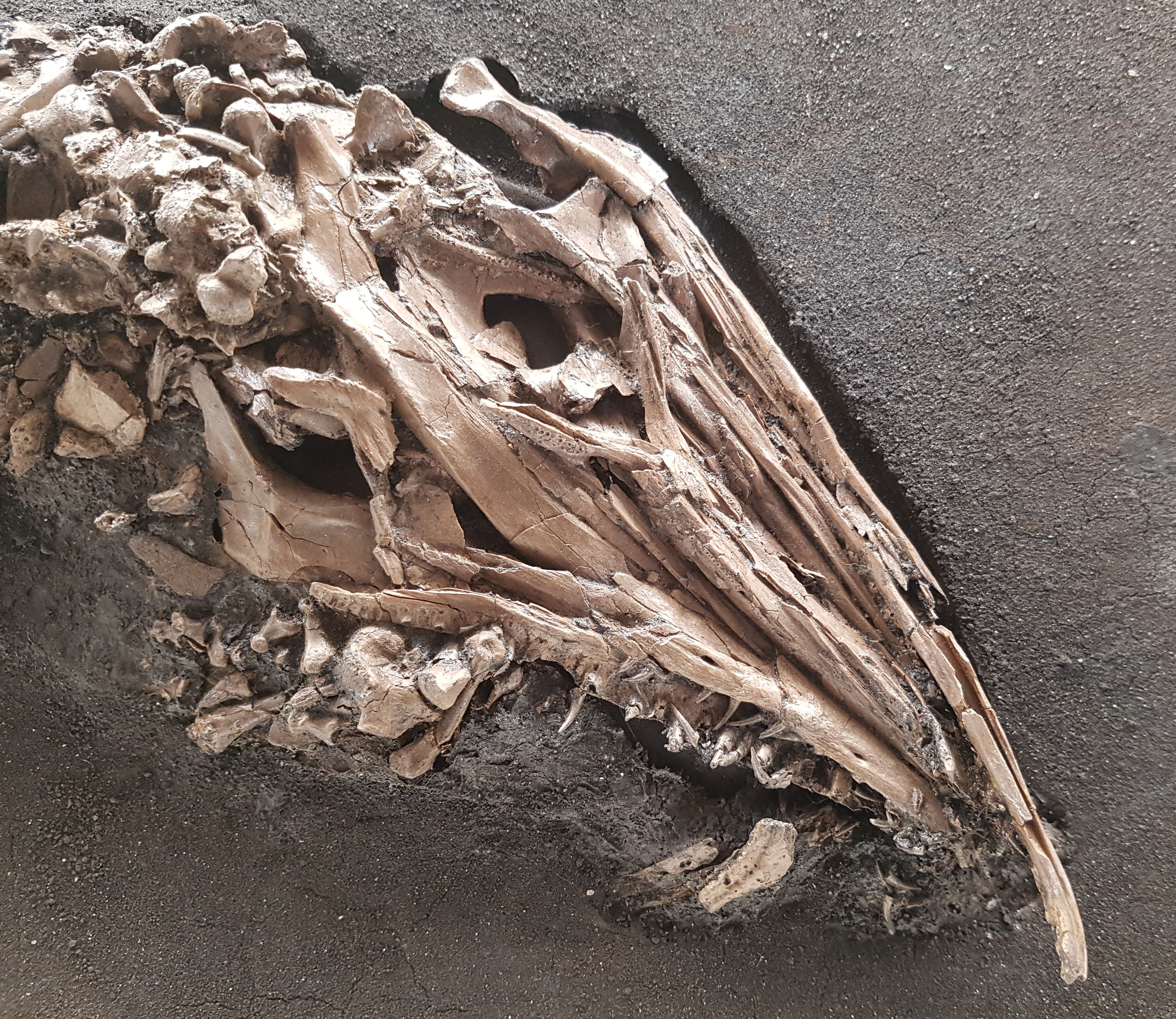

Scientific classification
- Kingdom: Animalia
- Phylum: Chordata
- Class: Reptilia
- Order: Squamata
- Suborder: Anguimorpha
- Family: †Palaeovaranidae
- Genus: †Eosaniwa; Haubold, 1977

Type species
- †Eosaniwa koehni Haubold, 1977

= Eosaniwa =

Eosaniwa Temporal range: Eocene

Extinct genus of lizards

Eosaniwa is an extinct genus of lizard from the Middle Eocene Geiseltal fossil deposits of Germany. It contains a single species, Eosaniwa koehni, and is placed in the family Palaeovaranidae.
