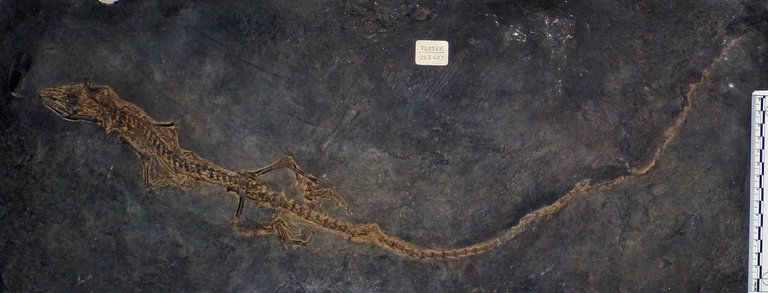

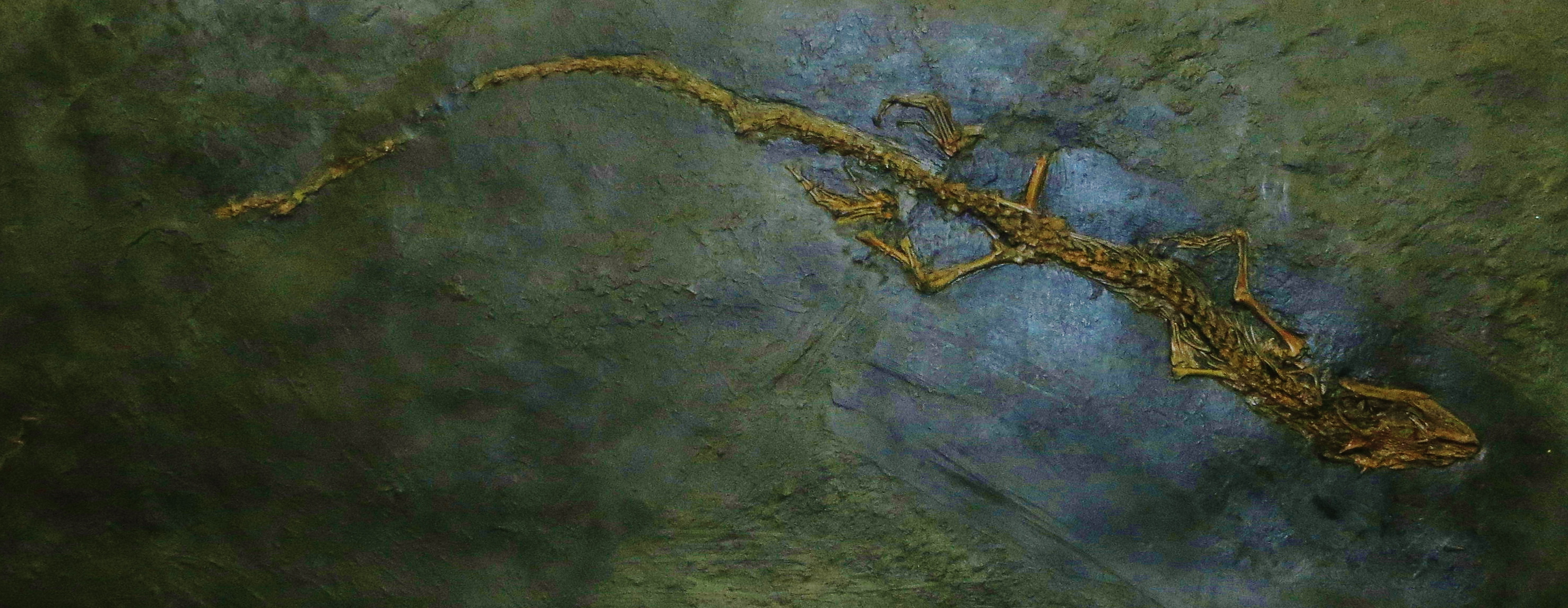
- Palaeovaranus cayluxensis (top) and Paranecrosaurus feisti (bottom)

Scientific classification
- Kingdom: Animalia
- Phylum: Chordata
- Class: Reptilia
- Order: Squamata
- Suborder: Anguimorpha
- Superfamily: Varanoidea
- Family: †Palaeovaranidae; Georgalis, 2017

Genera
- Eosaniwa Haubold, 1977; Palaeovaranus Zittel, 1887; Paranecrosaurus Smith & Habersetzer, 2021

Synonyms
- Necrosauridae Hoffstetter, 1943

= Palaeovaranidae =

Palaeovaranidae Temporal range: Paleocene–Early Oligocene

Extinct reptilian clade

Palaeovaranidae, formerly known as Necrosauridae, is an extinct clade of anguimorph lizards known from the Paleogene of Europe. They have sometimes been recovered as members of Varanoidea. It contains three genera.

== Genera ==
- Eosaniwa Haubold, 1977 Geiseltal, Germany, Eocene
- Palaeovaranus Zittel, 1887 (Formerly Necrosaurus) Messel Pit, Germany, Quercy Phosphorites Formation, France, Eocene
- Paranecrosaurus Smith & Habersetzer, 2021 (Formerly "Saniwa" feisti) Messel Pit, Germany, Eocene
