= Seonso Conglomerate =

Geologic formation in South Korea

- Stratigraphic range: Campanian; 81 Ma
- Type: Geological formation
- Underlies: Seonso Formation
- Overlies: Unconformity
- Thickness: 200 meters

Lithology
- Primary: Conglomerate
- Other: Sandstone, mudstone

Location
- Coordinates: 34.7°N 127.2°E
- Approximate paleocoordinates: 39.0°N 115.8°E
- Region: South Jeolla
- Country: South Korea

Type section
- Named for: Seonso Village, Boseong
- Named by: Hwang and Cheong, 1968
- Seonso Conglomerate (South Korea)

The Seonso Conglomerate (Korean: 선소역암) is a Late Cretaceous aged geologic formation in South Korea. Fossils of dinosaurs and lizards are reported from the formation at the Bibong-ri Dinosaur Egg Site in Boseong County.

== Fauna ==
=== Dinosaurs ===
Genus	Species	Material	Notes
Faveoolithus	sp.	Eggs	Ootaxon laid by a sauropod.
Spheroolithus	sp.	Eggs	Ootaxon laid by a hadrosaur or other ornithopod.
Coralloidoolithus	sp.	Eggs	
Koreanosaurus	boseongensis	Postcrania	An ornithopod.
Dinosauria ident	sp.		

=== Squamata ===
Genus	Species	Material	Notes
Asprosaurus	bibongriensis	"cranial and postcranial material"	A large carnivorous lizard.

== See also ==
- List of dinosaur-bearing rock formations
- List of stratigraphic units with dinosaur trace fossils
- Dinosaur eggs
