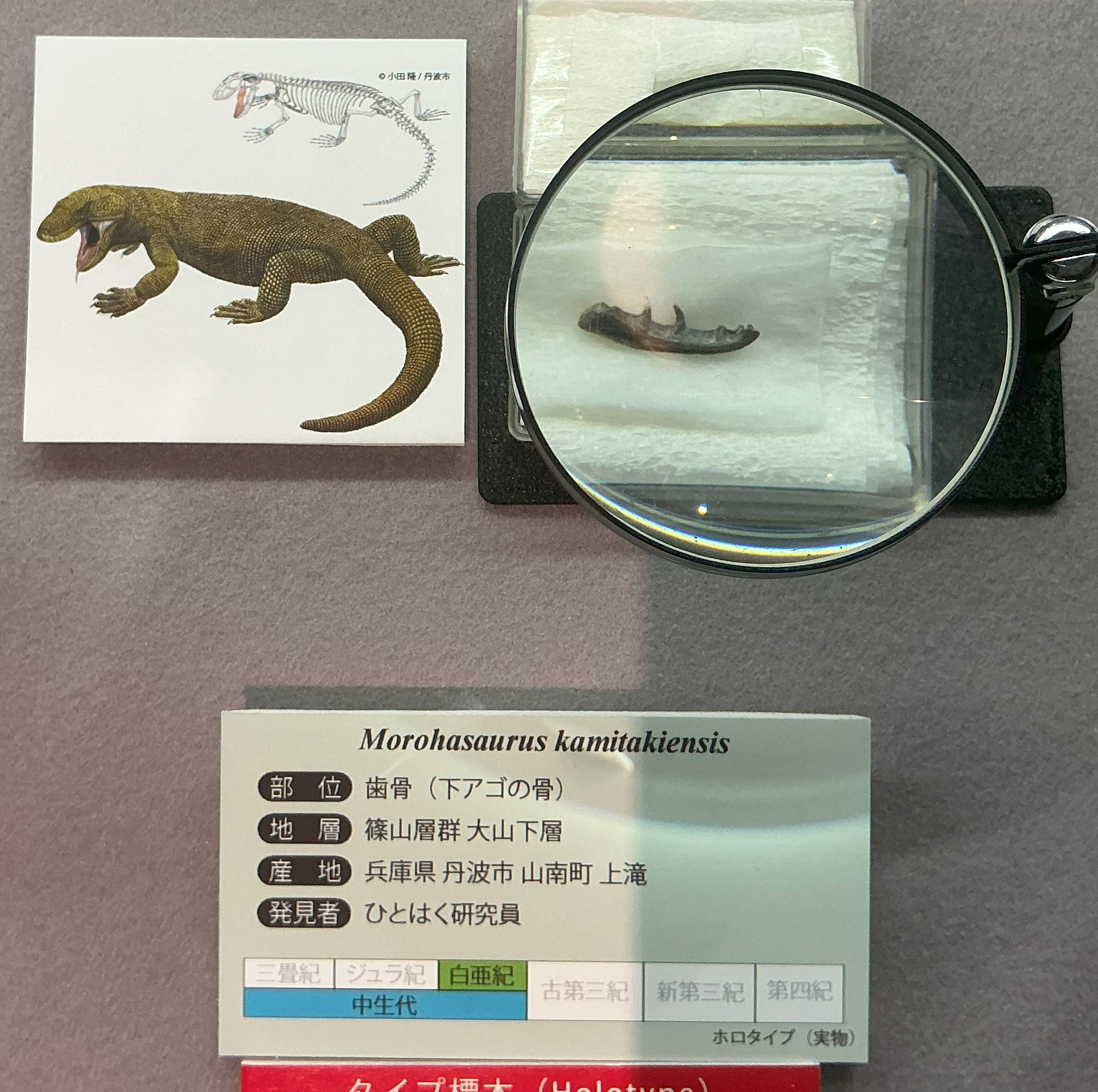
- Holotype

Scientific classification
- Kingdom: Animalia
- Phylum: Chordata
- Class: Reptilia
- Order: Squamata
- Suborder: Anguimorpha
- Clade: Monstersauria
- Genus: †Morohasaurus; Ikeda et al., 2021

Type species
- †Morohasaurus kamitakiensis Ikeda et al., 2021

= Morohasaurus =

Morohasaurus Temporal range: Albian ~112.1–106.4 Ma

Fossil genus of squamates

Morohasaurus is an extinct genus of cf. monstersaurian squamates know from a single left dentary from the Early Cretaceous (?Albian) Ohyamashimo Formation of the Sasayama Group in Tamba City, Hyogo Prefecture, Japan. The type and only species is Morohasaurus kamitakiensis.

As of 2021, Ikeda et al. place this taxon a conferatur within Monstersauria based on general synapomorphies but without performing a phylogenetic analysis. The unique characters described in the paper to distinguish Morohasaurus kamitakiensis as a valid species include "the sinuous posteroventral rim of the dentary with a large U-shaped upper notch and small V-shaped lower notch, posteroventral corner of intramandibular septum with a weakly pointed eminence projecting posteriorly, and unicuspid, curved trenchant teeth with distinct blade-like carinae on their mesial and distal sides without grooves or serrations." If its presumed affinities are correct, Morohasaurus represents the oldest known monstersaurian to date.
