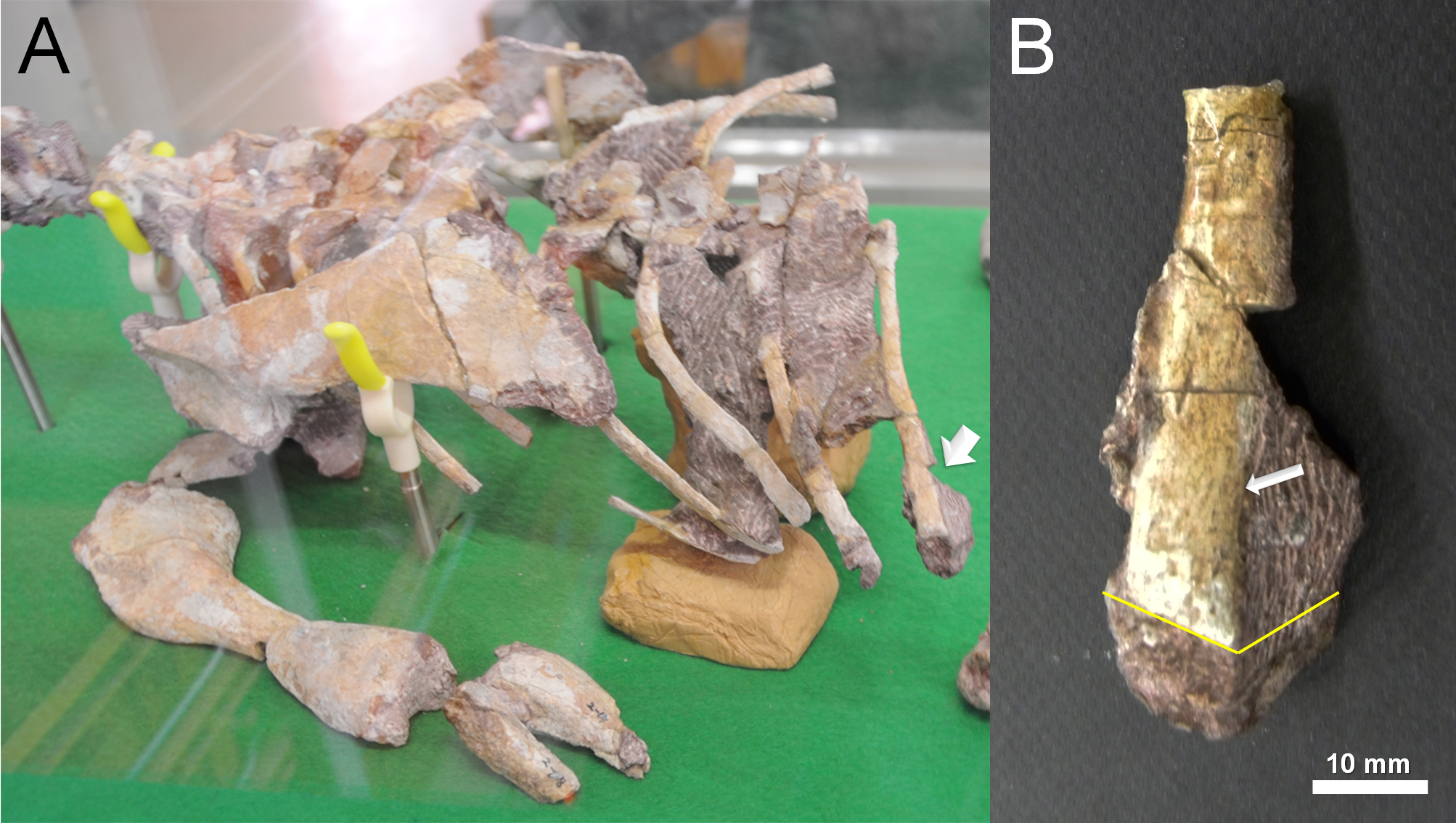
- Fossil holotype

Scientific classification
- Kingdom: Animalia
- Phylum: Chordata
- Class: Reptilia
- Clade: Dinosauria
- Clade: †Ornithischia
- Family: †Thescelosauridae
- Subfamily: †Orodrominae
- Genus: †Koreanosaurus; Huh et al., 2011
- Species: †K. boseongensis

Binomial name
- †Koreanosaurus boseongensis Huh et al., 2011

= Koreanosaurus =

Koreanosaurus Temporal range: Campanian, 81 Ma

Extinct genus of dinosaurs

Koreanosaurus (lit. 'Korean lizard') is a genus of orodromine neornithischian dinosaur that lived during the Campanian stage of the Late Cretaceous of what is now South Korea. One species has been described, Koreanosaurus boseongensis.

== Discovery ==
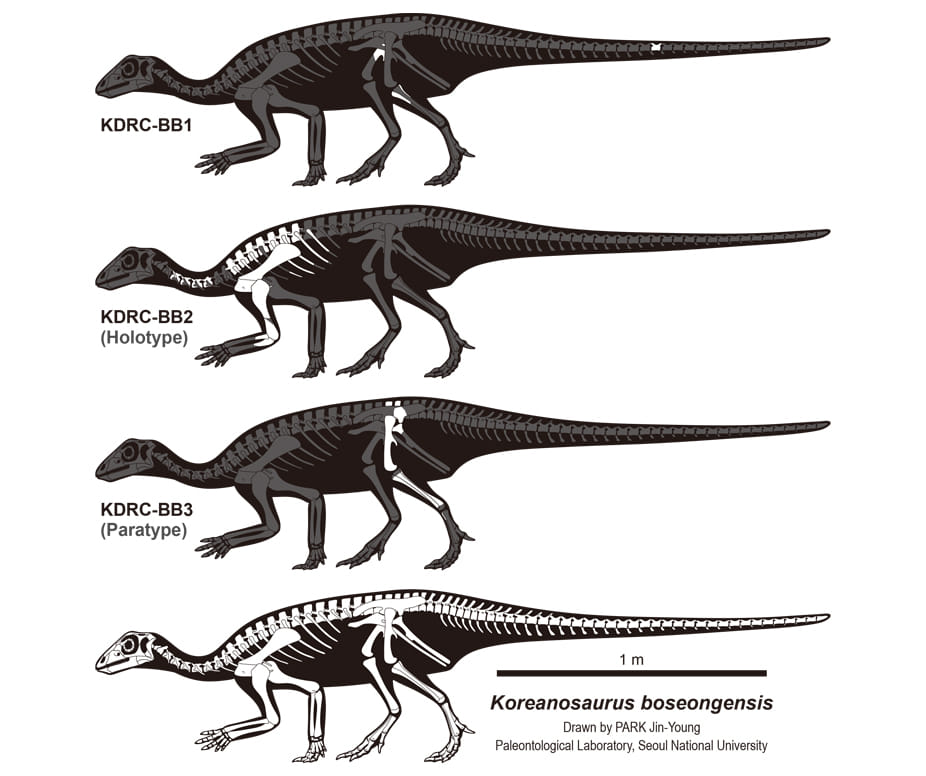
Skeletal diagram

In 2003, three specimens of Koreanosaurus were found in the Upper Cretaceous Seonso Conglomerate from the southern coast of the Bibong-ri dinosaur egg site, Boseong, Korean Peninsula. These specimens include the holotype KDRC-BB2, a partial upper skeleton lacking the skull, and two additional specimens which contains portions of the pelvic girdle and lower leg (KDRC-BB1 and KDRC-BB3). The type species was named after its locality (Boseong site 5). This taxon was initially named and described in a master's thesis by Dae-Gil Lee in 2008, and was officially published by Min Huh, Dae-Gil Lee, Jung-Kyun Kim, Jong-Deock Lim and Pascal Godefroit in 2011.

== Description ==
Koreanosaurus was a relatively small dinosaur, reaching 2–2.4 meters (6.6–7.9 ft) in body length. Based on its taxonomic position and the existence of small burrows from the Seonso Conglomerate, Koreanosaurus is likely a burrowing dinosaur. Unlike its orodromine relatives, Koreanosaurus is assumed to have been a quadruped.

== Classification ==
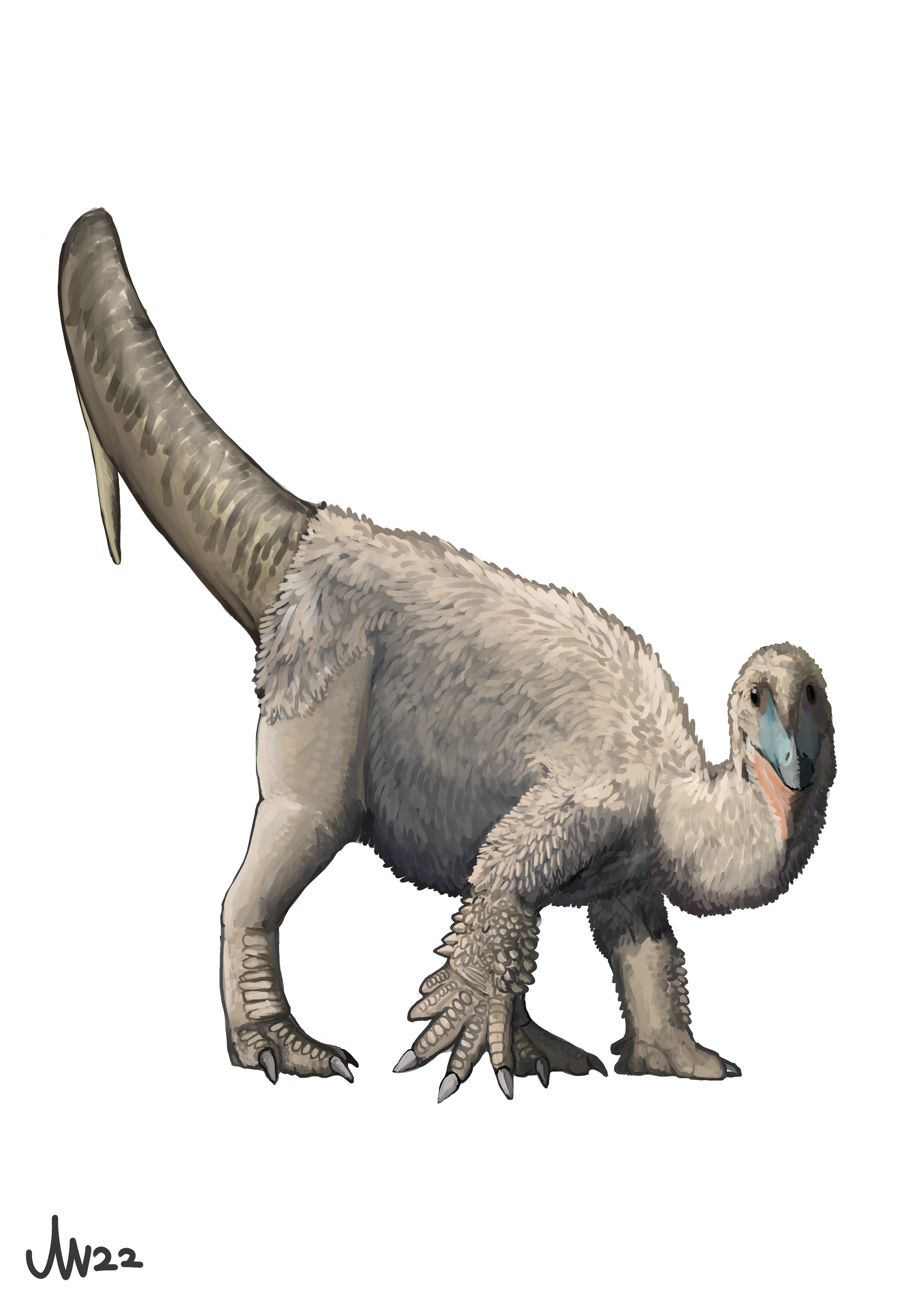
Life reconstruction

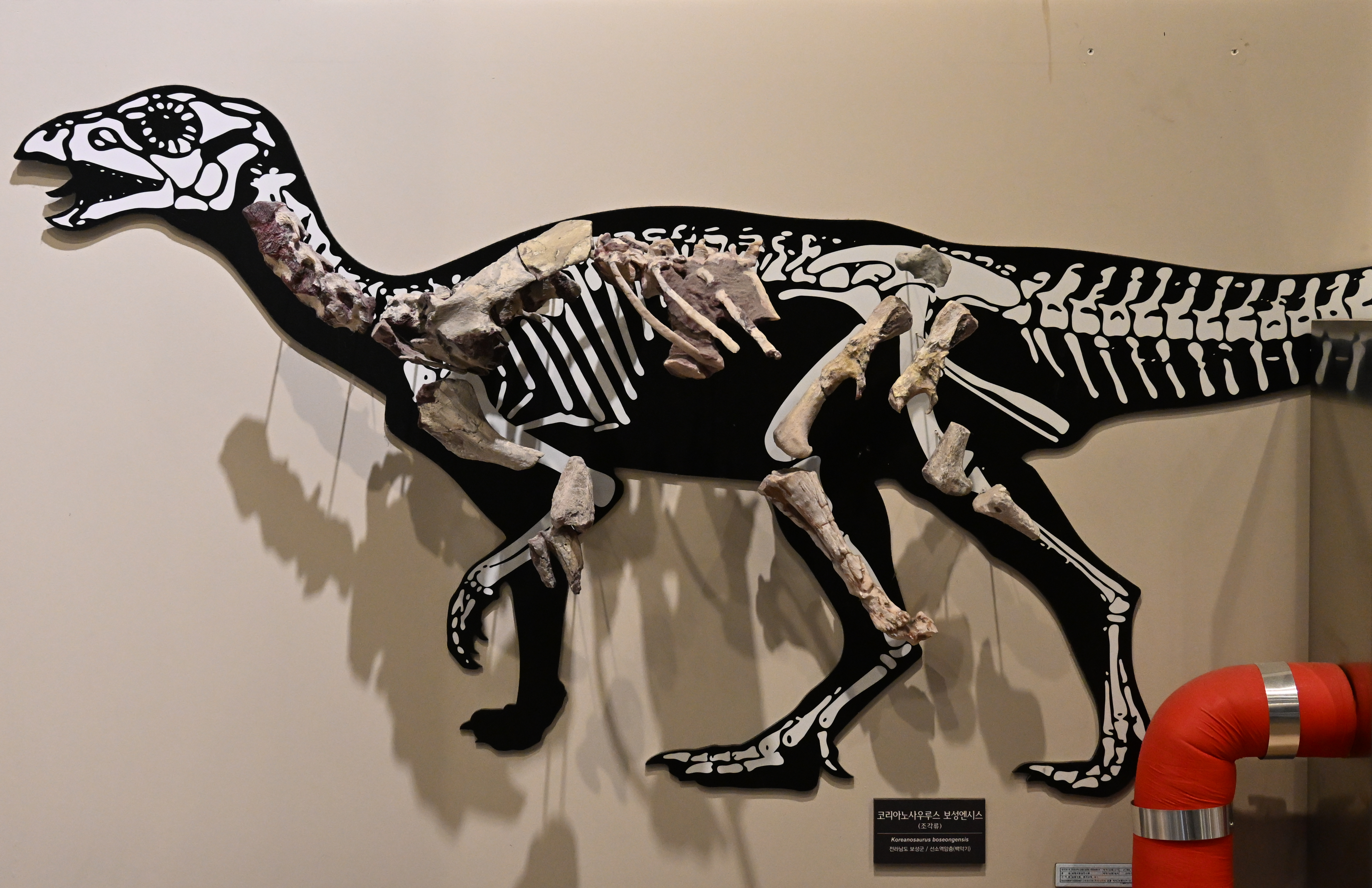
Fossil replica

Koreanosaurus was considered to be a basal member of the Ornithopoda by the authors, forming a clade with Zephyrosaurus schaffi, Orodromeus makelai and Oryctodromeus cubicularis from which they deduced a burrowing lifestyle. In 2012, Han et al. found it plausible that Koreanosaurus might be a member of Jeholosauridae or closely related to it. Subsequent phylogenetic analyses by researchers including Han et al. consistently classified Koreanosaurus as a member of Thescelosauridae, specifically within the subfamily Orodrominae.

== See also ==
- Koreaceratops
