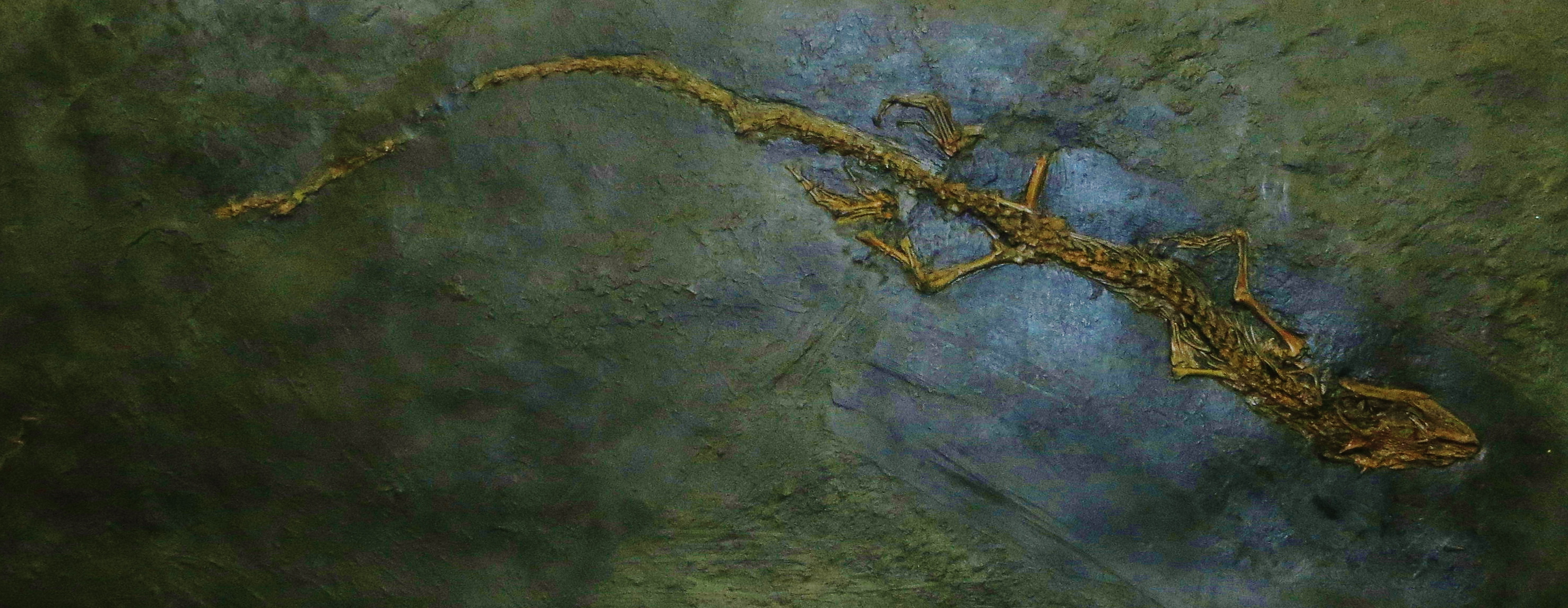

Scientific classification
- Domain: Eukaryota
- Kingdom: Animalia
- Phylum: Chordata
- Class: Reptilia
- Order: Squamata
- Family: †Palaeovaranidae
- Genus: †Paranecrosaurus; Smith & Habersetzer, 2021

Type species
- †Paranecrosaurus feisti Smith & Habersetzer, 2021 (Stritzke, 1983)

Synonyms
- Saniwa feisti Stritzke 1983

= Paranecrosaurus =

Paranecrosaurus Temporal range: Eocene

Extinct genus of lizards

Paranecrosaurus is an extinct genus of lizard from the Eocene Messel Pits of Germany. It contains a single species, Paranecrosaurus feisti, originally described as a species of Saniwa. It was carnivorous, as indicated by the presence of the lizard Cryptolacerta as stomatch contents. It is placed in the family Palaeovaranidae.
