= Parasaniwa =

Parasaniwa Temporal range: Late Cretaceous, Maastrichtian

Scientific classification
- Domain: Eukaryota
- Kingdom: Animalia
- Phylum: Chordata
- Class: Reptilia
- Order: Squamata
- Family: †Palaeovaranidae
- Genus: †Parasaniwa; Gilmore, 1928

Type species
- †Parasaniwa wyomingensis Gilmore, 1928

Synonyms
- Parasaniwa obtusa Gilmore, 1928

Extinct genus of lizards

Parasaniwa is an extinct genus of necrosaurid lizard from the Late Cretaceous of the western United States.

== Description ==
It was named in 1928 by Charles W. Gilmore for jaw and skull bones found in the Lance Formation and Hell Creek Formation of Wyoming and Montana. Gilmore also named the species P. obtusa in 1928, but it is now considered a junior synonym, separated by features caused by erosion. Additional specimens were referred to Parasaniwa from the Lower Eocene Bridger Formation, but additional material from the Wasatch Formation instead suggests that this belongs to a separate genus Parasaniwa is considered closely related to Necrosaurus as a member of Necrosauridae, though it has at times been kept in a separate family Parasaniwidae.
