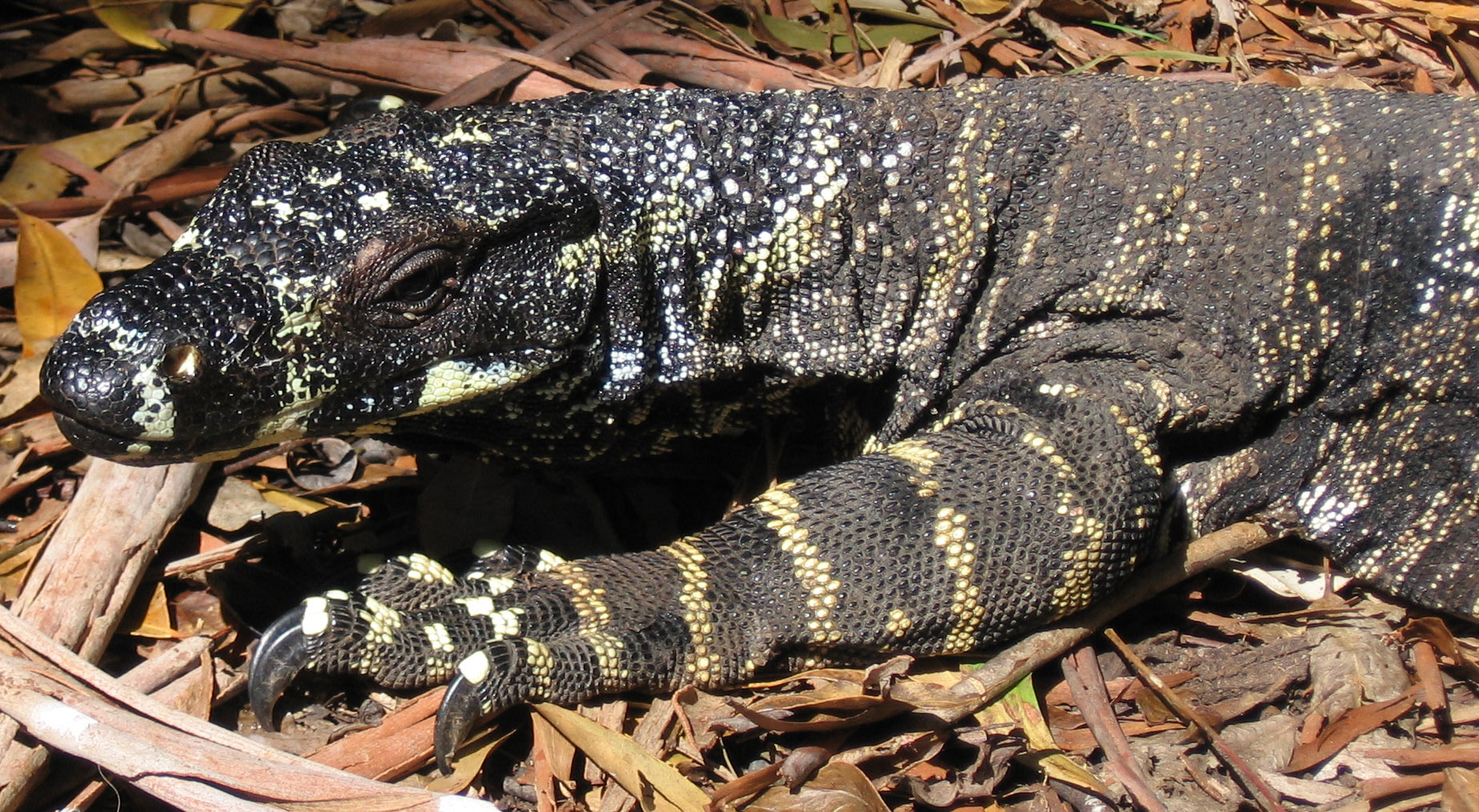
- Lace monitor (Varanus varius)

Scientific classification
- Kingdom: Animalia
- Phylum: Chordata
- Class: Reptilia
- Order: Squamata
- Infraorder: Paleoanguimorpha
- Clade: Goannasauria
- Superfamily: Varanoidea; Münster, 1834

Families
- †Arcanosaurus?; †Dryadissector; †Kaganaias?; †Judeasaurus; †Cherminotus; †Pachyvaranidae; †Palaeovaranidae; Lanthanotidae; Varanidae

= Varanoidea =

Varanoidea Temporal range: Late Cretaceous - Holocene, 94–0 Ma Possible Valanginian record

Superfamily of reptiles

Varanoidea is a superfamily of lizards, including the well-known family Varanidae (the monitors and goannas). Also included in the Varanoidea are the Lanthanotidae (earless monitor lizards), and the extinct Palaeovaranidae.

Throughout their long evolutionary history, varanoids have exhibited great diversity, both in habitat and form. This superfamily includes the largest-known terrestrial lizard, Megalania (~5 meters), and the largest extant lizard, the Komodo dragon (Varanus komodoensis, ~3 meters).

== Evolution ==
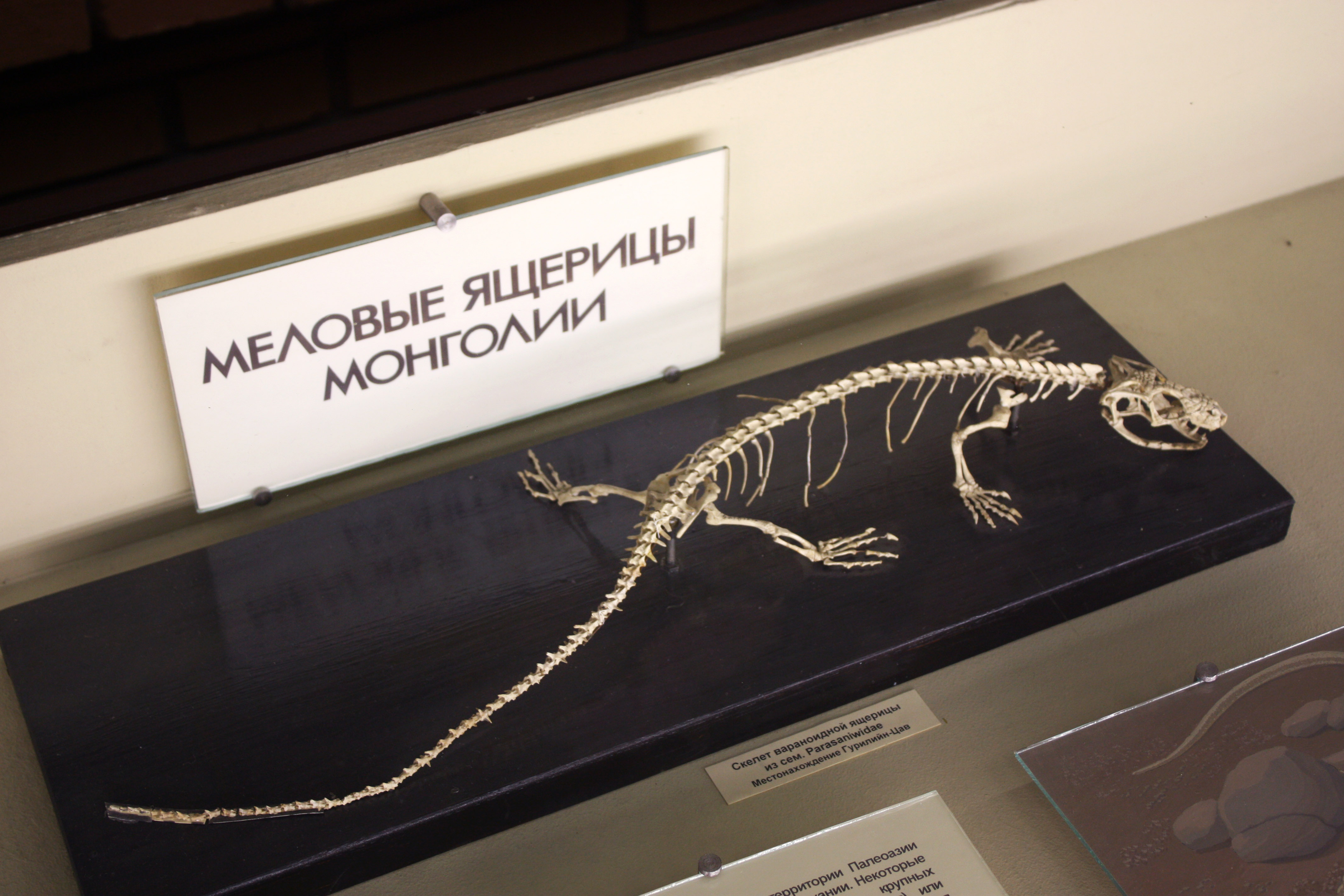
Fossil of a parasaniwid

Either synonymous with, or a subgroup of, the group Platynota, the varanoids first appear in the fossil record in the latter part of Early Cretaceous, but possible varanoid ancestors have been traced back as far as Early Jurassic times. Among the earliest known varanoids are the monitor-like necrosaurids Palaeosaniwa canadensis from the Campanian (roughly 71–82 mya) of North America and Estesia mongoliensis and Telmasaurus grangeri, both from the Campanian of Mongolia. Varanoids survived the Cretaceous–Paleogene extinction event and flourished worldwide during the Cenozoic Era. Carroll argued that the affinities of ancestral snakes suggested evolution from early aquatic or burrowing varanoid lineages, although recent evidence suggests a more distant common ancestor within Toxicofera.

Carroll characterises the varanoids as "the most advanced of all lizards in achieving large size and an active, predaceous way of life". Some taxa, such as the extinct necrosaurids and the possibly varanoid Gila monsters, were armoured with osteoderms (bony deposits on the skin), and many forms have hinged jaws, allowing them to open their mouths very wide when feeding (though they cannot dislocate their jaws, contrary to popular belief).

== Taxonomy ==
According to Estes et al., 1988, which uses morphological characteristics, Varanoidea includes Helodermatidae, Lanthanotus, and Varanus. Gauthier et al., 2012 also groups these three groups together, where Helodermatidae evolved earlier than Varanidae (which includes Lanthanotus and Varanus).
