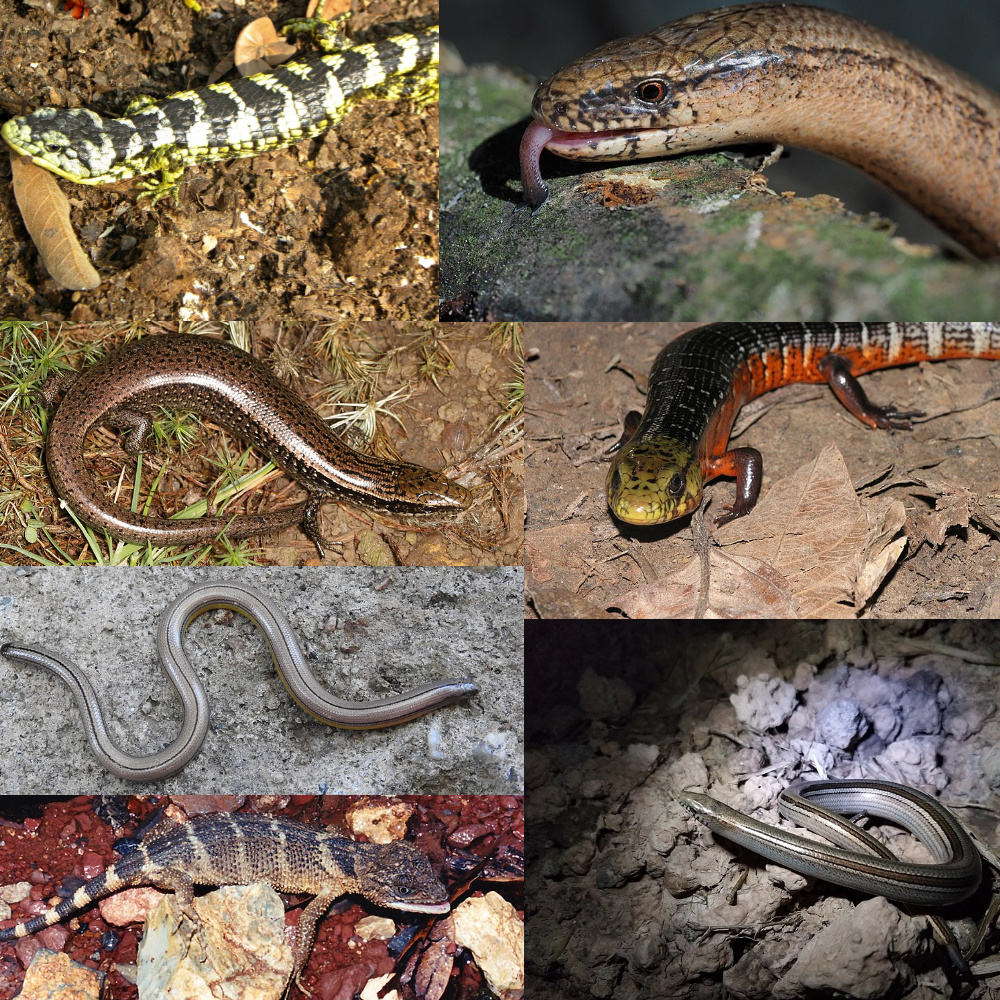

Scientific classification
- Kingdom: Animalia
- Phylum: Chordata
- Class: Reptilia
- Order: Squamata
- Suborder: Anguimorpha
- Infraorder: Neoanguimorpha
- Clade: Diploglossa; Cope, 1864

Subclades
- Carusioidea Cope, 1866; Xenosauridae; Anguioidea Gray, 1825; Diploglossidae; †Dorsetisauridae; Anniellidae; Anguidae

= Diploglossa =

Diploglossa Temporal range: Albian – Present, 110–0 Ma

Clade of lizards

Diploglossa is a clade of neoanguimorphs represented by the families Xenosauridae, Diploglossidae, Anniellidae and Anguidae, the latter three placed in the superfamily Anguioidea. In the past the Chinese crocodile lizard was classified as a xenosaurid; current molecular work has shown evidence the species related to varanoids in the clade Paleoanguimorpha.

Below is the phylogeny of the neoanguimorph lineages after Pyron et al. (2013):

- Diploglossa
  - Xenosauridae (knob-scaled lizards)
  - Anguioidea
    - Diploglossidae (galliwasps)
    - - Anniellidae (American legless lizards)
      - Anguidae (glass lizards and alligator lizards)
