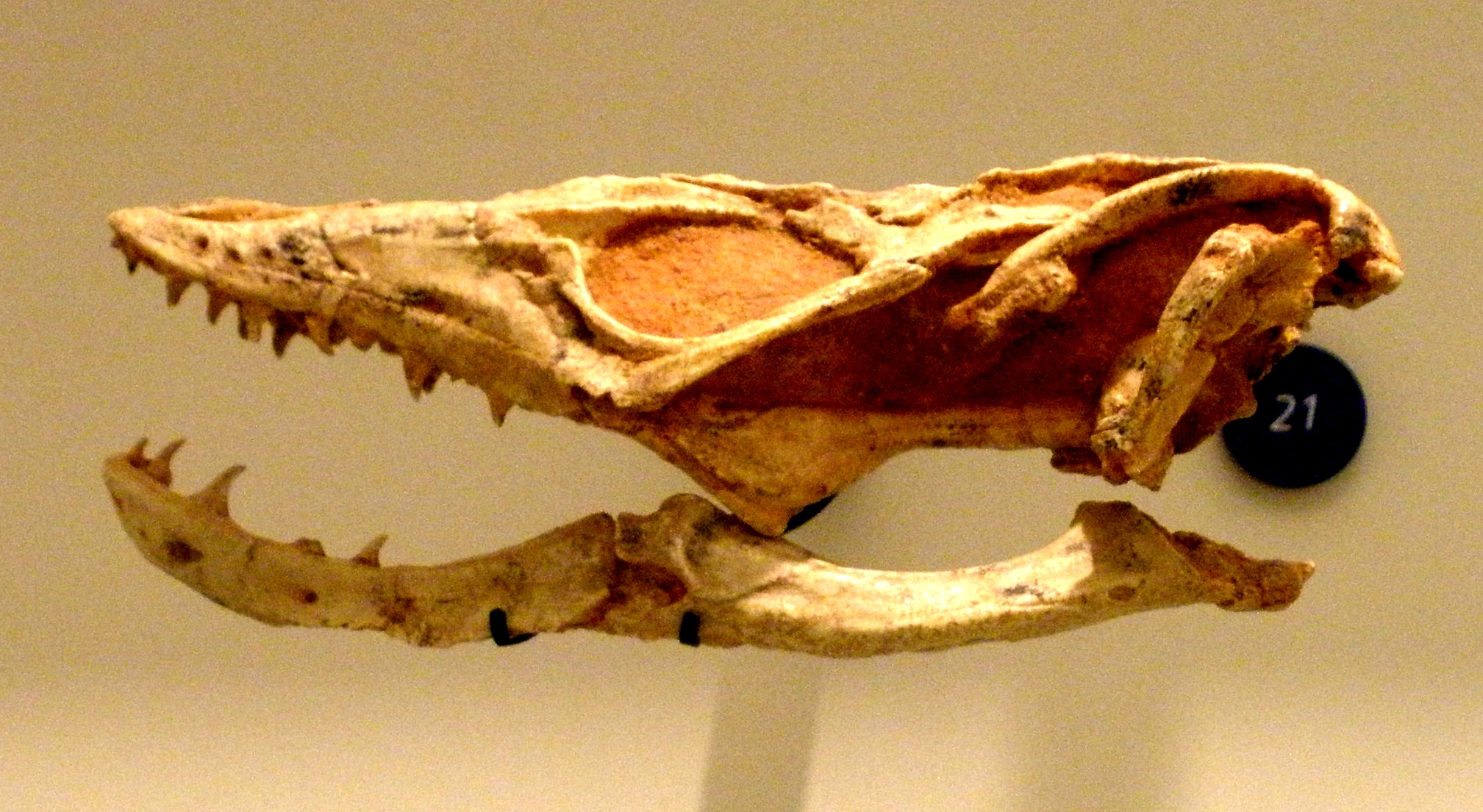
- Cast of skull from the American Museum of Natural History

Scientific classification
- Domain: Eukaryota
- Kingdom: Animalia
- Phylum: Chordata
- Class: Reptilia
- Order: Squamata
- Clade: Goannasauria (?)
- Genus: †Estesia
- Species: †E. mongoliensis

Binomial name
- †Estesia mongoliensis Norell, McKenna & Novacek, 1992

= Estesia =

Estesia Temporal range: Late Cretaceous, 75–71 Ma

Extinct genus of lizards

Estesia (in honour of Richard Estes) is an extinct genus of Late Cretaceous anguimorph lizard found in the Gobi Desert in Mongolia.

== Discovery ==
It was discovered in June 1990 by a joint expedition made up of Mongolian and American palaeontologists, and described in 1992 by Mark Norell, Malcolm McKenna and Michael Novacek. This animal is of interest to palaeontologists, not only because it is close to the lineage of modern Gila monsters (Heloderma), but also because its dentition shows evidence that it was venomous.

The type species is E. mongoliensis, after Mongolia, where it was found.

Material for Estesia has been collected in various localities in the Gobi Desert, including the Barun Goyot Formation, the Djadochta Formation and Ukhaa Tolgod.

- IGM M3/14 (holotype): A well-preserved skull with mandible, from Lizard Hill, Khulsan (Barun Goyot Formation)
- IGM 3/15: Partial skeleton with associated braincase, from Khermeen Tsav (Barun Goyot Formation), discovered in 1993 and described by Norell and Gao in 1997.

== Classification ==
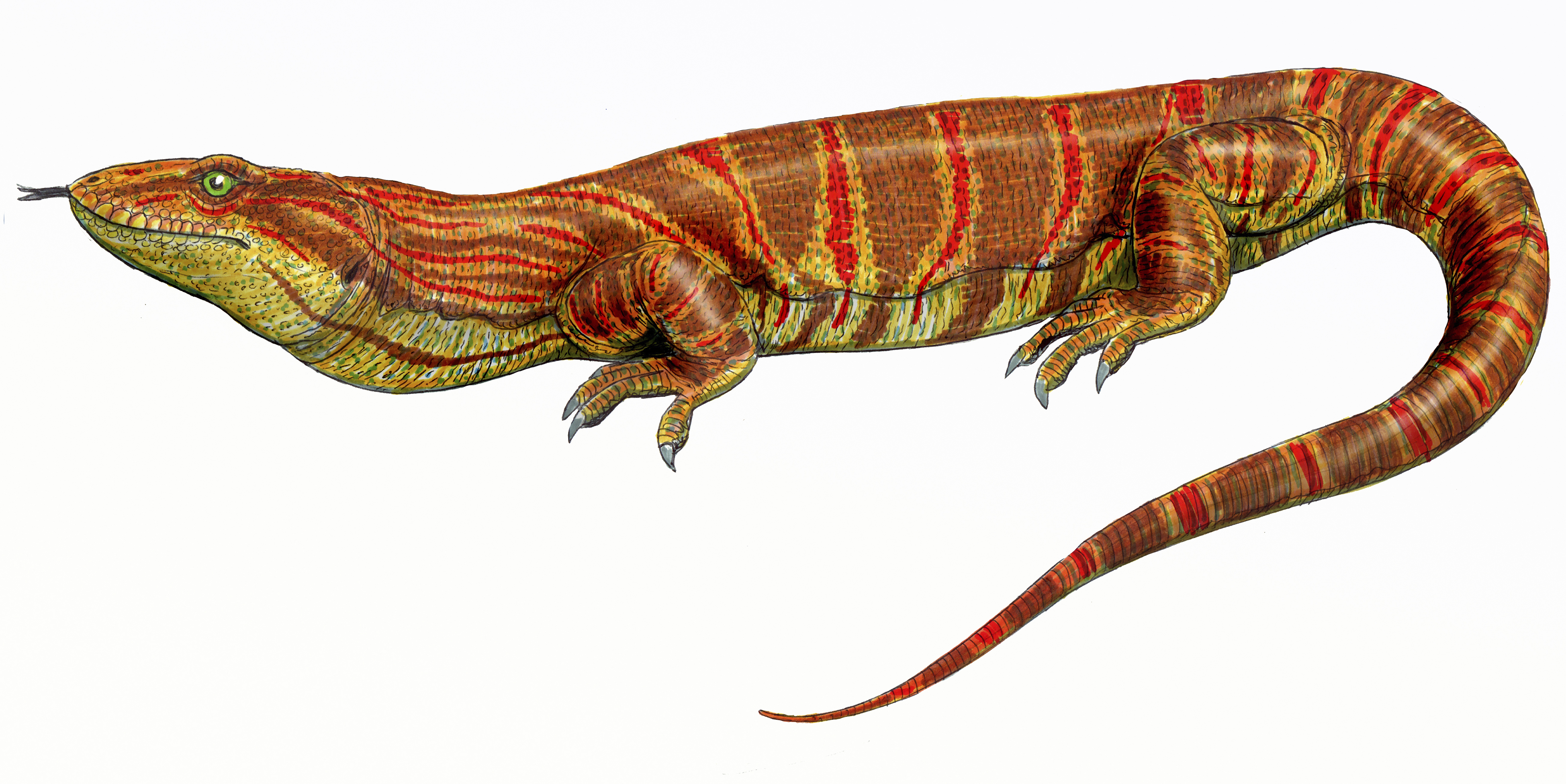
Life restoration

In the description, Estesia was assigned to Varanoidea, as the sister group to Varanidae, based on skull characters. However, the new material found in 1993 provided evidence that Estesia was not closely related to modern varanids, but rather a distant relative of Gila monsters. The phylogenetic analysis presented by Norell and Gao (1997) actually supported the creation of a new group that included modern Gila monsters and extinct pre-historic forms, the Monstersauria.

== Palaeobiology ==
The teeth of Estesia were sharp and recurved, like in modern varanoids. These teeth possess longitudinal grooves that run both from the anterior and posterior tooth surfaces during the entire tooth length. Similar characteristics are present in the teeth of Gila monsters.
