= Chianghsia =

Chianghsia Temporal range: Late Cretaceous, 66.7 Ma

Scientific classification
- Domain: Eukaryota
- Kingdom: Animalia
- Phylum: Chordata
- Class: Reptilia
- Order: Squamata
- Clade: Monstersauria
- Genus: †Chianghsia; Mo, Xu & Evans, 2012

Type species
- †Chianghsia nankangensis Mo, Xu & Evans, 2012

Extinct genus of lizards

Chianghsia is an extinct genus of monstersaurian platynotan lizard known from the Late Cretaceous deposits of the Nanxiong Formation, southern China. It contains a single species, Chianghsia nankangensis. Its genus is named after Jiangxi and its specific name is after Nankang District, Ganzhou. It was a large lizard, with the skull length estimated up to 17.5–18 cm (6.9–7.1 in) in total and the snout-vent length around 1–1.25 m (3 ft 3 in – 4 ft 1 in).
