= Paraderma =

Paraderma Temporal range: Late Cretaceous

Scientific classification
- Kingdom: Animalia
- Phylum: Chordata
- Class: Reptilia
- Order: Squamata
- Suborder: Anguimorpha
- Family: Helodermatidae
- Genus: †Paraderma

Type species
- Paraderma bogerti Estes, 1964

Extinct genus of lizard

Paraderma is an extinct genus of lizard. it is primarily known from the late Cretaceous Lance Formation.

Paraderma is taxonomically disputed. When it was discovered in 1964, it was assigned to Parasaniwidae, but was reassigned to Helodermatidae in 1983. The most recent study has placed it solidly into Monstersauria.
