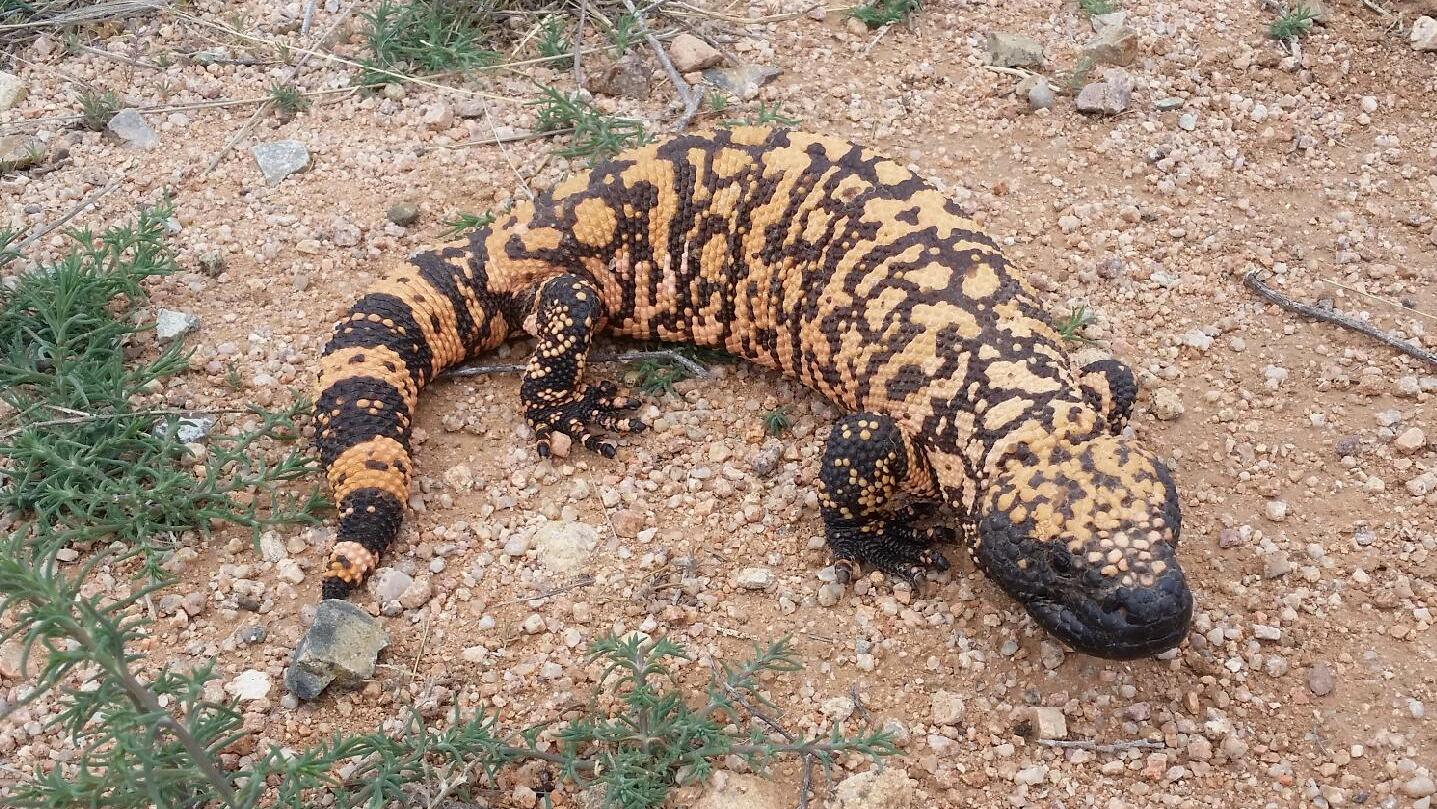
- Gila monster (Heloderma suspectum)
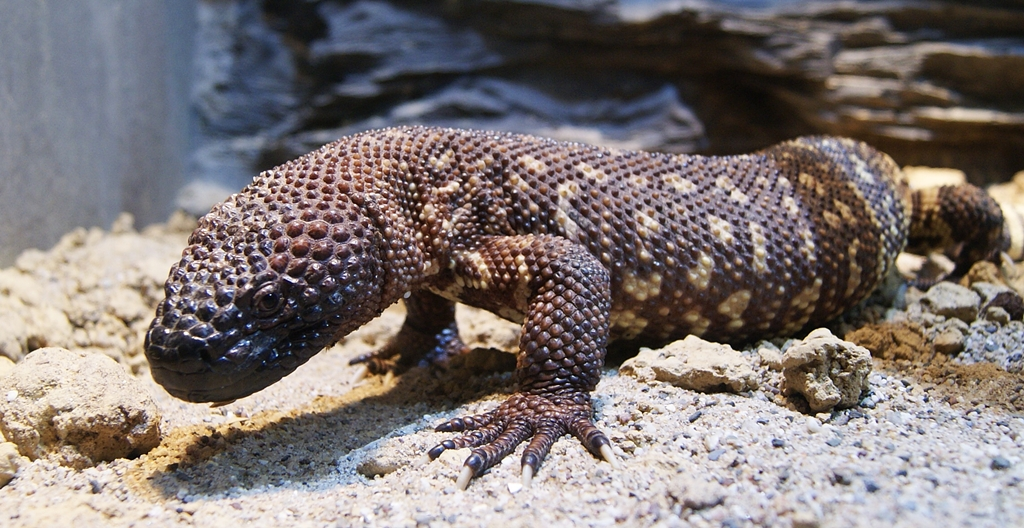
- Mexican beaded lizard (Heloderma horridum)

Scientific classification
- Kingdom: Animalia
- Phylum: Chordata
- Class: Reptilia
- Order: Squamata
- Suborder: Anguimorpha
- Clade: Monstersauria
- Family: Helodermatidae; Gray, 1837

Genera
- Heloderma; †Eurheloderma; †Lowesaurus

= Helodermatidae =

Helodermatidae Temporal range: Eocene - Holocene, 37–0 Ma

Family of lizards

The Helodermatidae or beaded lizards are a small family of lizards endemic to North America today, mainly found in the Isthmus of Tehuantepec in Oaxaca, the central lowlands of Chiapas, on the border of Guatemala, and in the Nentón River Valley, though they were formerly more widespread in the ancient past. Traditionally, the Gila monster and the Mexican beaded lizard were the only species recognized, although the latter has recently been split into several species.

While the fossil record of this family may date back to as far as the Cretaceous with genera such as Primaderma and Paraderma of North America, the oldest definitive members of the Helodermatidae date to the Early Oligocene, with Lowesaurus matthewi from North America (Nebraska) and Eurheloderma gallicum from Europe (France).
