= Gobiderma =

Gobiderma Temporal range: Late Cretaceous

Scientific classification
- Domain: Eukaryota
- Kingdom: Animalia
- Phylum: Chordata
- Class: Reptilia
- Order: Squamata
- Clade: Goannasauria (?)
- Genus: †Gobiderma; Borsuk-Białynicka, 1984

Type species
- Gobiderma pulchrum Borsuk-Białynicka, 1984

Extinct genus of lizards

Gobiderma is an extinct genus of Late Cretaceous lizard whose fossils are known from the Gobi Desert in southern Mongolia. It was first discovered as a result of a joint Polish-Mongolian Paleontological Expedition, and formally named in 1984. In life, it probably resembled lizards of the genus Heloderma to a large degree, though its skull was more elongated than lizards of that genus.

== Sources ==
- Dragons in the Dust: The Paleobiology of the Giant Monitor Lizard Megalania by Ralph E. Molnar (page 91) ISBN 978-0253343741
- In the Shadow of the Dinosaurs: Early Mesozoic Tetrapods by Nicholas C. Fraser and Hans-Dieter Sues (page 30) ISBN 978-0521458993
- The Age of Dinosaurs in Russia and Mongolia by Michael J. Benton, Mikhail A. Shishkin, David M. Unwin, and Evgenii N. Kurochkin (page 381) ISBN 978-0521545822
- Cretaceous Environments of Asia (Developments in Palaeontology and Stratigraphy) by N.-J. Mateer (page 59) ISBN 978-0444502766
