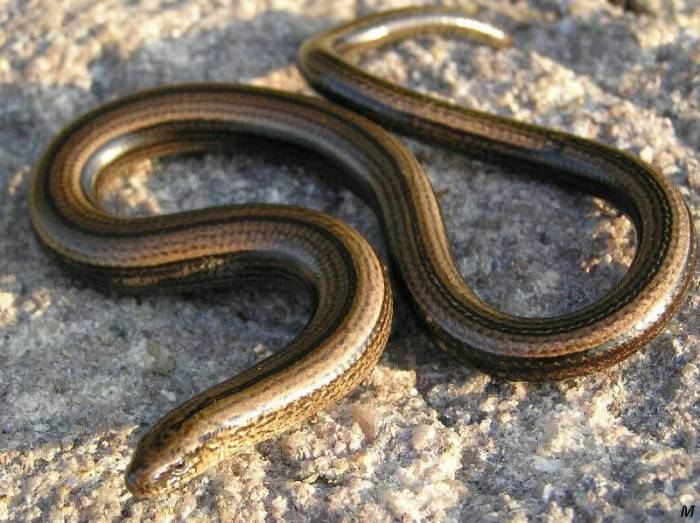

Scientific classification
- Kingdom: Animalia
- Phylum: Chordata
- Class: Reptilia
- Order: Squamata
- Clade: Toxicofera
- Suborder: Anguimorpha; Fürbringer, 1900

Subclades
- †Dorsetisaurus; †Parophisaurus; †Yabeinosaurus; †Barlochersaurus?; Neoanguimorpha; Paleoanguimorpha; †Cryptovaranoides?; †Mosasauria?

= Anguimorpha =

Anguimorphs Temporal range: Late Jurassic–Recent

Suborder of lizards

The Anguimorpha is a suborder of squamates. The group was named by Fürbringer in 1900 to include all autarchoglossans closer to Varanus and Anguis than Scincus. These lizards, along with iguanians and snakes, constitute the proposed "venom clade" Toxicofera of all venomous reptiles.

== Evolution ==
The oldest widely accepted member of Anguimorpha is Dorsetisaurus from the Late Jurassic of Europe and North America. In 2022, the genus Cryptovaranoides was described from the latest Triassic (Rhaetian) of England. Cryptovaranoides was recovered in the study as a crown-group anguimorph, and therefore the oldest crown group-squamate, 35 million years older than any previously known crown-group squamate. However, a 2023 study found that Cryptovaranoides most likely represents an archosauromorph that was only distantly related to squamates.

== Families ==
=== Anguidae ===
There are 9 genera found within the Anguidae family. They are characterized by being heavily armored with non-overlapping scales, and almost all having well-developed ventrolateral folds (excluding Anguis). Anguidae members can, however, be somewhat difficult to identify in their family, as members can be limbed or limbless, and can be both viviparous and oviparous. Anguidae members have pterygoid teeth. Many members of this family have tail autotomy.

=== Anniellidae ===
There is only one genus within the Anniellidae family, comprising 6 species of American legless lizards. They are characterized as having no limbs, and can be found in California and Baja California. They have wedge-shaped heads and a countersunk jaw that allows them to bury themselves in sand or loose soil, which they can drink water from if the soil has a water quantity greater than 7%. They give live birth and usually have two offspring.

=== Diploglossidae ===
There are twelve genera in the Diploglossidae family. They are characterized by having very long, automatized tails, small and well-developed limbs, and no ventrolateral fold. They do have bicuspid posterior teeth. They give both live birth, and lay clutches, according to the genus.

=== Xenosauridae ===
There is only one genus, with 14 species, found in the Xenosauridae family. This family is both dorsally and ventrally covered in knob-like scales. Their tail is about 1.2 times the length of their body. They give live birth, with a litter usually consisting of two offspring, although they can have up to eight. Gestation takes eleven to twelve months. They are primarily insectivores.

=== Helodermatidae ===
The family Helodermatidae (beaded lizards) has only one genus with 5 species: the Gila monster (Heloderma suspectum), Rio Fuerte beaded lizard (Heloderma exasperatum), Mexican beaded lizard (Heloderma horridum), Chiapan beaded lizard (Heloderma alvarezi) and Guatemalan beaded lizard (Heloderma charlesbogerti). This family is the only known family of lizards that have well-developed venom glands. In addition, they have non-automated tails (short in Gila monsters, while considerably larger the rest of the genus) in which they store fat. They have somewhat tubercular scales both dorsally and laterally, with their ventral scales being smooth, and being larger than the dorsal and lateral scales while much of their body is covered by osteoderms. They are oviparous, with clutch sizes averaging about 6 eggs per clutch. These lizards have a pectoral girdle, meaning that they must push their swallowed prey past it in order to eat. Despite this limitation, these lizards have been observed eating prey up to 33% of their body weight.

=== Shinisauridae ===
The family Shinisauridae contains one living species, the Chinese crocodile lizard (Shinisaurus crocodilurus). This species is semiaquatic, found in forests along streams. These lizards can hold their breath underwater for up to thirty minutes at a time. Found in southern China, this species is viviparous, with litters ranging from 2-7 individuals. This species has well-developed limbs and has a tail that is around 1.2 times the length of its body. Tail autotomy is not present in these lizards.

=== Lanthanotidae ===
The family Lanthanotidae consists of a single species, the earless monitor lizard (Lanthanotus borneensis). This species has thick skin, which is covered by small, rounded scales that appear in rows. The main defining feature that distinguishes this species from other monitors is its lack of a parietal eye and the lack of a hemibaculum. The species is presumed to be semiaquatic, but little is known about its wild habits, as most information and study comes from captive individuals. It is only found on a single island of off the coast of Singapore.

=== Varanidae ===
The Varanidae are a family of carnivorous and frugivorous monitor lizards, which contains one extant genus (Varanus) with 80 species, including the Komodo dragon. They can be characterized by their thick skin and small, rounded scales. The ventral scales are slightly larger than the dorsal scales. They have a parietal eye and a hemibaculum. This completely oviparous family has a clutch size that correlates with the body size. No members of this family exhibit parental care. They also have limbs that are relatively small for their body size. The family is also broken up into 9 distinct morphological subgroups. Some species of Varanidae, such as Varanus komodoensis, or the Komodo dragon, have been found to produce venom. Previous research has suggested that pathogenic bacteria may play an integral role in the predatory ecology of the Komodo dragon, however, the inter-individual variability of oral flora in Komodo dragons makes this unlikely. Using Magnetic Resonance Imaging (MRI), a study in 2008 concluded that V. komodoensis have well-developed mandibular venom glands and that they use this venom to compensate for a weak bite force. Their bite force, however, can be up to 500 psi. This is surprising due to their light skull weight and Komodo dragons relying more on their conical, backwards-facing teeth to hold on to prey.

== Classification ==
The following cladogram is based on the optimal results found by Reeder et al. (2015) in the largest-scale morphological+molecular phylogenetic analysis of extant and fossil squamates as of that year:

- Anguimorpha
  - Paleoanguimorpha
    - Shinisauridae
    - - †Gobiderma
      - - †Aiolosaurus
        - †Estesia
      - Varanidae sensu Lee 1997
        - Lanthanotus
        - Varanidae sensu Estes 1998
          - †Saniwa
          - Varanus
  - Neoanguimorpha
    - Monstersauria
      Heloderma
    - Diploglossa
      - Xenosauridae
      - Anguioidea
        - †Glyptosauridae
        - Diploglossidae
        - - Anniellidae
          - Anguidae

Many phylogenetic studies have also recovered the extinct mosasaurs within Anguimorpha.
