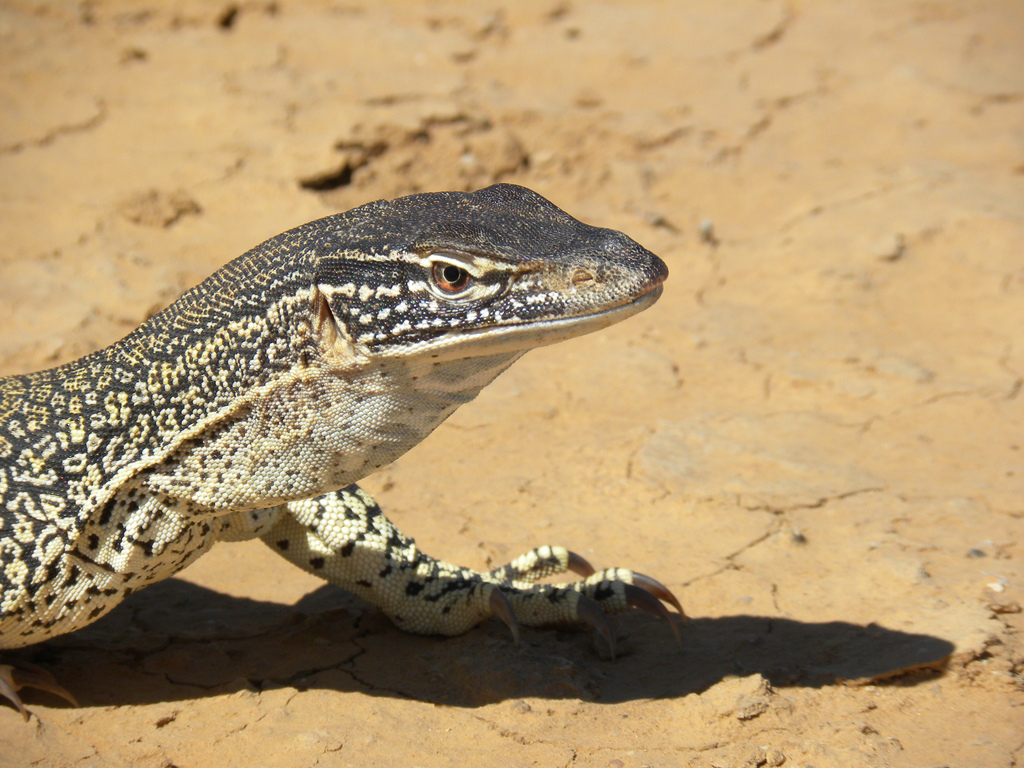
- Sand goanna (Varanus gouldii)

Scientific classification
- Kingdom: Animalia
- Phylum: Chordata
- Class: Reptilia
- Order: Squamata
- Suborder: Anguimorpha
- (unranked): Platynota; Duméril and Bibron, 1839

Subgroups
- †Proplatynotia; Lanthanotidae; Varanoidea

= Platynota =

Platynota Temporal range: Late Cretaceous - Holocene, 94–0 Ma Possible Valanginian record

Clade of lizards

Platynota is a polyphyletic group of anguimorph lizards and thus belongs to the order Squamata of the class Reptilia. Since it was named in 1839, it has included several groups, including monitor lizards, snakes, mosasaurs, and helodermatids. Its taxonomic use still varies, as it is sometimes considered equivalent to the group Varanoidea and other times viewed as a distinct group. It is phylogenetically defined as a clade containing Varanidae (the monitor lizards). It also includes many extinct species.

== Description ==
Many skeletal features support the grouping of monitor lizards, helodermatids, and several extinct species in Platynota. All platynotans have a hinged upper jaw with widely spaced teeth, each having a large base, that erupt from behind existing teeth. The teeth are plicidentine, meaning that they have highly folded layers of dentine in their centers. Many have fused frontal and nasal bones on the top of their skulls (in other lizards, these bones are separated into pairs). Some platynotan features that are not seen in the skeleton, and therefore only known from living species, include a deeply forked tongue and a venom gland called the gland of Gabe.

== History and classification ==
Platynota was first used as a superfamily of anguimorph lizards. In 1923, Charles Lewis Camp included the groups Varanoidea and Mosasauroidea, or monitor lizards and mosasaurs (a group of large marine reptiles from the Cretaceous). A close relationship between mosasaurs and snakes, which together formed the group Pythonomorpha, gained favor in the following years. Consequently, some researchers also included snakes within Platynota.

A more restricted definition was proposed by the herpetologists Samuel Booker McDowell and Charles Mitchill Bogert in 1954. Within Platynota, they included only monitor lizards, helodermatids, and their closest extinct relatives. Their use of Platynota made it essentially equivalent to Varanoidea, a taxon that included monitor lizards and helodermatids and had been in use for many years. McDowell and Bogert's usage of Platynota gained favor in the following decades, although it was substituted by the name Varanoidea in some studies.

Platynota was given a phylogenetic definition in 1997. It was erected as a stem-based clade that included Heloderma (the Gila monster and Beaded lizard), Lanthanotus (the Earless monitor lizard), and Varanus (monitor lizards), and all lizards that are more closely related to them than to other anguimorphs. These other anguimorphs were traditionally called Diploglossa, and include Anguidae, Anniellidae (American legless lizards), and Xenosauridae (knob-scaled lizards). A node-based definition was first given in 1998 in which Platynota included the last common ancestor of Monstersauria (helodermatids) and Varanidae (monitor lizards) and all of its descendants. Under this definition, Platynota includes the same forms as Varanoidea in its traditional sense. Varanoidea, however, has been redefined as a node-based clade including the extinct Telmasaurus and varanids.

Molecular evidence from DNA and other molecules conflicts with the commonly held classification of platynotans. A 2004 molecular study of living anguimorph lizards found a close relationship between helodermatids and xenosaurids, but not between helodermatids and varanids. Similarly, a 2005 study found a close relationship between Anniella pulchra (the California legless lizard) and helodermatids. A cladistic study synthesizing molecular and morphological data for squamates reinforced the placement of Helodermatidae as closer to Xenosauridae.

== Evolution ==
The oldest platynotans are from the Late Cretaceous of Mongolia, living around 80 million years ago. They include forms that are similar in appearance to living monitor lizards, such as Paravaranus, Proplatynotia, Gobiderma, Cherminotus, Telmasaurus, and Saniwides. Although they lived in close association with each other, they represent a diversity of different anguimorphs. The earliest and most generalized platynotans were once called necrosaurians after the genus Palaeovaranus.
