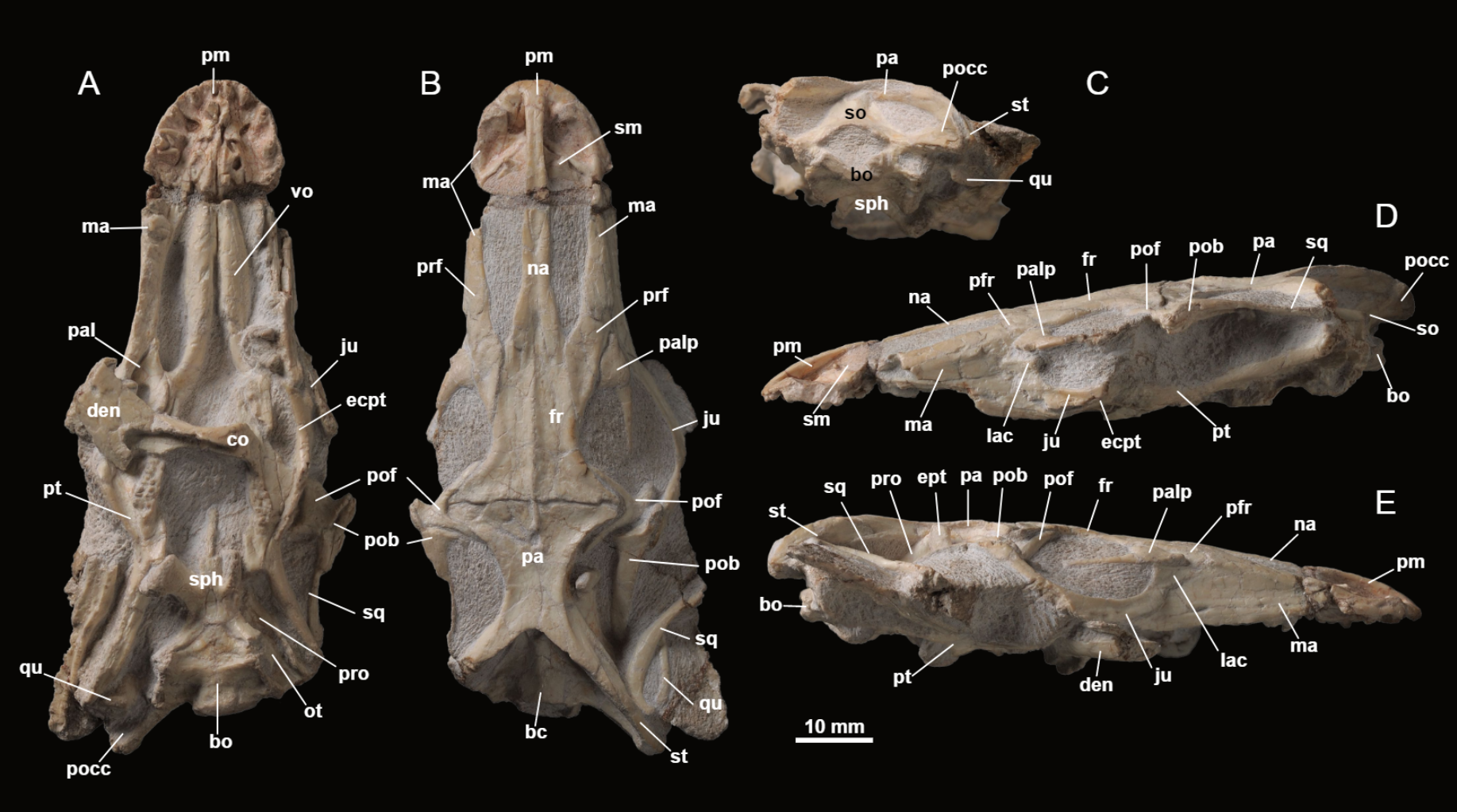
- Holotype skull in various views

Scientific classification
- Kingdom: Animalia
- Phylum: Chordata
- Class: Reptilia
- Order: Squamata
- Suborder: Anguimorpha
- Family: Varanidae
- Genus: †Archaeovaranus; Dong et al., 2022
- Species: †A. lii

Binomial name
- †Archaeovaranus lii Dong et al., 2022

= Archaeovaranus =

Archaeovaranus Temporal range: Early Eocene, Ypresian, 53 Ma

Genus of extinct lizards

Archaeovaranus (meaning "ancient Varanus") is genus of varanid lizard from the early Eocene (Ypresian) Yuhuangding Formation of Hubei Province, China. The genus contains a single species, Archaeovaranus lii, known from a nearly complete skeleton. The holotype, which includes an intact skull, is associated but disarticulated. Archaeovaranus fills a gap in the varanid fossil record, as it represents a stem-varanid from the early Eocene of East Asia, and is the closest known relative of Varanus.

== Discovery and naming ==
The holotype specimen of Archaeovaranus, IVPP V 22770, was discovered at the Dajian locality of the Yuhuangding Formation near Danjiangkou, Hubei Province, China.

The generic name, "Archaeovaranus," combines the Greek "archaīos," meaning "ancient," with a reference to the closely related Varanus. "Varanus" is derived from the Arabic "waral," meaning "lizard beast." The specific name, "lii," honors the paleontologist Chuankui Li, whose research included studies of the Archaeovaranus type locality.

== Description ==
The holotype specimen represents an adult individual, around 16 years old at the time of death. However, a lack of fusion at the distal ends of the humerus and femur suggest that the individual was still growing. The body size is approximately equivalent to Varanus salvator.

== Taxonomy ==
Archaeovaranus was found in the study to be the closest known relative of modern monitor lizards belonging to the genus Varanus.

Cladogram after Dong et al. 2022.

- Varanidae
  - †Ovoo gurvel
  - - - †Telmasaurus grangeri
      - - †Aiolosaurus oriens
        - †Saniwides mongoliensis
    - - - †Paravaranus angustifrons
        - †Proplatynotia longirostrata
      - - †Saniwa ensidens
        - - †Archaeovaranus lii
          - Varanus

== Paleoecology ==
The mammals Rhombomylus, Advenimus, Asiocoryphodon and Danjiangia are also known from layers of the Yuhuangding Formation.
