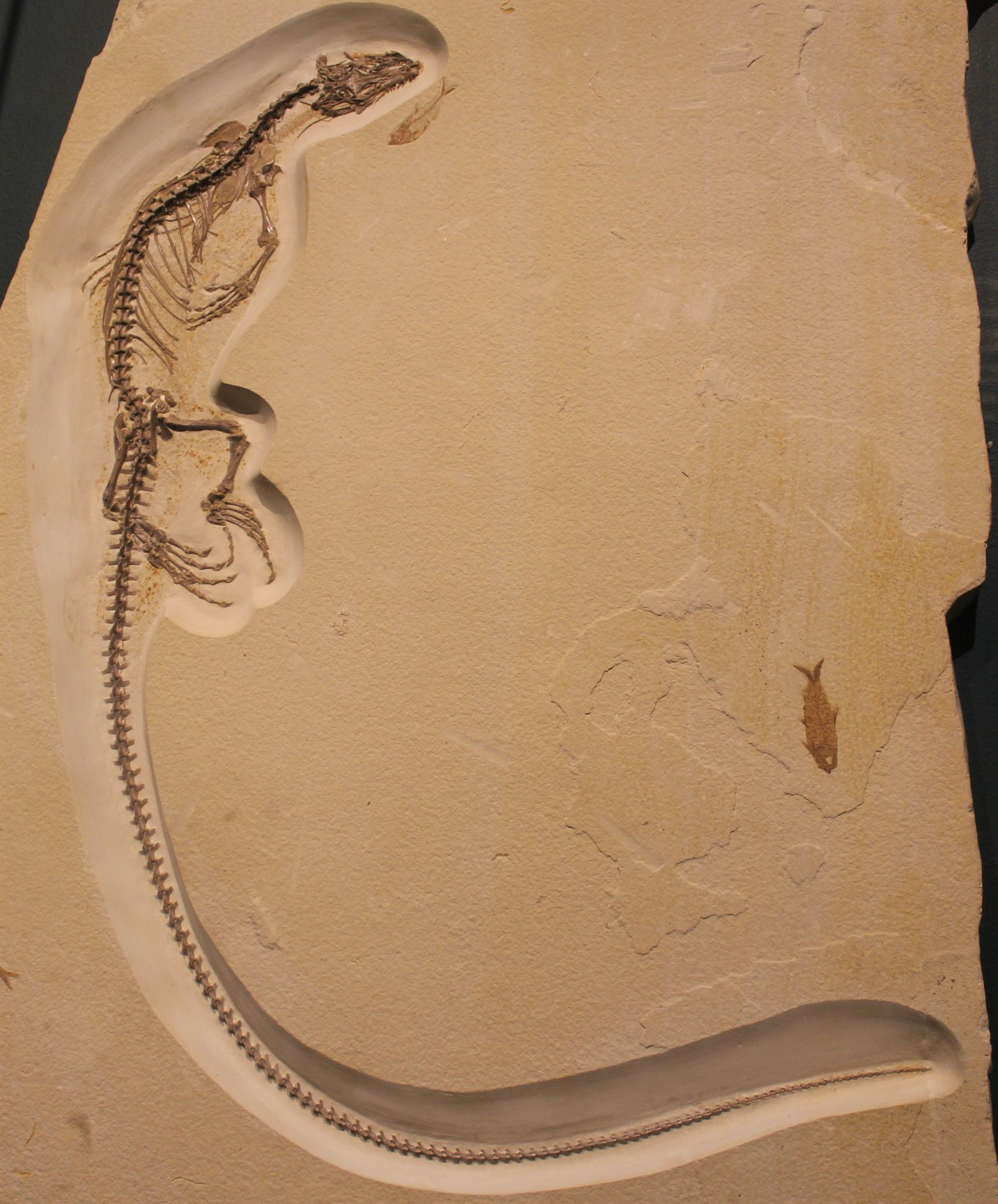
- Skeleton of Saniwa ensidens in the Field Museum of Natural History

Scientific classification
- Kingdom: Animalia
- Phylum: Chordata
- Class: Reptilia
- Order: Squamata
- Suborder: Anguimorpha
- Family: Varanidae
- Genus: †Saniwa; Leidy, 1870

Species
- †S. ensidens Leidy, 1870 (type); †S. orsmaelensis Dollo, 1923

Synonyms
- Thinosaurus Marsh, 1872

= Saniwa =

Saniwa Temporal range: Eocene

Extinct genus of lizards

Saniwa is an extinct genus of varanid lizard that lived during the Eocene epoch. It is known from well-preserved fossils found in the Bridger and Green River Formations of Wyoming, United States. The type species S. ensidens was described in 1870 as the first fossil lizard known from North America. A second species, S. orsmaelensis, is recognised from remains found in Europe. It is a close relative of Varanus, the genus that includes monitor lizards.

== Description ==
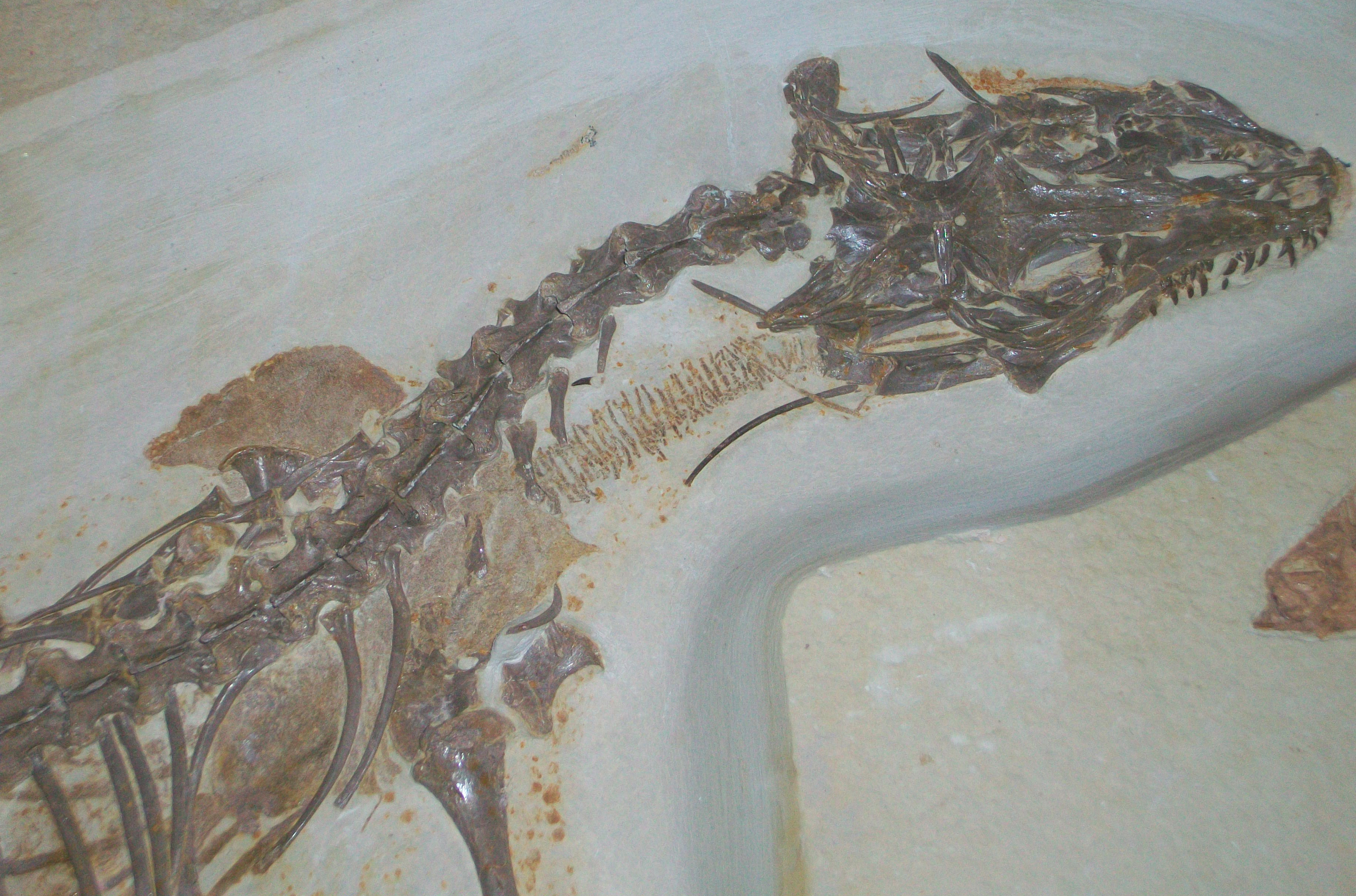
The skull of S. ensidens

Saniwa measured 1.3 to 2.1 m (4.3 to 6.9 ft). Like other varanid lizards, Saniwa had a long, pointed snout and nostrils placed farther back in the skull than most lizards and a tail that was almost twice as long as the body. Although similar in appearance to extant monitor lizards, Saniwa had many primitive traits, including teeth on its palate, a jugal bone beneath the eye that extended farther forward, and a suture between the frontal and parietal bones that was straight rather than curved.

A study in 2018 by scientists from the Senckenberg Research Institute and Yale University found Saniwa had two parietal eyes, one that developed from the pineal gland and the other from the parapineal gland. The parietal eye is a light-sensitive structure present in the tuatara, most lizards, frogs, salamanders, certain bony fish, sharks and lampreys, a group of jawless fish. It plays an important role in geographical orientation and regulating circadian and annual rhythms. Saniwa is the only known jawed vertebrate to have both a pineal and a parapineal eye, as the only other vertebrates that have both are the jawless lampreys. In most vertebrates, the pineal gland forms the parietal eye, however, in lepidosaurs, it is formed from the parapineal gland. This implies that Saniwa reevolved the pineal eye.

== History and species ==
In 1870, American geologist Ferdinand Vandeveer Hayden found the first fossils of Saniwa near the town of Granger, Wyoming, and gave them to paleontologist Joseph Leidy. Later that year, Leidy described the type species Saniwa ensidens on the basis of these fossils. Saniwa was the first extinct lizard to be named from North America. The first remains of S. ensidens were preserved as black bones in marl that was part of the Bridger Formation. Hayden suggested the name Saniwa to Leidy because it was "used by one of the Indian tribes of the Upper Missouri for a rock-lizard." Leidy saw a close similarity between Saniwa and the living Nile monitor.

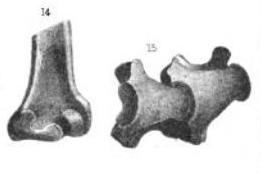
Leidy's illustrations of the humerus of S. major and the vertebrae of S. ensidens

Although his first description was brief, Leidy studied the genus thoroughly and provided illustrations in an 1873 paper. In this paper, Leidy called it Saniwa. He also named a second species, Saniwa [sic] major, on the basis of a broken humerus and some isolated dorsal vertebrae. In 1918, Baron G. J. de Fejérváry suggested that S. major was not a species of lizard, noting that the humerus was "undoubtedly" nonreptilian. Leidy even pointed out similarities between the bone and those of birds in 1873.

Soon after Leidy named Saniwa, American paleontologist Othniel Charles Marsh erected the genus Thinosaurus in 1872 for several species of extinct lizards in the western United States. He never published a full description of these lizards, and Thinosaurus was later considered a junior synonym of Saniwa. The species T. leptodus was synonymized with S. ensidens, but all other species have remained distinct, including T. agilis, T. crassa, T. grandis, and T. paucidens.

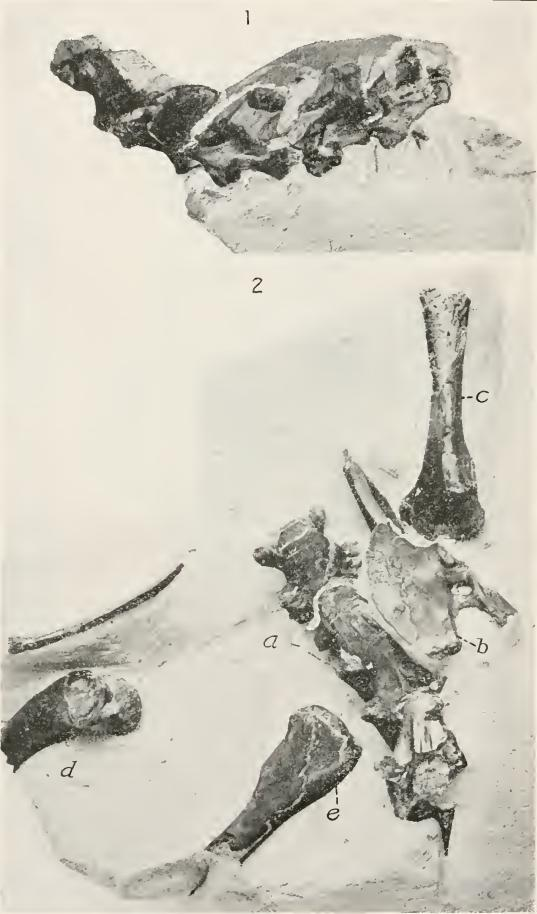
The vertebrae and limb bones of the holotype specimen of S. ensidens

In the 1920s, much of the holotype specimen of S. ensidens was prepared by removing marl from around the bones. This revealed many new features of Saniwa, including the underside of the skull and parts of the vertebrae. American paleontologist Charles W. Gilmore restudied the holotype and described new features in 1922. He described many of these features from a fragment of the snout and lower jaw. Although this fossil was well preserved, it was not found in the same block of marl as other parts of the specimen. This fossil was reexamined in 2003 and was found to belong to a xenosaurid lizard, not Saniwa.

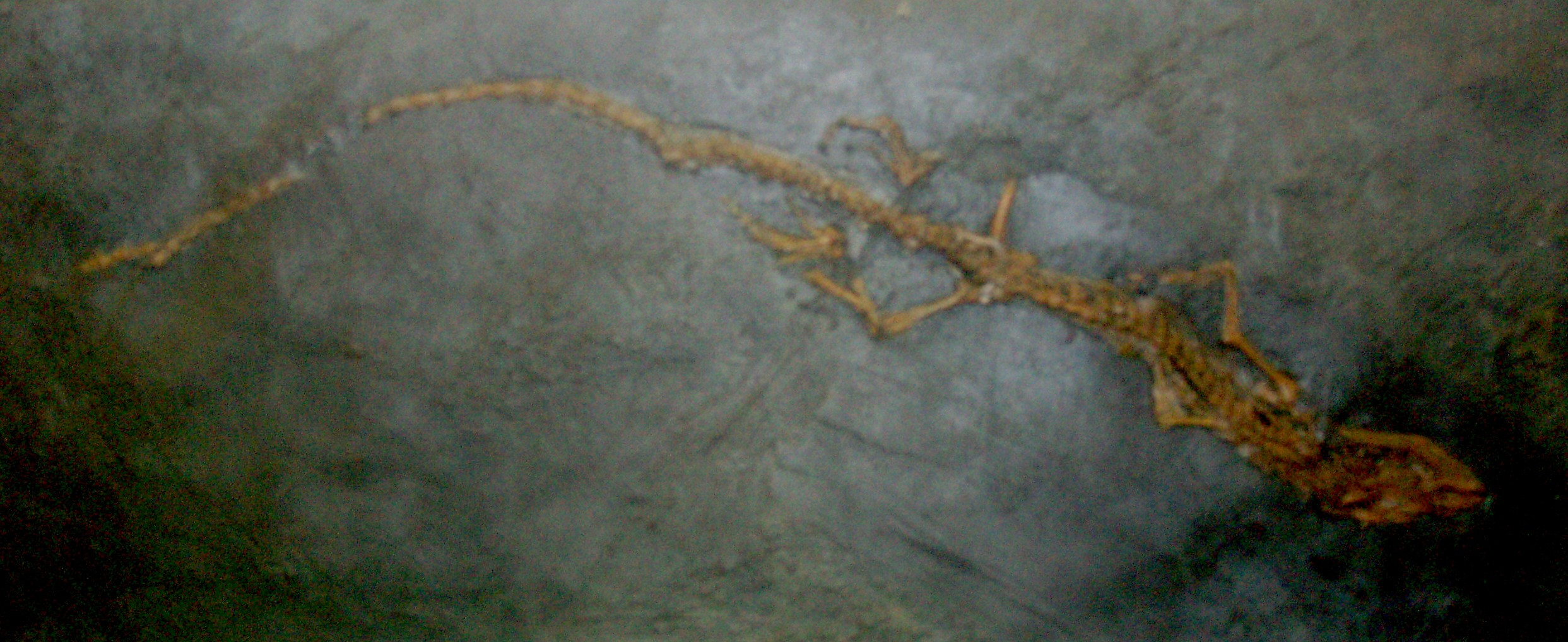
A fossil of Paranecrosaurus, formerly "Saniwa" feisti

Fossils from many other parts of the world have been assigned to Saniwa, although all are fragmentary. In 1899, Argentine paleontologist Florentino Ameghino named another species of Saniwa, S. australis, from lower Miocene rocks in Argentina. It is now considered a dubious name, because the material cannot be assigned with confidence to Saniwa. S. orsmaelensis was described from Belgium in 1923, but because its naming was informal, it was designated a naked name. S. orsmaelensis was later suggested to be either synonymous with S. ensidens or a different, indeterminate species of Saniwa. Unlike the Argentine fossils, the Belgian remains represent a definite occurrence of Saniwa outside North America. A 2022 study found S. orsmaelensis to be a distinct and valid species of Saniwa, with remains of the species also reported from France. "S." feisti was named from the Eocene Messel Pit in Germany in 1983. "S." feisti is no longer considered to be a species of Saniwa, but is placed in the separate genus Paranecrosaurus within the family Palaeovaranidae, which is more distantly related to Varanus than Saniwa.

A complete and articulated skeleton of S. ensidens was described from the Green River Formation of Wyoming in 2007. It preserves soft tissues like scales, cartilage between bones and in the sternum, and even the trachea. The individual is thought to have been a juvenile.

== Classification ==
Since its first description, Saniwa has been recognized as a close relative of living monitor lizards in the genus Varanus. It is a member of the family Varanidae. Saniwa ensidens is often placed as the sister taxon of Varanus in phylogenetic analyses, meaning it is more closely related to Varanus than any other varanid. Below is a cladogram from Conrad et al. (2008) that shows a sister-group relationship between Saniwa ensidens and Varanus:

- Varanoidea
  - †Mosasaurs
  - - †"Saniwa" feisti
    - - †Necrosaurus
      - - - †Saniwides
          - †Telmasaurus
        - Varanidae
          - Lanthanotinae
            - †Aiolosaurus
            - - Lanthanotus
              - †Cherminotus
          - Varaninae
            - †Ovoo
            - - †Saniwa ensidens
              - Varanus

Below is a cladogram from Dong et al. 2022.

- Varanidae
  - †Ovoo gurvel
  - - - †Telmasaurus grangeri
      - - †Aiolosaurus oriens
        - †Saniwides mongoliensis
    - - - †Paravaranus angustifrons
        - †Proplatynotia longirostrata
      - - †Saniwa ensidens
        - - †Archaeovaranus lii
          - Varanus
