= Proplatynotia =

Proplatynotia Temporal range: Late Cretaceous, 75 Ma

Scientific classification
- Domain: Eukaryota
- Kingdom: Animalia
- Phylum: Chordata
- Class: Reptilia
- Order: Squamata
- Superfamily: Varanoidea
- Genus: †Proplatynotia; Borsuk-Bialynicka, 1984

Species
- †P. longirostrata Borsuk-Bialynicka, 1984 (type)

Extinct genus of lizards

Proplatynotia is an extinct genus of varanoid lizard from the Late Cretaceous of Mongolia. Fossils have been found in the Barun Goyot Formation, which is mid-Campanian in age. The type and only species, P. longirostrata, was named in 1984.

== Description ==
Proplatynotia was named in 1984 from a single holotype skull cataloged as ZPAL MgR-I/68. The skull is mostly complete except for damage in the posterior area. Rounded plates of osteoderms cover the top surface and would have been covered in scales in life.

Compared to other Cretaceous varanoids, Proplatynotia was medium-sized with a skull about 4 centimetres (1.6 in) long. Its skull is long and slender, giving the type species P. longirostrata its name, which means "long snout." Bones in the back of the skull called parietals are enlarged, indicating that it may have had larger jaw muscles and a stronger bite than most monitor lizards. Proplatynotia has many primitive varanoid features, including nostrils that are placed near the tip of the snout. The nostrils have expanded and moved backward in later varanoids, separating the maxilla and nasal bone. In Proplatynotia, these bones still touch. Other characteristic features of Proplatynotia include:

- The elongation of a hole beneath the eye socket called the suborbital fenestra.
- The large size of a pair of holes at the tip of the snout called the premaxillary foramina.
- The narrowness of two holes in the palate called interpterygoid vacuities.
- The extension of the internal naris (the part of the nasal cavity that opens in the mouth) far back in the palate.

== Classification ==
When Proplatynotia was named in 1984, it was classified as a platynotan lizard. Platynota is the group that includes monitor lizards and sometimes snakes and mosasaurs. It includes all members of the superfamily Varanoidea. Along with other Cretaceous lizards from Mongolia like Parviderma and Gobiderma, Proplatynotia was called a necrosaurian. Necrosaurians were an evolutionary grade of varanoid lizards that had generalized morphologies, lacking the derived features of monitor lizards and snakes. They were the most primitive platynotans.

Since the first description of Proplatynotia, some features have been recognized that separate it from other platynotans. The teeth of Proplatynotia are smooth and lack plicidentine, folded layers of dentine around the center pulp cavity of the tooth. Plicidentine, while rare in land-living vertebrates, is characteristic of monitor lizards and their closest extinct relatives. The lack of plicidentine in Proplatynotia led to an early hypothesis that it was not a platynotan, but evolved platynotan features through convergence.

Despite its non-platynotan features, Proplatynotia is usually classified as one of the most basal platynotans. In most recent studies, Platynotia includes monitor lizards, helodermatids, and their close extinct relatives, but not snakes. Below is a cladogram from a 2008 phylogenetic study showing the relationships of Proplatynotia:

- Platynota
  - Monstersauria
    - †Gobiderma
    - - †Estesia
      - Heloderma
  - - †Proplatynotia
    - †Saniwides
    - - †Necrosaurus
      - †Parviderma
    - - †Paravaranus
      - Varanoidea
        - †Telmasaurus
        - Varanidae
          - †Saniwa
          - - Varanus
            - - †Cherminotus
              - Lanthanotus
