= Ovoo gurvel =

Ovoo gurvel Temporal range: Late Cretaceous, 80 Ma

Scientific classification
- Kingdom: Animalia
- Phylum: Chordata
- Class: Reptilia
- Order: Squamata
- Suborder: Anguimorpha
- Family: Varanidae
- Genus: †Ovoo; Norell, Gao, & Conrad, 2008
- Species: †O. gurvel

Binomial name
- †Ovoo gurvel Norell, Gao, & Conrad, 2008

Extinct species of lizards

Ovoo gurvel /ˈoʊvoʊ/ is an extinct varanid lizard from the Late Cretaceous of Mongolia. It is one of the smallest and earliest monitor lizards. It was described in 2008. Ovoo possesses a pair of small bones in its skull that are not seen in any other lizard.

== Description and history ==
Ovoo is only known from a fossilized skull cataloged as IGM 3/767 and designated the holotype. The skull was discovered in 2001 near the rich Ukhaa Tolgod fossil site in a locality known as Little Ukhaa. The deposits at Little Uhhaa date back to the Campanian stage of the Late Cretaceous. The generic name is derived from the name of a type of cairn called ovoos that are found along roads near Little Ukhaa. The specific name, gurvel, comes from the Mongolian word for lizard.

Ovoo was very small compared to living monitor lizards, with the exception of the Short-tailed monitor. Nevertheless, the structures of its skull are very similar to those of living monitors. Ovoo shares many similarities with the extinct monitors Aiolosaurus and Cherminotus, which are also known from Little Ukhaa and Ukhaa Tolgod. Differences between these genera are seen in the shape of the bones in the skull. The distinguishing features of Ovoo include:

- Nasals, located behind the nostril openings, that are divided into two bones (in living monitors they are fused into one bone).
- The large size of a pair of holes called premaxillary fenestrae in front of the nostril openings.
- a forward (anteriorly) and medially-projecting process (extension) of the maxilla (the main tooth bearing bone of the upper jaw) separates the premaxilla (the tooth bearing at the front of the snout) from the septomaxilla (a bone associated with the nasal opening)
- The small size of a hole in the septomaxilla bone called the septomaxillary foramen.

The most unusual feature of Ovoo is the presence of two small bones that are not present in any other lizard. When it was first described, these structures were called "mystery bones". The two bones are located between the eye sockets. They are positioned behind the nasal bones and in front of the frontal bones. There are no homologous bones in any other animal, making their presence a mystery.

== Classification ==
Ovoo is one of many Late Cretaceous lizards belonging to a group called Varanoidea, which includes the living monitor and helodermatid lizards and the extinct mosasaurs. Features linking it with these lizards include a rounded snout and a lack of contact between the maxillae and frontal bones. A phylogenetic analysis conducted with its first description placed it within the monitor subfamily Varaninae. Ovoo is the oldest known member of Varaninae. Of the other Mongolian varanoids, Aiolosaurus was placed as a basal member of Varanidae (the family to which Varaninae belongs) and Cherminotus was placed in Lanthanotinae (another subfamily within Varanidae). Because of their age, Ovoo, Aiolosaurus, and Cherminotus may be representatives of the first radiation of monitor lizards. The Late Cretaceous varanoids Saniwides and Telmasaurus are just as old as these lizards and have traditionally been viewed as the oldest monitors, but they were placed outside the monitor family in the 2008 analysis. Below is a cladogram from the analysis:

- Varanoidea
  - †Mosasauria
  - - †"Saniwa" feisti
    - †Necrosaurus cayluxi
    - - - †Saniwides mongoliensis
        - †Telmasaurus grangeri
      - Varanidae (monitor lizards)
        - †Aiolosaurus oriens
        - Lanthanotinae
          - †Cherminotus longifrons
          - Lanthanotus borneensis
        - Varaninae
          - †Ovoo gurvel
          - - †Saniwa ensidens
            - Varanus
