= Telmasaurus =

Telmasaurus Temporal range: Late Cretaceous, 80–71 Ma
- Life restoration

Scientific classification
- Kingdom: Animalia
- Phylum: Chordata
- Class: Reptilia
- Order: Squamata
- Suborder: Anguimorpha
- Superfamily: Varanoidea
- Genus: †Telmasaurus; Gilmore, 1943
- Species: †T. grangeri

Binomial name
- †Telmasaurus grangeri Gilmore, 1943

Extinct genus of lizards

Telmasaurus is an extinct genus of varanoid lizard from the Late Cretaceous of Mongolia. Fossils have been found from the Djadokhta and Barun Goyot Formations that date between the early and middle Campanian stage from approximately 80 to 71 million years ago. The type species Telmasaurus grangeri was named in 1943.

== Description ==
Telmasaurus grangeri was named in 1943 and is now known from several fossils. Only two skulls are known, and the snout region is missing from both. Based on the size of these skulls, Telmasaurus was larger than other Cretaceous varanoid lizards, approaching the size of modern monitor lizards. Its skull is flatter than most other varanoids. The fusion of two bones in the skull called frontals links Telmasaurus with other early varanids like Paravaranus. The lacrimal bone of Telmasaurus has a single hole in it, as do those of other early varanoids. The vertebrae of Telmasaurus are also known, and the way they attach to each other is very different from the way those of modern monitor lizards do. A small crest running between the eye sockets is a distinguishing feature of the genus.

== Classification ==
Telmasaurus was first classified in the family Varanidae, making it a close relative of living monitor lizards. In a 1998 phylogenetic analysis, Telmasaurus was placed in a more basal position within Varanoidea. Under this placement, it was an intermediate form between helodermatids and the group containing monitor lizards and snakes. Below is a cladogram from the 1998 analysis:

- Varanoidea
  - Helodermatidae
  - †Gobidermatidae
  - †Estesia
  - - †Telmasaurus
    - Thecoglossa
      - Pythonomorpha
        - †Mosasauroidea
        - Serpentes
      - - Lanthanotidae
          - †Cherminotus
          - Lanthanotus
        - Varanidae
          - †Saniwa
          - - †Saniwides
            - Varanus

In a 2008 analysis, the basal positioning of Telmasaurus remained well supported, but it was grouped with another varanoid called Saniwides. Saniwides was once classified in Varanidae as a close relative of living monitor lizards. Other Cretaceous varanids like Cherminotus and Aiolosaurus are similar in appearance to Telmasaurus, but Telmasaurus is a more primitive member of Varanoidea. Below is a cladogram from the 2008 analysis:

- Varanoidea
  - †Mosasauria
  - - †"Saniwa" feisti
    - †Necrosaurus cayluxi
    - - - †Saniwides mongoliensis
        - †Telmasaurus grangeri
      - Varanidae (monitor lizards)
        - †Aiolosaurus oriens
        - Lanthanotinae
          - †Cherminotus longifrons
          - Lanthanotus borneensis
        - Varaninae
          - †Ovoo gurvel
          - - †Saniwa ensidens
            - Varanus
