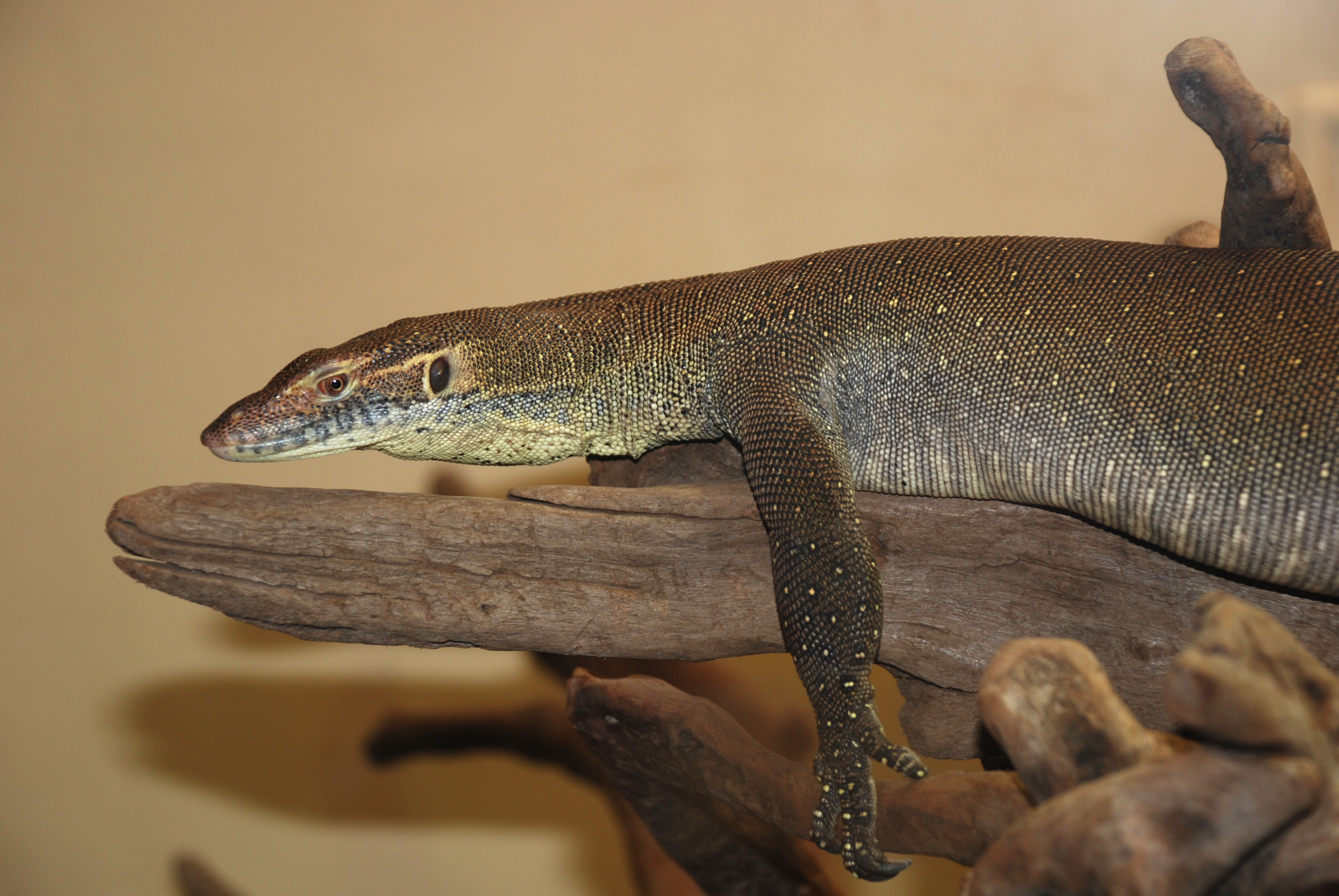
- Smithsonian National Zoological Park

Conservation status
- Endangered (IUCN 3.1)

Scientific classification
- Kingdom: Animalia
- Phylum: Chordata
- Class: Reptilia
- Order: Squamata
- Suborder: Anguimorpha
- Family: Varanidae
- Genus: Varanus
- Subgenus: Varanus
- Species: V. mertensi

Binomial name
- Varanus mertensi Glauert, 1951
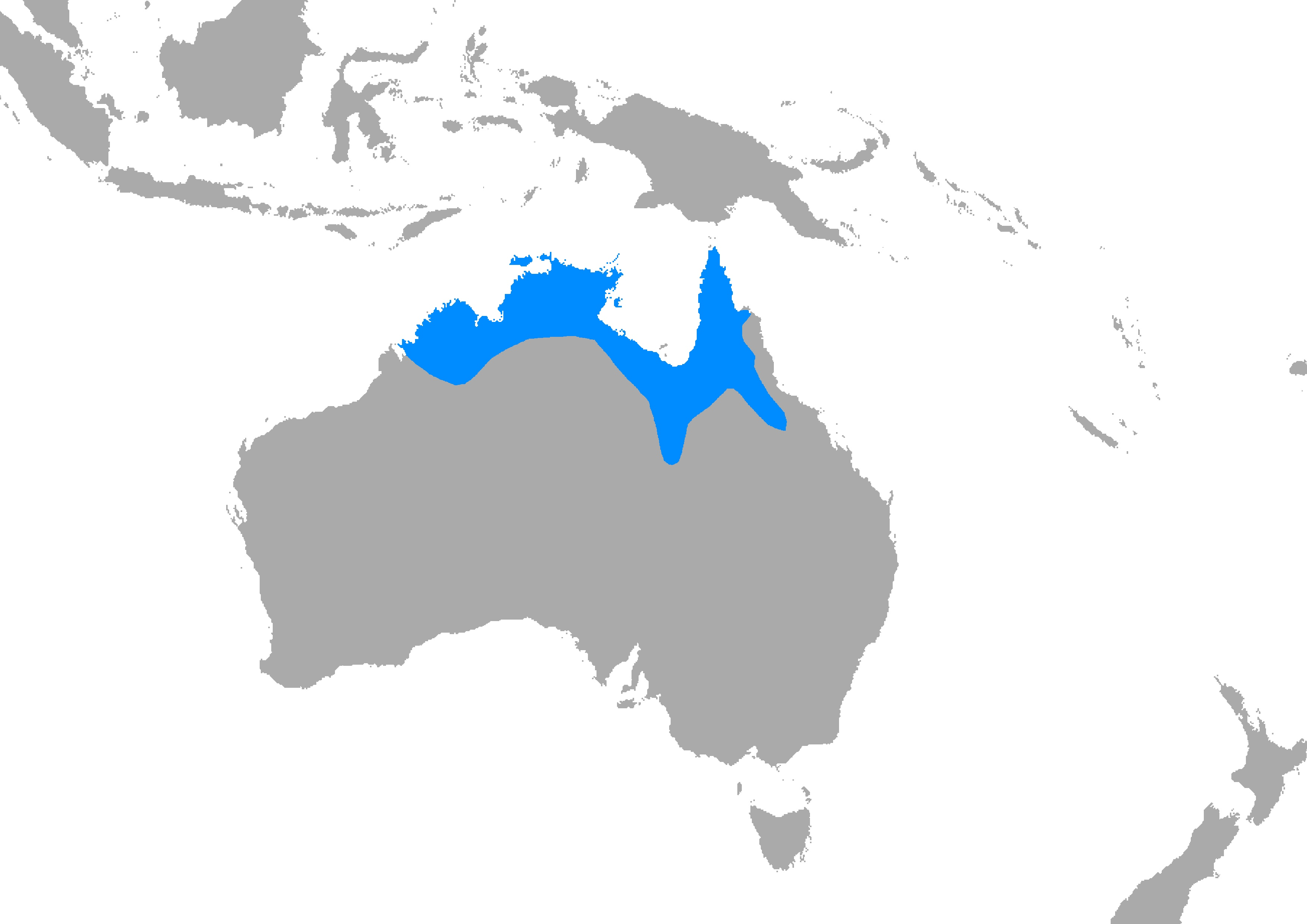

= Mertens' water monitor =

Species of lizard

Mertens' water monitor (Varanus mertensi) is a species of monitor lizard in the family Varanidae. The species is native to northern Australia, and is a wide-ranging, actively foraging, opportunistic predator of aquatic and riparian habitats. It is named after German herpetologist Robert Mertens.

== Description ==
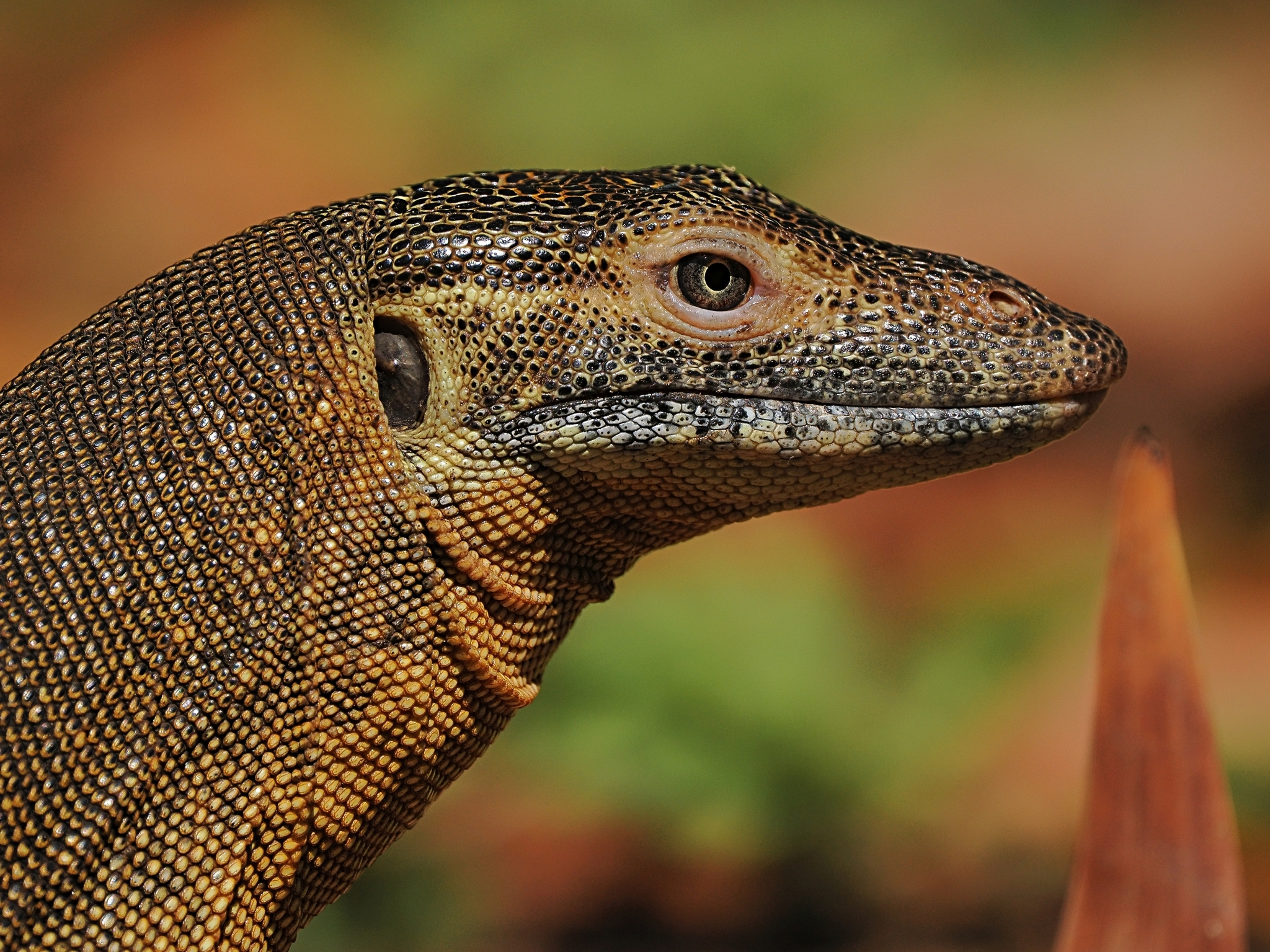
Northern Territory, Australia

Mertens' water monitor grows to a total length (tail included) of about 2.0 m (6.6 ft). It is dark brown to black above, with many cream to yellow spots. The underparts are paler – white to yellowish – with grey mottling on the throat and blue-grey bars on the chest. The tail is strongly compressed laterally, with a high median dorsal keel, and is about 1.5 times the length of head and body.

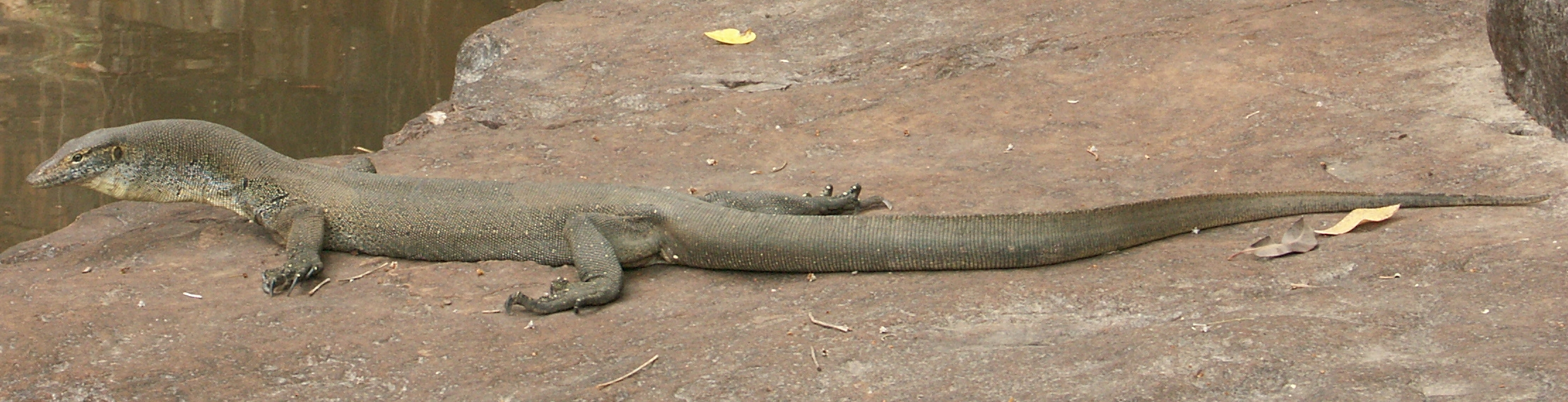
Wyndham, Western Australia

Amongst all monitor species, including even the water monitors of the subgenus Soterosaurus, Mertens' water monitor is morphologically the most well adapted to an aquatic lifestyle, being able to seal its upwards facing nostrils when underwater. It is capable of swallowing prey underwater, which is an ability not reported in any other monitor species other than the Borneo earless monitor (Lanthanotus borneensis). It is also the only monitor species reported capable of using its sense of smell to locate and capture prey underwater.

== Geographic Distribution and habitat ==
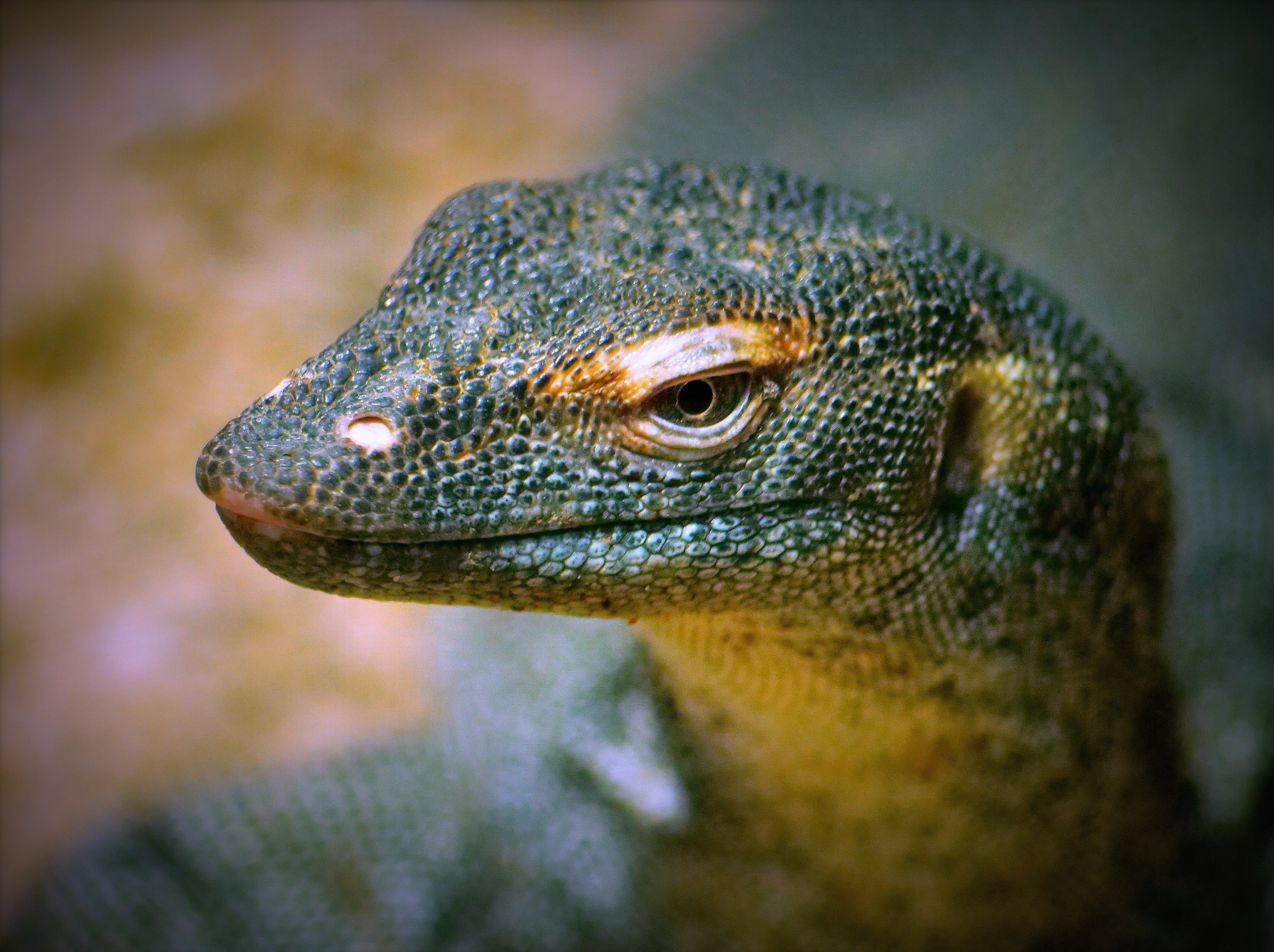
The nostrils of Mertens' water monitor are situated near the top of the snout, and can seal shut when underwater.

Mertens' water monitor is found in coastal and inland waters across much of northern Australia, from the Kimberley region of Western Australia, across the Top End of the Northern Territory and the Gulf Country, to the western side of the Cape York Peninsula in Far North Queensland.

== Behaviour ==
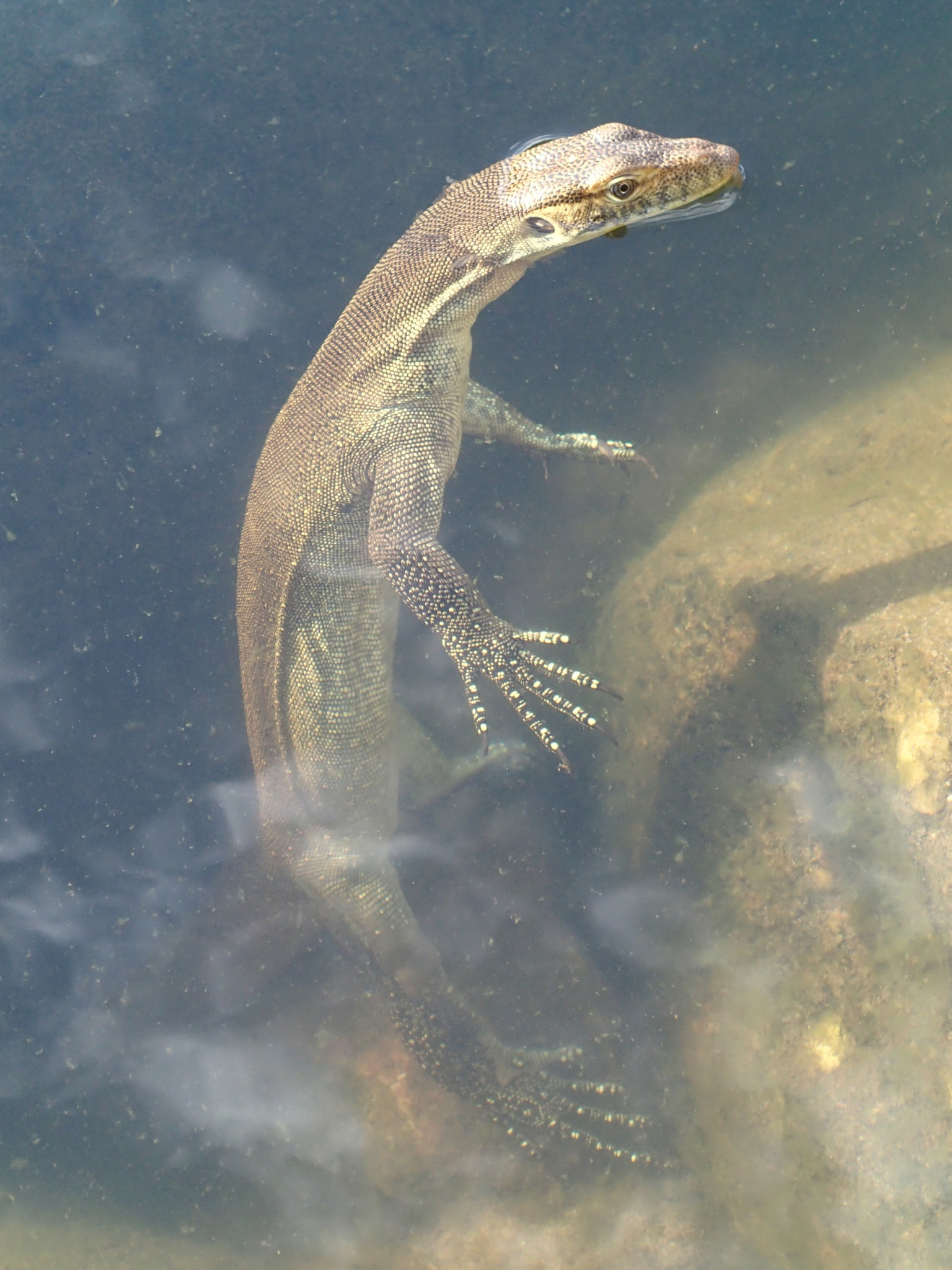
Underwater, Northern Territory, Australia

Mertens' water monitor is semiaquatic, a strong swimmer, and seldom far from water. It is often seen basking on midstream rocks and logs, and on branches overhanging swamps, lagoons, and waterways throughout its range. When disturbed, it drops into the water, where it can stay submerged for long periods. It has been observed sleeping underwater.

=== Feeding ===
Mertens' water monitor feeds both on land and in the water, mainly on fish, frogs, crabs, crayfish, shrimps, amphipods, and carrion, also taking terrestrial vertebrates, insects, spiders, and human rubbish when available. Its diet consists mainly of freshwater Holthuisana crabs, which are reported to make up 29–83.7%? of the biomass found in gut and scat samples. An amount of 11.5% of prey biomass was found to be fish. While eggs and frogs are infrequently eaten, large amounts of them are eaten when found. Arthropods including spiders, beetles and water bugs, while frequently eaten, make up a small proportion of ingested prey biomass. It has a good sense of smell and may dig up prey when foraging, including the eggs of freshwater turtles.

=== Breeding ===
Mertens' water monitor lays eggs in a burrow, usually with egg-laying taking place early in the dry season and hatching in the following wet season. The eggs hatch within 200–300 days after laying, depending on temperature, with the hatchlings able to enter the water and swim immediately.

== Conservation and status ==
Mertens' water monitor is threatened by the spread of cane toads through its range, through poisoning after eating them. Because of this V. mertensi is listed as Vulnerable under Northern Territory legislation.

== Gallery ==
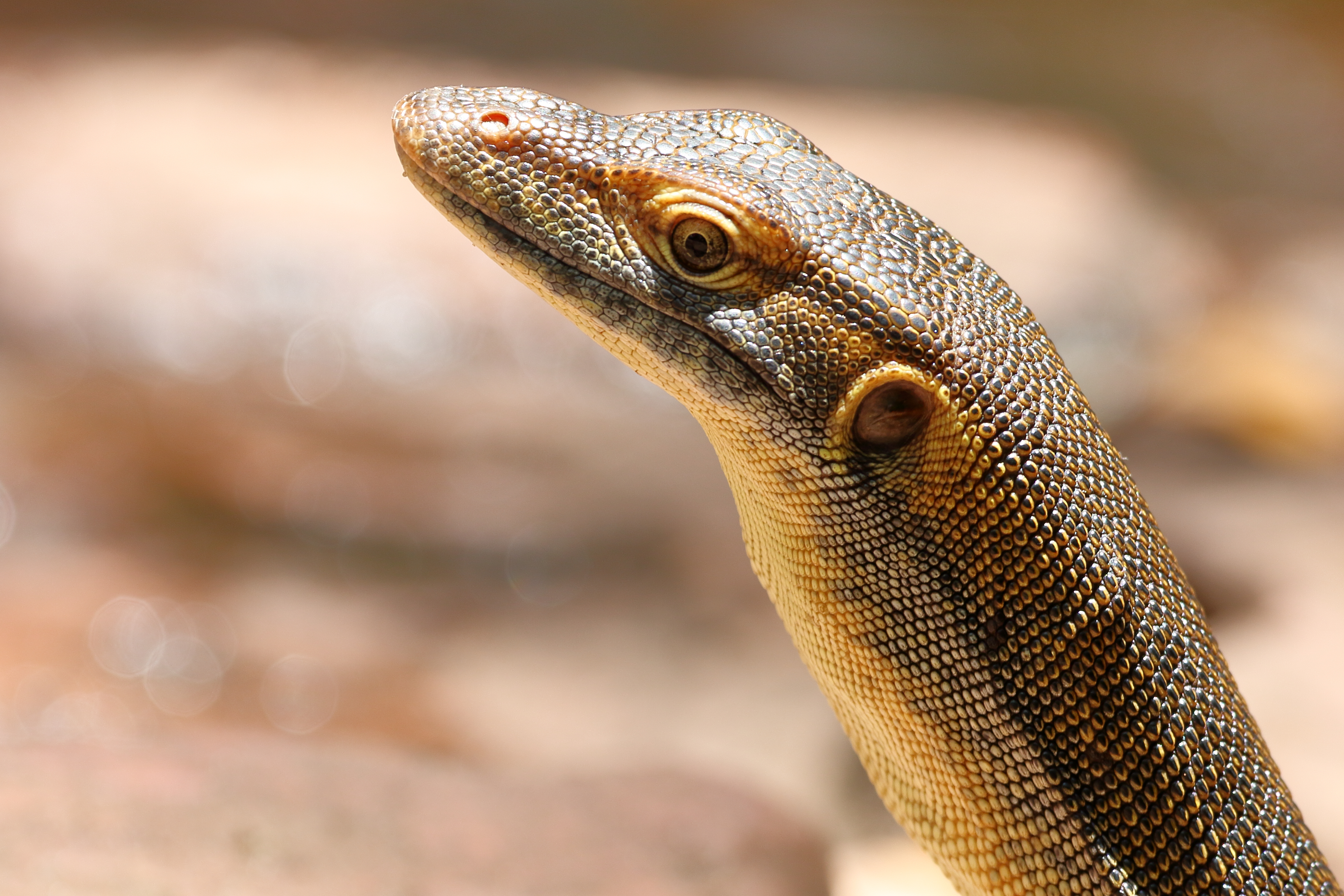
Portrait of Mertens' water monitor in the Northern Territory

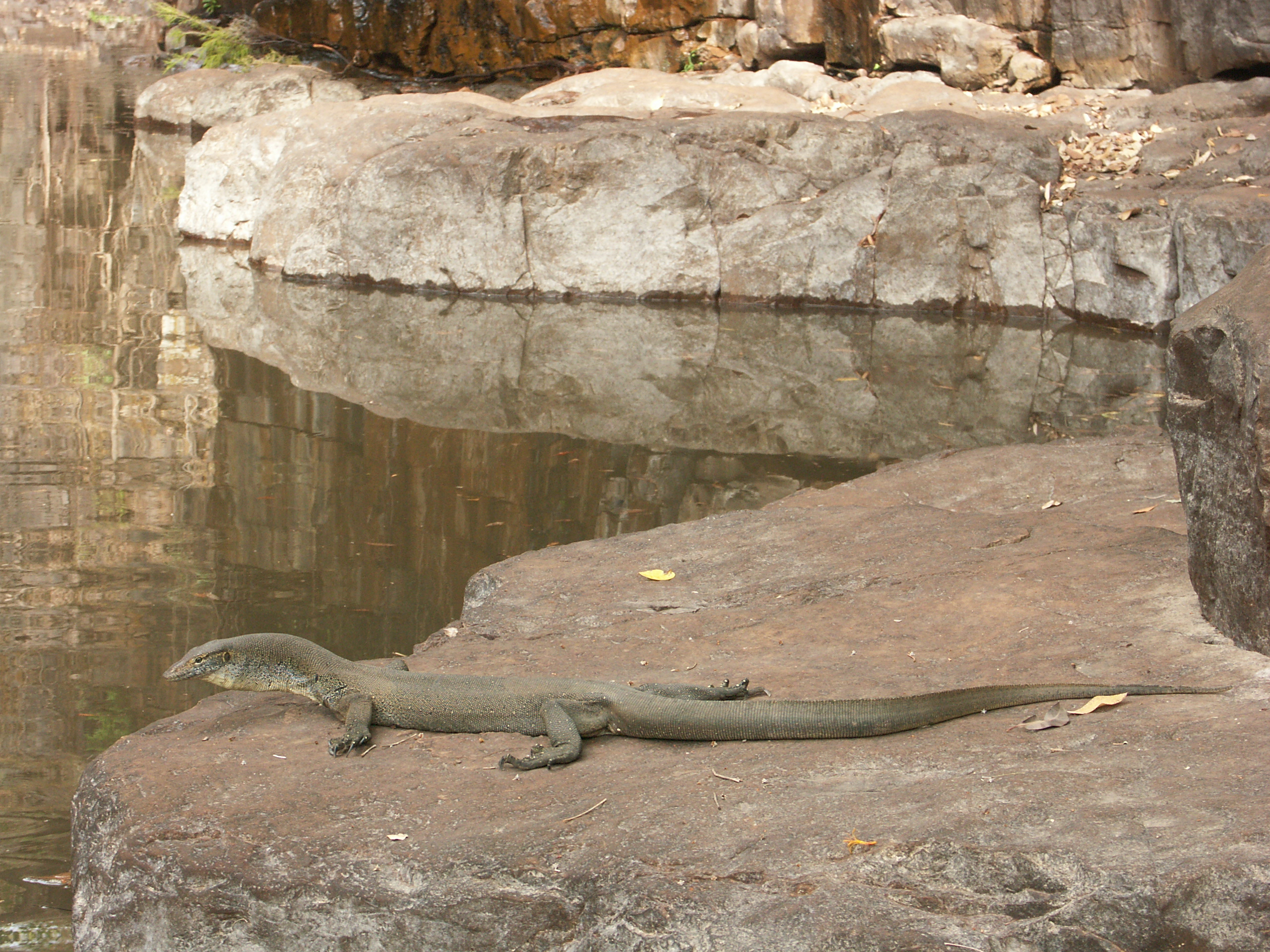
Mertens' water monitor at the Grotto waterhole near Wyndham, Western Australia

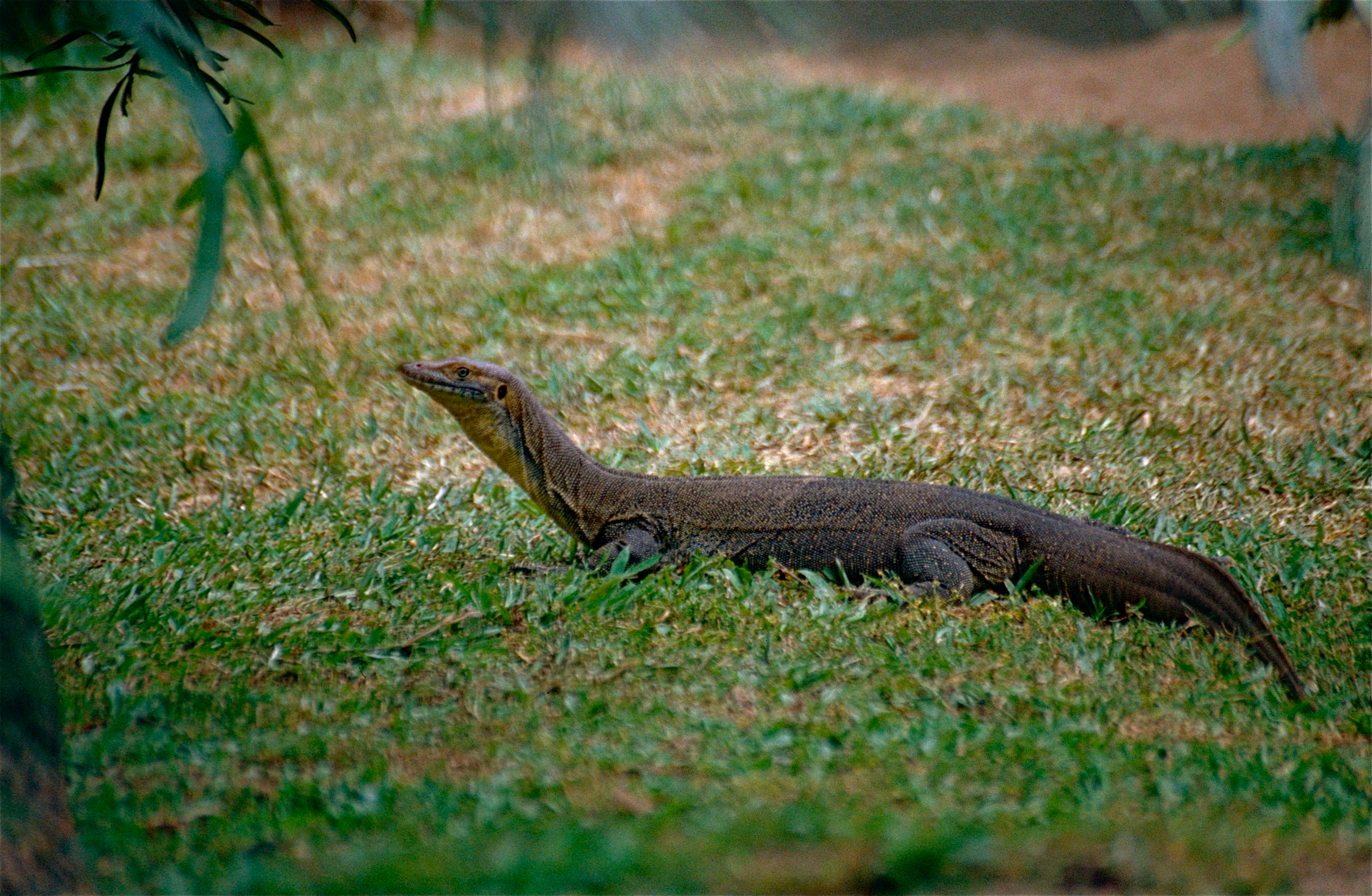
Australia Zoo

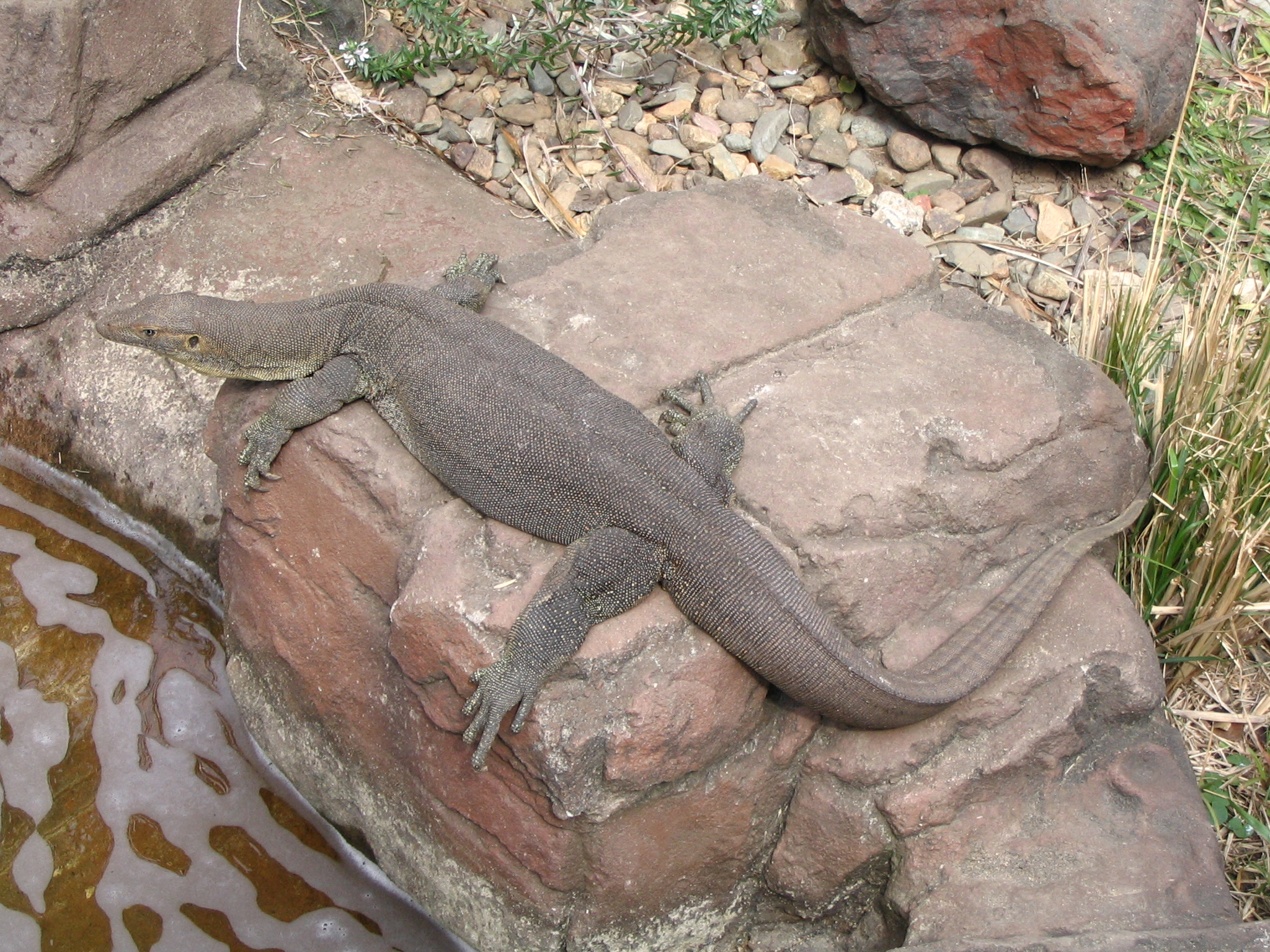
Australia Zoo

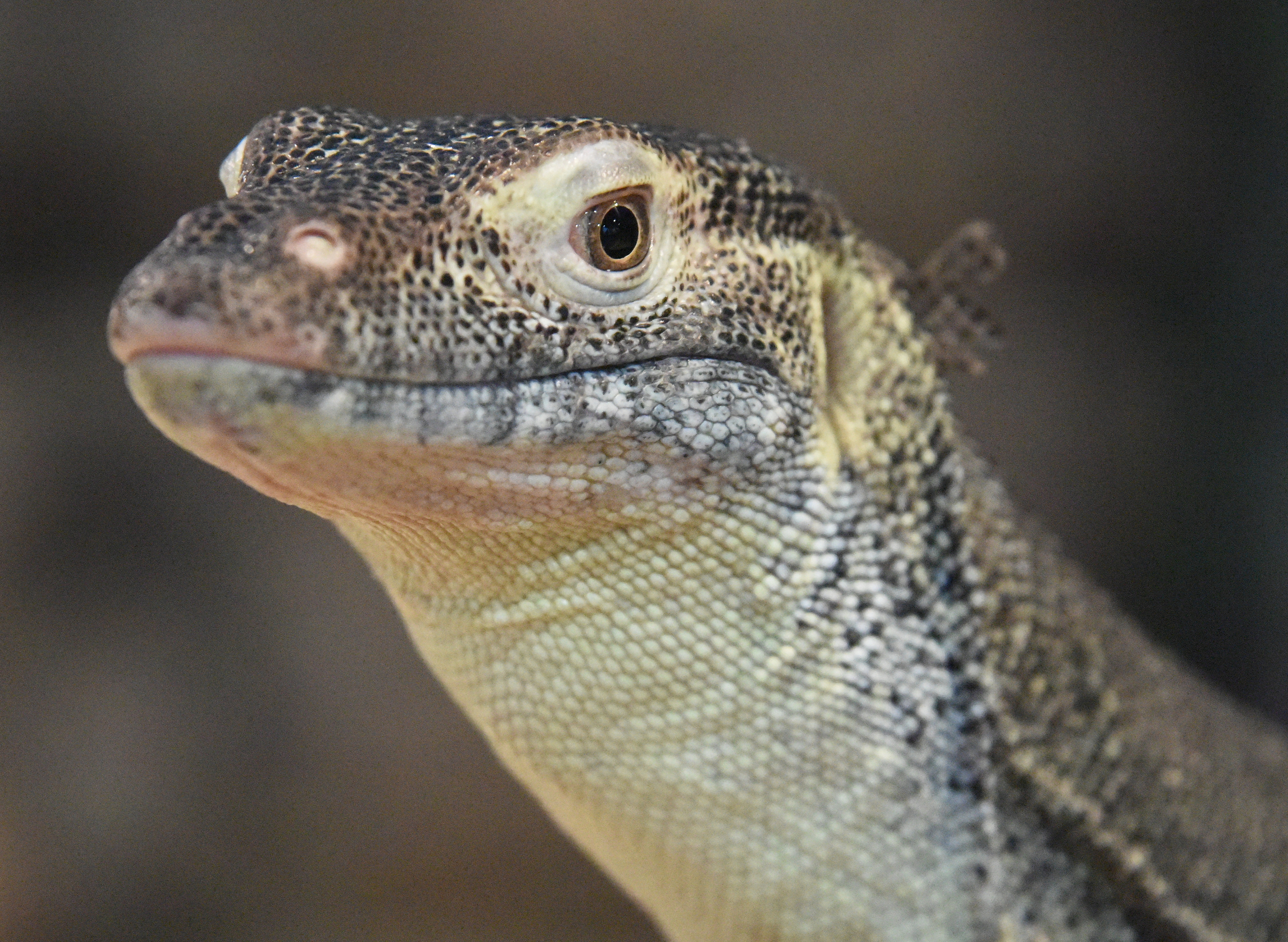
Featherdale Wildlife Park

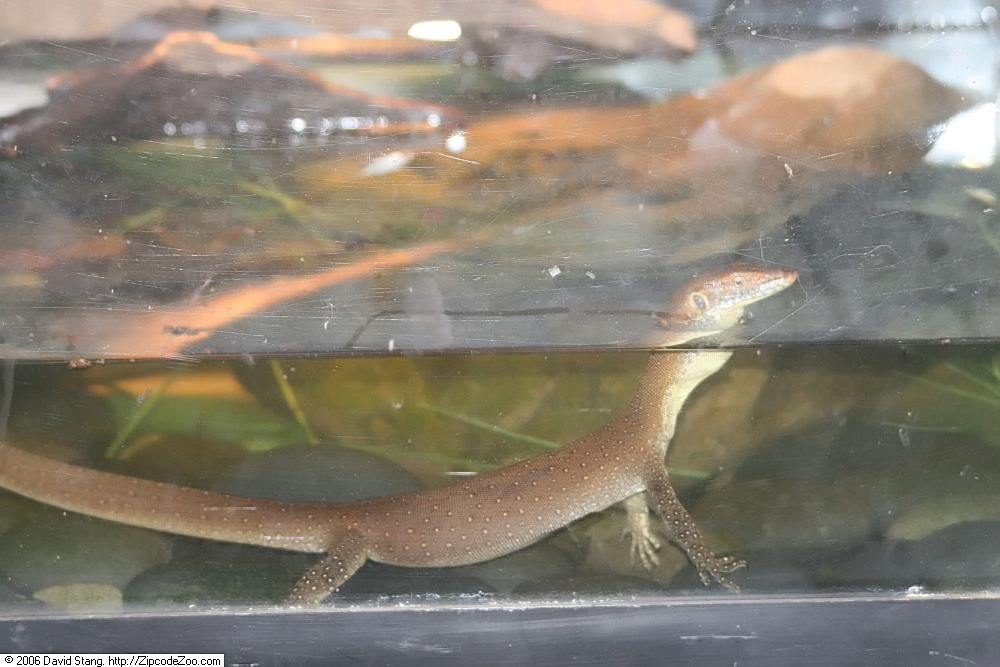
Bronx Zoo

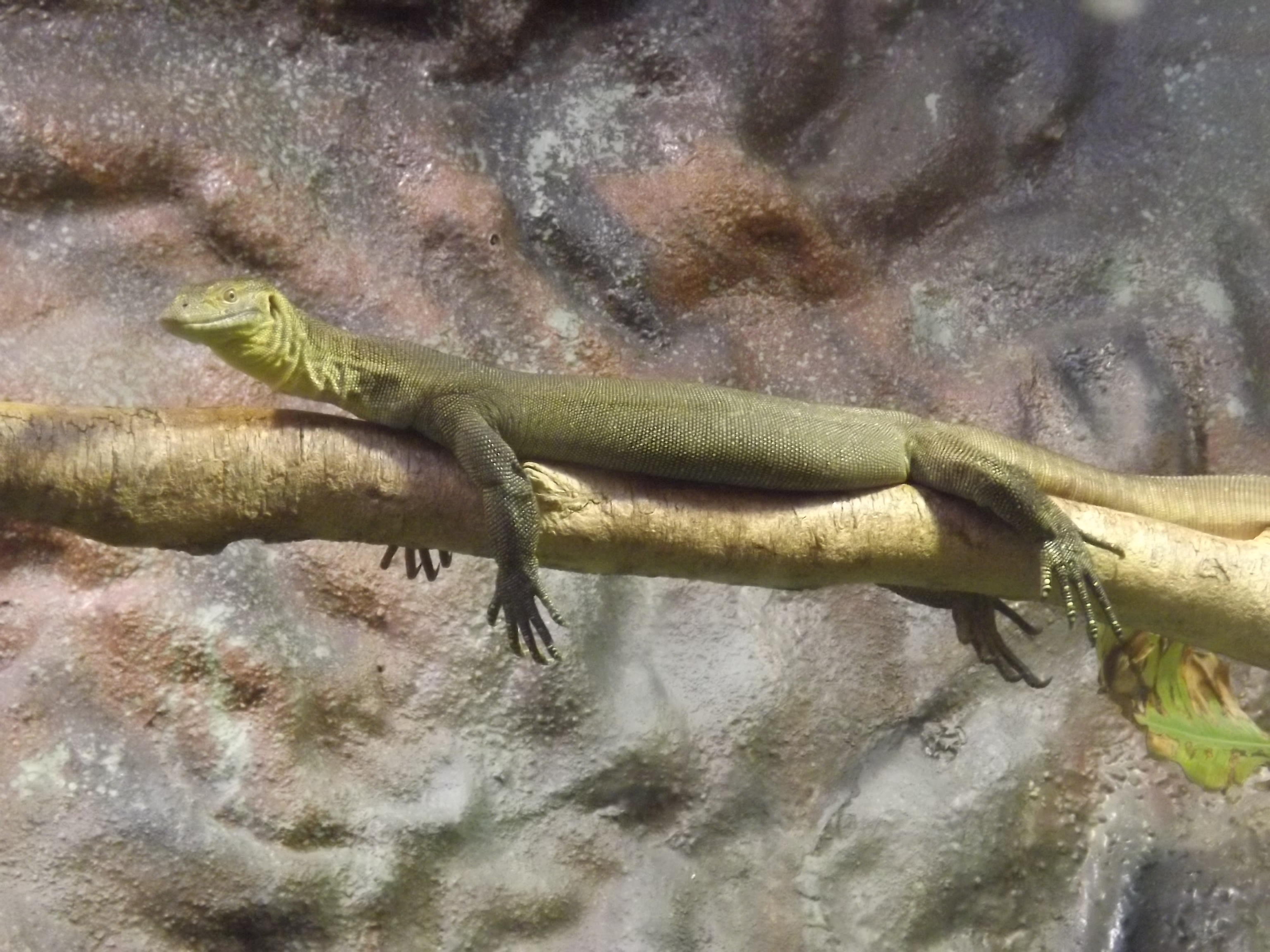
Healesville Sanctuary
