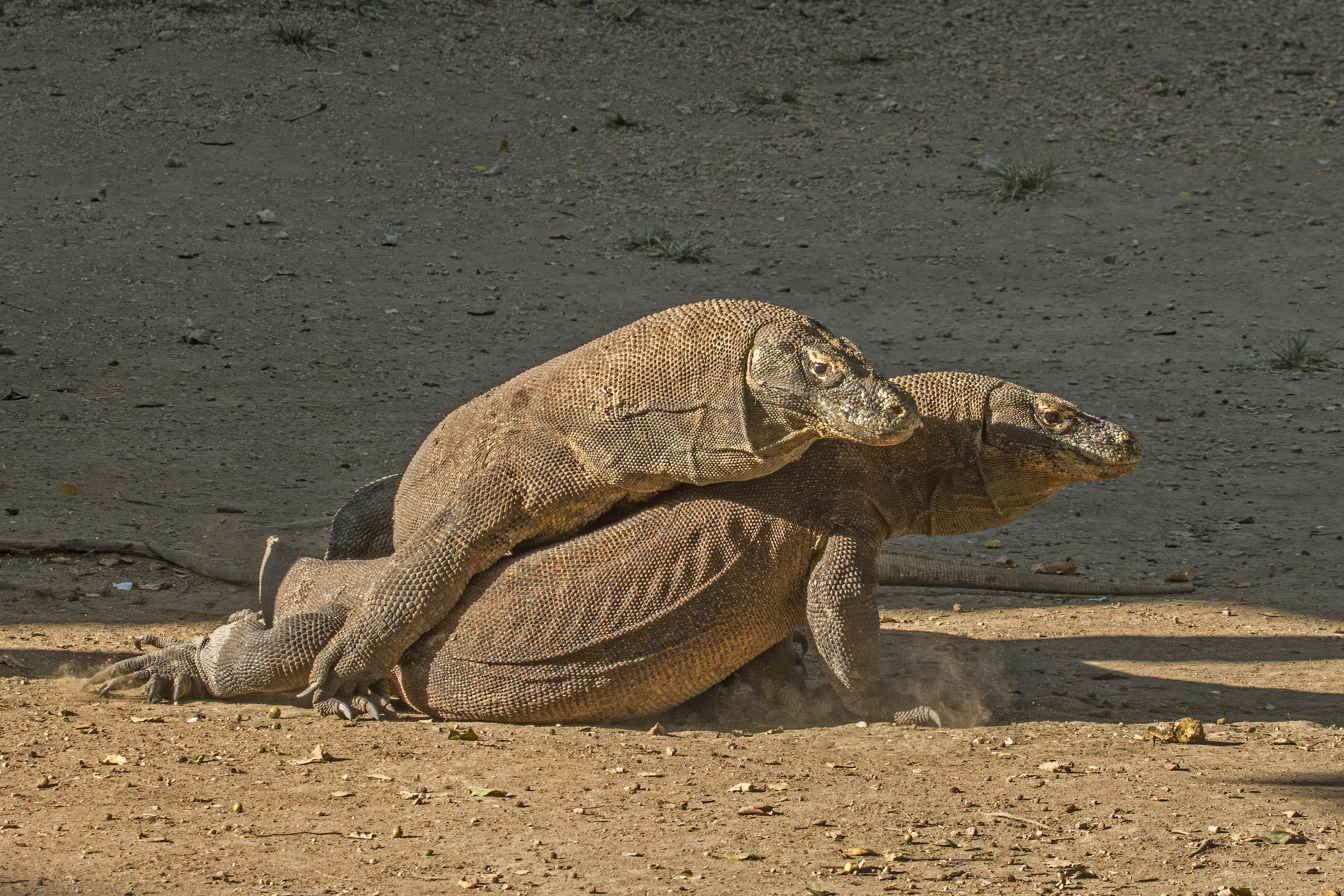
- Male Komodo dragons (Varanus komodoensis) fighting, Indonesia
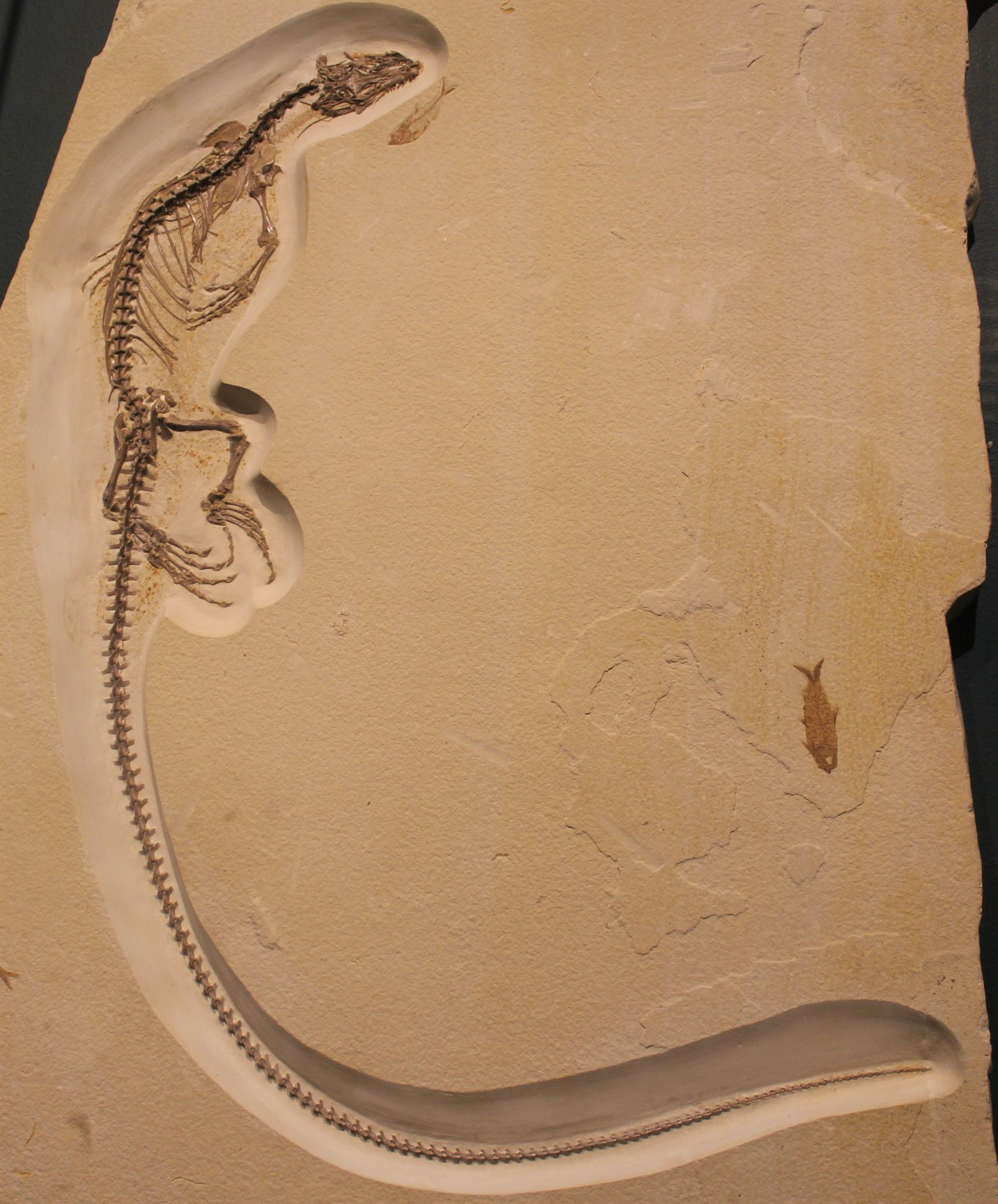
- Fossil of Saniwa, an extinct varanid known from the Eocene of North America

Scientific classification
- Kingdom: Animalia
- Phylum: Chordata
- Class: Reptilia
- Order: Squamata
- Suborder: Anguimorpha
- Superfamily: Varanoidea
- Family: Varanidae; Merrem, 1820

Genera
- Varanus; †Aiolosaurus; †Archaeovaranus; †Ovoo; †Paravaranus; †Proplatynotia; †Saniwa; †Saniwides; †Telmasaurus
- Varanidae distribution

= Varanidae =

Varanids Temporal range: Late Cretaceous – Holocene, 80–0 Ma

Family of lizards

The Varanidae are a family of lizards in the superfamily Varanoidea and suborder Anguimorpha. The family, a group of carnivorous and frugivorous lizards, includes the living genus Varanus and a number of extinct genera more closely related to Varanus than to the earless monitor lizard (Lanthanotus). Varanus includes the Komodo dragon (the largest living lizard), crocodile monitor, savannah monitor, the goannas of Australia and Southeast Asia, and various other species with a similarly distinctive appearance. Their closest living relatives are the earless monitor lizard and Chinese crocodile lizard. The oldest members of the family are known from the Late Cretaceous of Mongolia.

== Taxonomy ==
The Varanidae were defined (using morphological characteristics) by Estes, de Queiroz and Gauthier (1988) as the clade containing the most recent common ancestor of Lanthanotus and Varanus and all of its descendants. A similar definition was formulated by Conrad et al. (2008) (also using morphological data), who defined the Varanidae as the clade containing Varanus varius, Lanthanotus borneensis, and all descendants of their last common ancestor. Using one of these definitions leads to the inclusion of the earless monitor lizard (L. borneensis) in the family Varanidae.

Lee (1997) created a different definition of the Varanidae, defining them as the clade containing Varanus and all taxa more closely related to Varanus than to Lanthanotus; this definition explicitly excludes the earless monitor lizard from the Varanidae. Whether L. borneensis is included in or excluded from the Varanidae depends on the author; for example, Vidal et al. (2012) classify the earless monitor lizard as a member of a separate family Lanthanotidae, while Gauthier et al. (2012) classify it as a member of Varanidae.

=== Genera ===
Genera marked with † are extinct

Genera included in Varanidae according to Dong et al., 2022

- †Ovoo Norell, Gao, & Conrad, 2008 (Mongolia, Late Cretaceous)
- †Aiolosaurus Gao and Norell, 2000 (Mongolia, Late Cretaceous)
- †Cherminotus Borsuk-Bialynicka, 1984 (Mongolia, Late Cretaceous)
- †Saniwides Borsuk-Bialynicka, 1984 (Mongolia, Late Cretaceous)
- †Paravaranus Borsuk-Bialynicka, 1984 (Mongolia, Late Cretaceous)
- †Proplatynotia Borsuk-Bialynicka, 1984 (Mongolia, Late Cretaceous)
- †Telmasaurus Gilmore, 1943 (Mongolia, Late Cretaceous)
- †Saniwa Leidy, 1870 (Europe, North America, Eocene)
- †Archaeovaranus Dong et al., 2022 (China, Eocene)
- Varanus Shaw, 1790

=== Phylogeny ===
Below is a cladogram from Dong et al. 2022.

- Varanidae
  - †Ovoo gurvel
  - - - †Telmasaurus grangeri
      - - †Aiolosaurus oriens
        - †Saniwides mongoliensis
    - - - †Paravaranus angustifrons
        - †Proplatynotia longirostrata
      - - †Saniwa ensidens
        - - †Archaeovaranus lii
          - Varanus

== Biology ==
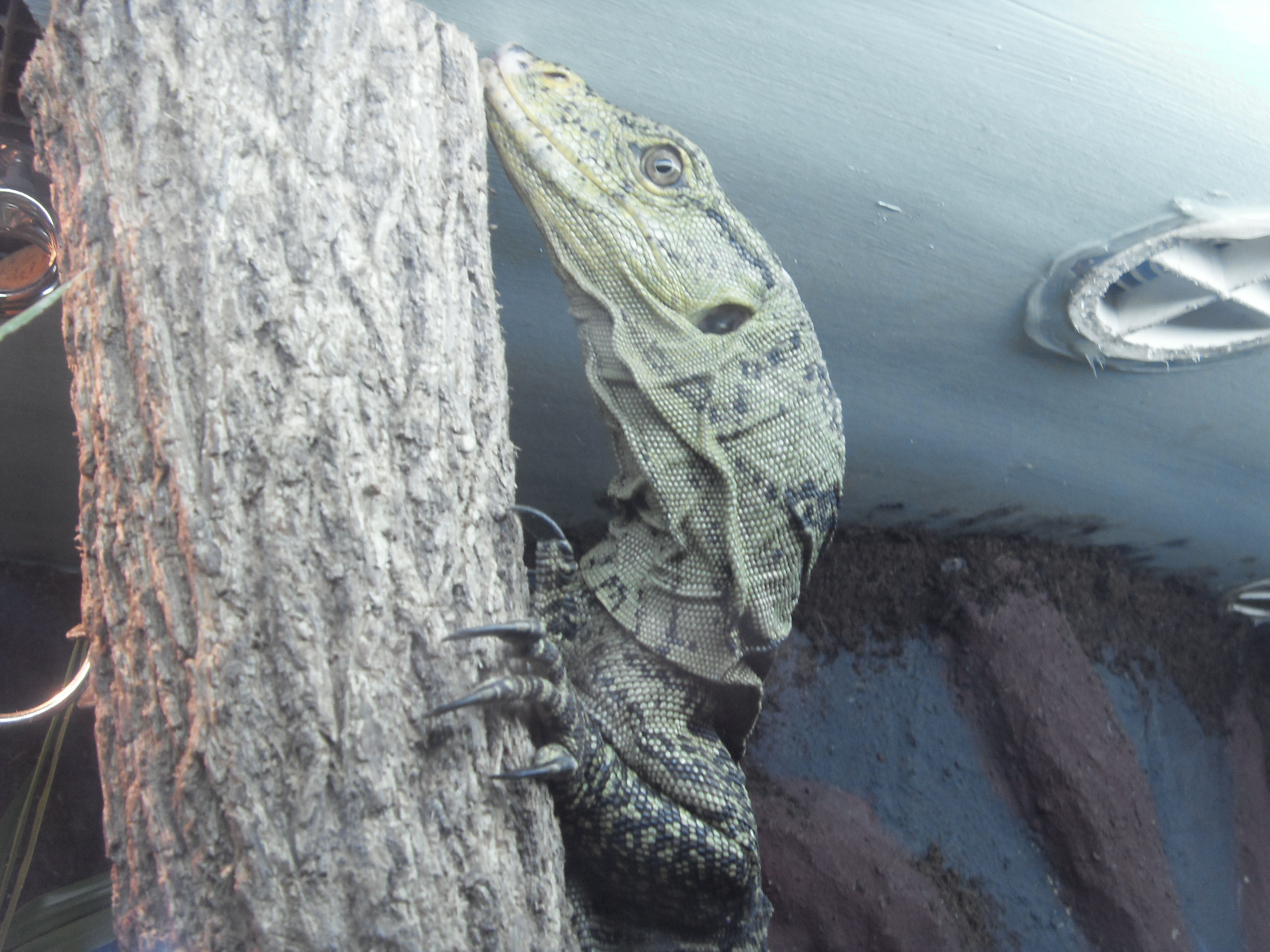
Gray's monitor (Varanus olivaceus) is a tree-dwelling varanid from the Philippines that primarily feeds on fruit

Monitor lizards are reputed to be among the most intelligent lizards. Most species forage widely and have large home ranges, and many have high stamina. Although most species are carnivorous, three arboreal species in the Philippines (Varanus olivaceus, Varanus mabitang, and Varanus bitatawa) are primarily frugivores. Among species of living varanids, the limbs show positive allometry, being larger in larger-bodied species, although the feet become smaller as compared with the lengths of the other limb segments.

Varanids possess unidirectional pulmonary airflow, including air-sacs akin to those of birds.
