= Aiolosaurus =

Aiolosaurus Temporal range: Late Cretaceous, 80 Ma

Scientific classification
- Kingdom: Animalia
- Phylum: Chordata
- Class: Reptilia
- Order: Squamata
- Suborder: Anguimorpha
- Genus: †Aiolosaurus; Gao and Norell, 2000
- Species: †A. oriens

Binomial name
- †Aiolosaurus oriens Gao and Norell, 2000

Extinct genus of lizards

Aiolosaurus is an extinct genus of monitor lizard from the Late Cretaceous of Mongolia. The type and only species, Aiolosaurus oriens, was named in 2000 from Ukhaa Tolgod, a rich fossil site in the Campanian-age Djadochta Formation.

== Description and history ==
Aiolosaurus was named in 2000 on the basis of a single holotype specimen cataloged as IGM 3/171. This specimen includes a partial skull and parts of the postcranial skeleton. Aiolosaurus is named after Aeolus, the Greek god of wind, while the specific name of A. oriens means "east." Diagnostic features of Aiolosaurus are found mainly in the skull. They include:

- The division of the nasals into two bones (they form one bone in living monitors).
- A small hole in the snout between the premaxilla and maxilla bones called the premaxillary fenestra.
- The separation of the premaxilla and septomaxilla bones by a projection of the maxilla bone.
- The small size of another hole in the snout called the septomaxillary foramen.
- Near the jaw joint, a hole in the surangular bone of the lower jaw that is positioned underneath the coronoid process of the upper jaw.

== Classification ==
Aiolosaurus was initially classified as a basal member of Varanoidea, the superfamily that includes monitor lizards, helodermatids, and mosasaurs. Cherminotus, another Late Cretaceous varanoid from Mongolia, was also classified in this way. In a 2008 phylogenetic analysis, Aiolosaurus was classified as a member of Varanidae. It was placed in the subfamily Lanthanotinae along with Cherminotus and the living Earless monitor lizard. Another 2008 analysis supported the placement of Aiolosaurus in Varanidae but did not find it to be a member of Lanthanotinae. Instead, it was found to be a more basal varanid. As some of the earliest monitor lizards, Aiolosaurus, Cherminotus, and the related Ovoo are representative of the first evolutionary radiation of varanids.
