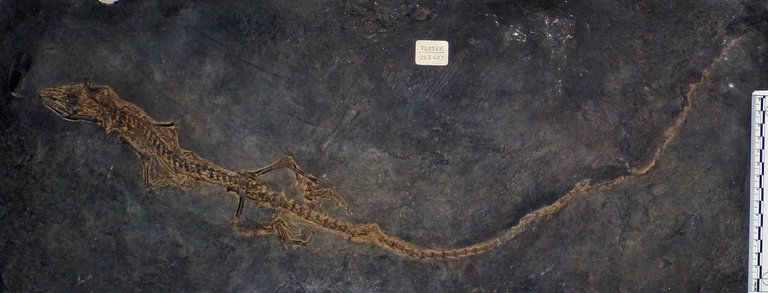

Scientific classification
- Kingdom: Animalia
- Phylum: Chordata
- Class: Reptilia
- Order: Squamata
- Suborder: Anguimorpha
- Family: †Palaeovaranidae; Georgalis, 2017
- Genus: †Palaeovaranus; Zittel, 1887

Type species
- Palaeovaranus cayluxi Zittel, 1887

Other species
- Palaeovaranus giganteus (Kuhn, 1940)

Synonyms
- Genus-level: Palaeosaurus Filhol, 1873 (preoccupied); Necrosaurus Filhol, 1876; Melanosauroides Kuhn, 1940; P. cayluxi: Palaeosaurus cayluxi Filhol, 1873; Necrosaurus cayluxi Filhol, 1876; P. giganteus: Melanosauroides giganteus Kuhn, 1940; Melanosauroides maximus McDowell & Bogert, 1954 (lapsus calami)

= Palaeovaranus =

Palaeovaranus Temporal range: Late Eocene, 37.2–33.9 Ma

Extinct genus of lizards

Palaeovaranus is an extinct genus of varanoid lizards from the Late Eocene of France and Germany. It contains two species, Palaeovaranus cayluxensis and Palaeovaranus giganteus (formerly assigned to a separate genus Melanosauroides). The genus was first named by Henri Filhol in 1877, but he had named the species Palaeovaranus cayluxi earlier as Palaeosaurus cayluxi in 1873, and as Necrosaurus cuxleyi in 1876 after it was discovered that Palaeosaurus was preoccupied. However, he failed to provide any kind of valid description, which renders Karl Alfred Ritter von Zittel's 1887 description of the taxon as the valid authority on its validity. Despite this, the name Necrosaurus was the widely used name in the literature afterwards until 2017, when the name Palaeovaranus was revived. It is placed in the family Palaeovaranidae.
