= Cherminotus =

Cherminotus Temporal range: Late Cretaceous, 75 Ma

Scientific classification
- Domain: Eukaryota
- Kingdom: Animalia
- Phylum: Chordata
- Class: Reptilia
- Order: Squamata
- Family: Lanthanotidae
- Genus: †Cherminotus; Borsuk-Bialynicka, 1984
- Species: †C. longifrons

Binomial name
- †Cherminotus longifrons Borsuk-Bialynicka, 1984

Extinct genus of lizards

Cherminotus is an extinct genus of varanoid lizard from the Late Cretaceous of Mongolia. The type and only species, Cherminotus longifrons, was named in 1984.

== Description and history ==
Cherminotus longifrons was first described in 1984 from the Barun Goyot Formation. More specimens were later found in the Djadokhta Formation in localities such as Ukhaa Tolgod.

Cherminotus is small for a varanoid and has a longer snout than its closest living relative, the Earless monitor lizard. Cherminotus is also very similar in appearance to Aiolosaurus, another varanoid from the Cretaceous of Mongolia. Both lizards have a single hole in the lacrimal bone called the lacrimal foramen. Other varanoids have two holes in the lacrimal, making the presence of only one hole in Cherminotus a case of evolutionary reversal.
