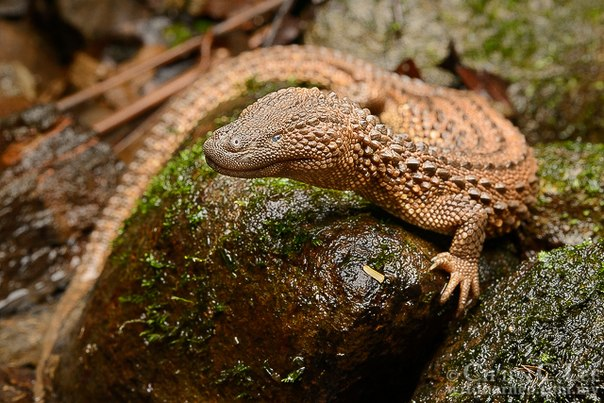

Conservation status
- Endangered (IUCN 3.1)
- CITES Appendix II

Scientific classification
- Kingdom: Animalia
- Phylum: Chordata
- Class: Reptilia
- Order: Squamata
- Suborder: Anguimorpha
- Superfamily: Varanoidea
- Family: Lanthanotidae; Steindachner, 1877
- Genus: Lanthanotus; Steindachner, 1878
- Species: L. borneensis

Binomial name
- Lanthanotus borneensis Steindachner, 1878
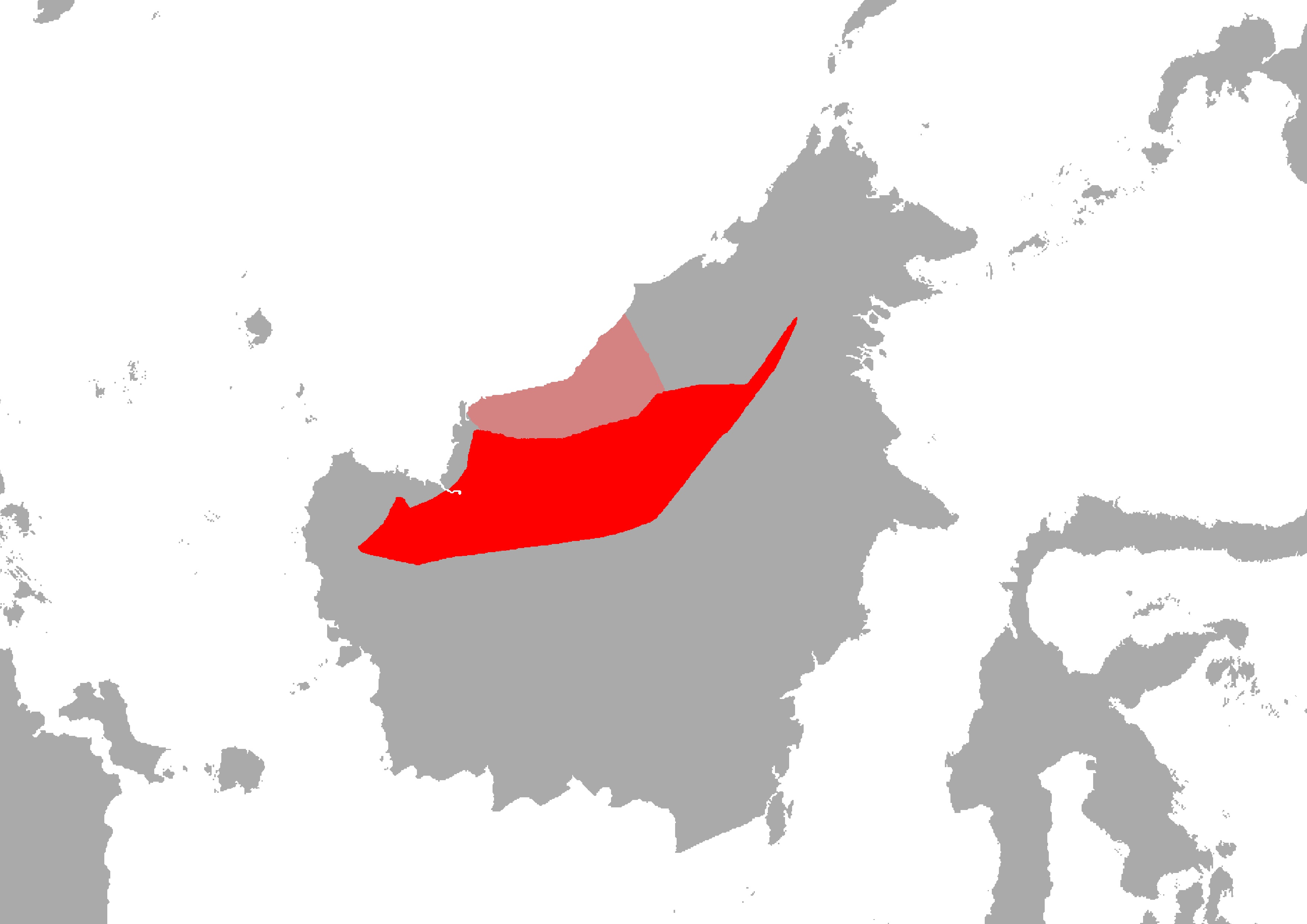
- Red: extant Light red: possibly extinct

= Earless monitor lizard =

Species of lizard

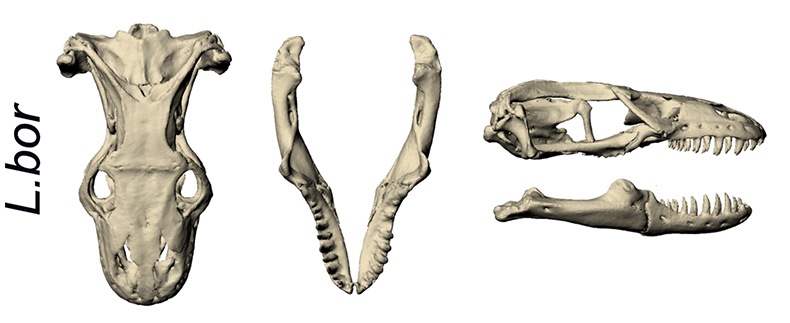
Earless monitor skull

The earless monitor lizard (Lanthanotus borneensis) is a semiaquatic, brown lizard native to the Southeast Asian island of Borneo. It is the only living species in the family Lanthanotidae and is related to the true monitor lizards.

== Taxonomy ==
The earless monitor lizard was described in 1878 by Franz Steindachner. The genus name Lanthanotus means "hidden ear" and the species name borneensis refers to its home island of Borneo. The uniqueness of the species was immediately recognized and Steindachner placed it in its own family, Lanthanotidae. In 1899, George Albert Boulenger relegated it to the family Helodermatidae, together with the beaded lizards and Gila monster, on the basis of morphological similarities. Further studies were conducted in the 1950s where it was found that although it is related to Helodermatidae, this relationship is relatively distant. The similarity is in part the result of convergent evolution and they should be recognized as separate families. Both are part of a broader Anguimorpha, but the relationship among the various families has been a matter of dispute. Several earlier studies have placed the earless monitor lizard together with Helodermatidae and Varanidae (true monitor lizards) in Varanoidea. More recent genetic evidence has found that the nearest relative of the earless monitor lizard is Varanidae. Most authorities continue to recognize them as separate families as the divergence between them is deep, but some have suggested that the earless monitor lizard should be included as a subfamily, Lanthanotinae, of the Varanidae. Together they form a clade and its sister group is Shinisauridae; at a higher level the sister groups of these three are Helodermatidae and others families in Anguimorpha. The most recent common ancestor diverged in the mid-Cretaceous.

The extinct Cherminotus known from Late Cretaceous fossil remains in Mongolia has been considered a member of Lanthanotidae, but this is disputed.

== Distribution and habitat ==
The earless monitor lizard is endemic to the Southeast Asian island of Borneo, where it is known from Sarawak in East Malaysia, as well as West and North Kalimantan in Indonesia. Until late 2012, its known range in North Kalimantan was a part of East Kalimantan. It was also confirmed to be found in Brunei for the first time in 2022, in the country's Temburong District. Prior to the discovery, it was believed that they may occur there and has been recorded c. 100 km (60 mi) from the border. There are no records from Sabah, Central Kalimantan or South Kalimantan.

It is found in lowlands at elevations below 300 m (1,000 ft) near streams and marshes. These are typically in rainforests, but it is also found in streams flowing through degraded habitats such as agricultural land, mature fruit tree gardens and palm oil plantations, and reportedly may occur in rice paddies. The streams it inhabits are often rocky. Its habitat is tropical with air and water temperatures that generally are about 22–29 °C (72–84 °F), and captives reportedly prefer 24–28 °C (75–82 °F). At a site with a high density of earless monitor lizards the water was clear and had a neutral pH. It is associated with the same microhabitat as Tropidophorus water skinks and in some places its range overlaps with T. brookei.

== Appearance ==
Earless monitor lizards have a cylindrical body, long neck, short limbs, long sharp claws, small eyes, semitransparent lower eyelids, and six longitudinal rows of strongly keeled scales. The species is extensively covered in osteoderms. Despite the name, they are capable of hearing, although lack a tympanum, an ear opening and other externally visible signs of ears. The upperparts are orangish-brown, and the underside is mottled dark brown and whitish, pale yellowish, ochre or rusty. The tail is prehensile and if it is lost, it is not regenerated. The skin is shed infrequently, possibly less than once a year. There are both reports of the skin shedding in one piece (similar to snakes), or in smaller pieces (as typical of lizards). Overall the sexes are alike, but males have a distinctly broader head and broader tail base than females. The differences between the sexes are clearly noticeable from an age of about three years. They sometimes oscillate the throat (similar to frogs) and the forked tongue is sometimes flicked (similar to snakes). They can make a gentle, squeaky vocalization.

=== Size ===
Adult earless monitor lizards typically have a snout-to-vent length (SVL) of about 20 cm (8 in), and a total length of about 40 cm (16 in). Eighteen wild individuals, six males and twelve females, ranged from 15.6 to 22 cm (6.1–8.7 in) in SVL, 17.4 to 22.1 cm (6.9–8.7 in) in tail length (disregarding one individual missing much of its tail), and 48 to 120 g (1.7–4.2 oz) in weight (disregarding one sickly and skinny individual). Among these, the largest total length (SVL+tail) was a male that measured 44.1 cm (17.4 in), which also is the longest recorded in the wild. A specimen collected in the 1960s has a total length of 51 cm (20 in), and near the time of its death an individual kept at the Bronx Zoo from 1968 to 1976 had a total length of 47 cm (18.5 in) and weighed 209 g (7.4 oz), but it was highly obese. When hatching the total length of the young is about 7–14 cm (3–6 in). When one year old, their total length is about 23–25 cm (9–10 in). The record size of earless monitor is 55 cm.

== Behavior ==
Earless monitor lizards are generally strictly nocturnal animals, although exceptional daytime observations in the open have been reported. The day is usually spent near water in burrows that can be up to 30 cm (1 ft) long or under logs, rocks or vegetation. They are generally quite inactive and not agile, but can make surprisingly fast spurts when startled, and will rapidly catch prey items placed in front of them. During one study where 19 individuals were located during the night, about half were in the water and the other half near water on land. In captivity they sometimes remain virtually immobile underwater for hours, periodically lifting the nose above the water's surface to breathe. When underwater, the semitransparent lower eyelids are generally closed, covering the eyes. It has been speculated that the prehensile tail is wrapped around stones, roots and other things underwater to avoid being swept along during floods.

=== Bite ===
Although generally docile and inactive when handled, males are usually more aggressive than females when caught. In one case, a scientist received a deep bite in his finger, but did not experience any effects to indicate the presence of venom in the bite (unlike the related and venomous beaded lizards, Gila monster and some monitor lizards). This supported decades-old dissection studies where no venom glands or grooves in the teeth were found. Others kept in captivity were found to bite often, resulting in wounds that are relatively deep (compared to those from similar-sized lizards) and can bleed extensively, with blood clotting reportedly being slower than in normal wounds. Recent studies have found both venom glands, and toxic compounds in the bite of this species. The main components are kallikreins (to a lesser degree CRiSP) with the primary effect being the cleaving of fibrinogen, which is important for blood clotting. However, this effect is quite weak in the venom of the earless monitor lizard compared to that of many other venomous reptiles, including some of the true monitor lizards.

=== Feeding ===
They typically feed on earthworms, crustaceans and fish. In captivity, they will eat fish (both whole and pieces), earthworms, squid, shrimp, tadpoles, yolk from green sea turtle eggs, pieces of pig and chicken liver, baby mice and mussels, but refuse to take bird eggs and legs of frog. In captivity adults typically eat once or twice per week, but sometimes enter longer periods where they do not feed. Unusually for a lizard, they can swallow prey while submerged underwater. The only other monitor species reported to do this is Mertens' water monitor. They appear to be able to do this by draining water from their nostrils, similar to turtles.

=== Breeding and life cycle ===
Like their closest relatives, they are oviparous, although little is known about their reproduction. Based on captive observations a pair will mate repeatedly over a period of a few months, with each session lasting for hours. In one case, a single mating lasted 44 hours. They mate in the water. In the wild mating has been seen in February, and a female caught in April was likely gravid. The 2–12 (average 8) oval eggs measure about 3 cm (1.2 in) long and have a leathery white shell. They are deposited on land. In captivity the eggs hatch after about three months at a temperature of 27 °C (81 °F). Adult males are likely territorially aggressive, as a survey of a locality found twice as many females as males, and most of the males (but no females) had various injuries, such as loss of toes or tail, and scarring on the head or neck. In captivity, young up to 6 months old have been kept in groups, and adults have been kept singly, as pairs or a single male with several females; more than one adult male causes problems. The lifespan is unknown, but—despite the very limited knowledge of reptile keeping at the time—an individual that entered captivity as a young adult in the 1960s lived for more than 7.5 years after its capture (growing from 38.2 to 47 cm or 15.0 to 18.5 in in total length), and others have reportedly surpassed a decade in captivity.

== Status and conservation ==
The earless monitor lizard has been rated by the IUCN as endangered (its range covers less than 500 km^{2} or 190 mi^{2}). The species is usually considered very rare, but it is easily overlooked and as recently as 1999 the only published confirmed records were from Sarawak. Confirmation from Kalimantan only appeared later. In some areas locals are unaware of its presence or consider it rare, but in others it may be common. At one site in West Kalimantan, 17 of 21 locals asked were aware of its presence and most of these considered it common. At three other sites in the region the majority asked were aware of its presence, but less than half considered it common. Elsewhere in West Kalimantan, a three-night survey of a 400 m (1,300 ft) long section of a stream, as well as two adjacent streams, located 19 earless monitor lizards, representing an unusually high density for a lizard of this size. Despite this high density in a stream used by locals for washing, fishing and as a source of drinking water, they only reported seeing the species very rarely and some had never seen it. Nevertheless, at present the earless monitor lizard is only known for certain from a relatively small number of sites.

About 100 museum specimens are known and most major natural history museums have one or more in their collection. These were generally collected in the 1960s–1980s or earlier, often during floods when earless monitor lizards were swept along the current and ended up in fishing traps. From the 1960s to the 1990s small numbers entered the pet trade. In 2012 it was featured in a Japanese reptile keepers magazine and in the following years a larger number of individuals entered captivity. From May 2014 to October 2015 at least 95 earless monitor lizards appeared in the trade in Asia (Hong Kong, Indonesia, Japan and Malaysia), Europe (Czech Republic, France, Germany, Netherlands, Russia, Ukraine and the United Kingdom) and the United States. Collecting the species from the wild is illegal; the earless monitor lizard has been protected in Malaysia since 1971, in Brunei since 1978 and in Indonesia since 1980. Penalties range from a fine of US$1,600 and one year's imprisonment (Brunei) to $7,850 and three years' imprisonment (Malaysia), to $8,600 and five years' imprisonment (Indonesia). As a precaution some scientists that have discovered individuals in the wild have refused to provide the exact location, only describing it in very broad terms, citing fears of alerting wildlife traders. In 2015, a smuggler was caught in an Indonesian airport with 8 individuals and in 2016 another was caught in an Indonesian airport with 17 individuals. This trade is supported by the very high price. When first entering the market in Japan, a pair sold for ¥3 million (more than US$25,000). Although the price has since fallen by more than 90% due to increased availability, it remains valuable. Significant declines in price have also been noted elsewhere. Unlike all other monitor species, the earless monitor lizard was not listed on CITES, which would restrict trade at an international level. In 2016 it was proposed that it should be placed on CITES Appendix I, and in 2017 it was afforded a level of protection when placed on Appendix II (wild individuals cannot be exported for commercial purposes).

The first confirmed captive breeding was at a zoo in Japan in 2014. A couple of years later a few European zoos initiated a breeding program; in 2017 it was bred at Schönbrunn Zoo in Austria, and in 2018 it was bred a Prague Zoo in the Czech Republic and Moscow Zoo in Russia. There have been other breeding reports by private keepers and captive bred individuals have been offered for sale, but some of these may not involve genuine cases of captive breeding.

Habitat loss represents another serious threat, as forests in Borneo rapidly are being replaced by oil palm plantations. However, the earless monitor lizard can survive in high densities in areas surrounded by degraded habitats (including oil palm plantations), and rocky streams, possibly its preferred habitat, are relatively unaffected by humans.
