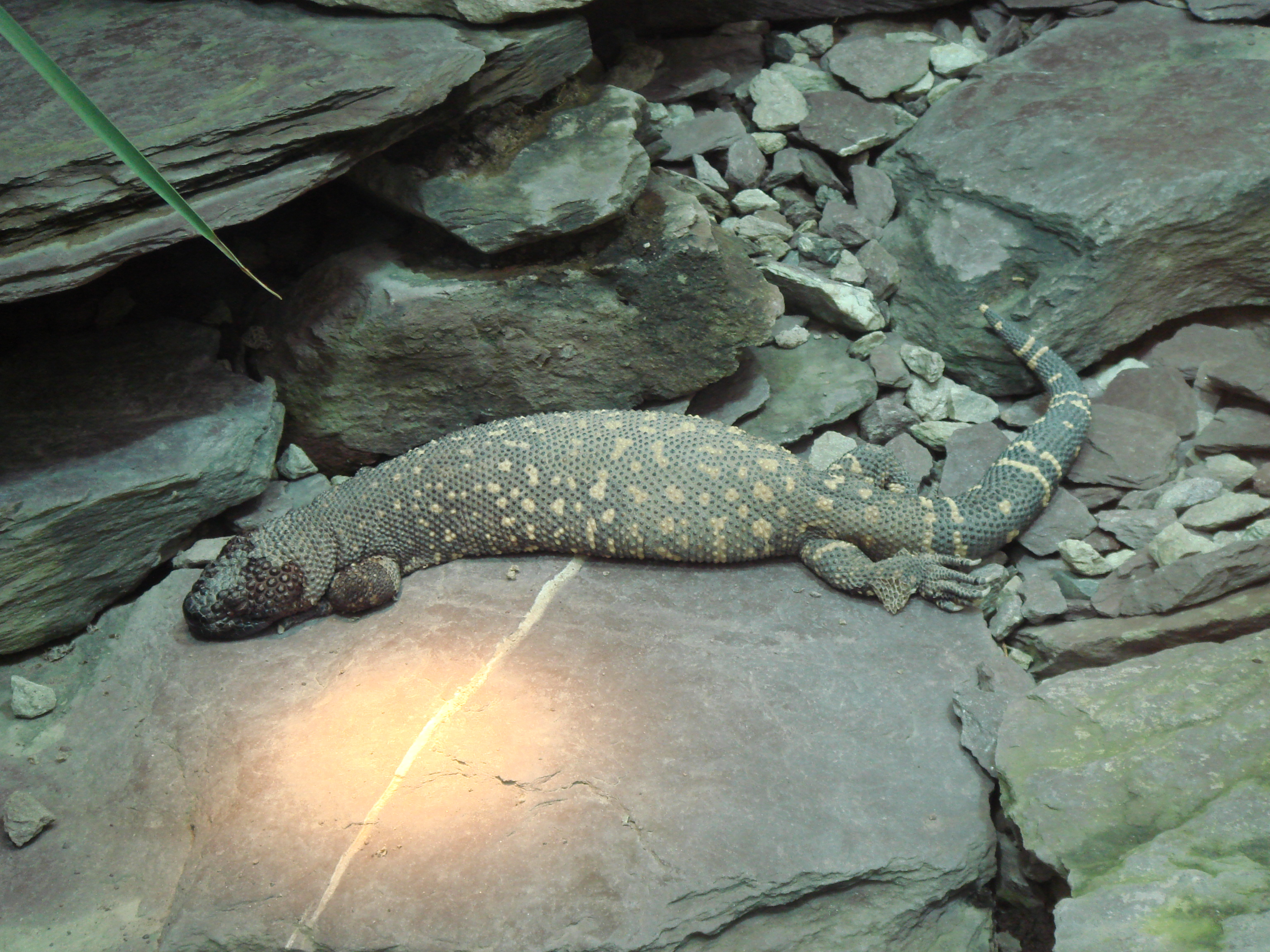
- At Zürich Zoologischer Garten

Conservation status
- Least Concern (IUCN 3.1)
- CITES Appendix II

Scientific classification
- Kingdom: Animalia
- Phylum: Chordata
- Class: Reptilia
- Order: Squamata
- Suborder: Anguimorpha
- Family: Helodermatidae
- Genus: Heloderma
- Species: H. horridum

Binomial name
- Heloderma horridum (Wiegmann, 1829)

Synonyms
- Heloderma hernandesii Wiegmann, 1834; Trachyderma horridum Wiegmann, 1829

= Mexican beaded lizard =

Species of reptile

The Mexican beaded lizard (Heloderma horridum) or beaded lizard is a species of venomous lizard in the family Helodermatidae, one of the two species of venomous beaded lizards found principally in Mexico and southern Guatemala. It and the other members of the same genus, including the Gila monster (Heloderma suspectum), are the only lizards known to have evolved an overt venom delivery system. The Mexican beaded lizard is larger than the Gila monster, with duller coloration, black with yellowish bands. As it is a specialized predator that feeds primarily upon eggs, the primary use of its venom is still a source of debate among scientists. This venom has been found to contain several enzymes useful for manufacturing drugs in the treatment of diabetes, and research on the pharmacological use of its venom is ongoing.

Threatened throughout its range by overcollection and habitat loss, it is a CITES protected species. The Guatemalan beaded lizard (H. charlesbogerti) is one of the rarest lizards in the world, with a wild population of fewer than 200.

== Taxonomy ==
The beaded lizards have one close living relative, the Gila monster (H. suspectum), as well as many extinct relatives in the Helodermatidae, whose genetic history may be traced back to the Cretaceous period. The genus Heloderma has existed since the Miocene Epoch, when H. texana ranged over most of North America. Because the helodermatids have remained relatively unchanged morphologically, they are occasionally regarded as living fossils. Although the beaded lizards appear closely related to the monitor lizards (varanids) of Africa, Asia, and Australia, the wide geographical separation and unique features not found in the varanids indicate the beaded lizards are better placed in a separate family.

The species was first described in 1829 by Arend Wiegmann as Trachyderma horridum, but he renamed it Heloderma horridum six months later. Its generic name Heloderma means "studded skin", from the Ancient Greek words hêlos (ἧλος)—the head of a nail or stud—and dérma (δέρμα), meaning skin. Its specific name, horrĭdum, is the Latin word meaning rough or rude.

== Description ==
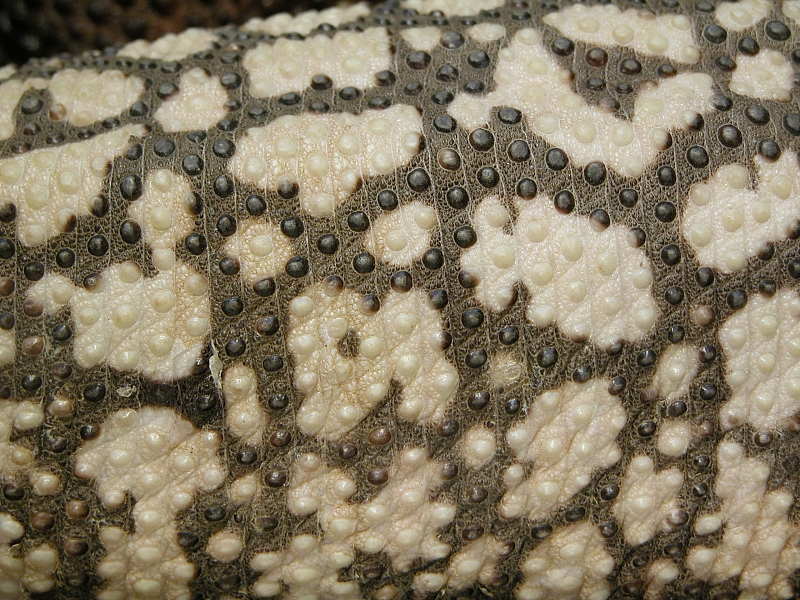
Close-up of a helodermatid's skin, composed of beadlike scales

Adult beaded lizards range from 57 to 91 cm (22 to 36 in) in length. They are substantially larger than the Gila monster, which only reaches lengths of 30 to 56 cm (12 to 22 in). The snout-to-vent length of a beaded lizard averages 33 to 48 cm (13 to 19 in). The average body mass of an adult beaded lizard is 800 g (1.8 lb), about 45% heavier than the average mass of a Gila monster, with large specimens exceeding 2,000 g (4.4 lb). Maximum weight known is 4,000 g (8.8 lb) Although males are slightly larger than females, the beaded lizards are not sexually dimorphic. Both males and females are stocky with broad heads, although the males' heads tend to be broader. The beaded lizards' scales are small, beadlike, and not overlapping. Except for the underside, the majority of its scales are underlaid with bony osteoderms.

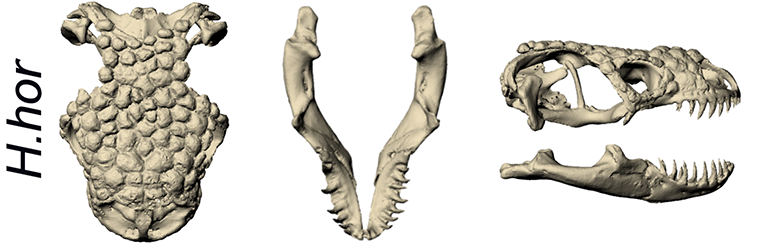
Mexican beaded lizard skull

Their base color is black and marked with varying amounts of yellow spots or bands. The beaded lizards have short tails, which are used to store fat so they can survive during months of estivation. Unlike many other lizards, this tail does not regenerate if broken. Beaded lizards have forked, pink tongues that they use to smell, with the help of a Jacobson's organ; they stick their tongues out to gather scents and touch them to the opening of the organ when the tongue is retracted.

== Habitat and range ==
Beaded lizards are found in the Pacific drainages from southern Sonora to southwestern Guatemala and two Atlantic drainages, from central Chiapas to southeastern Guatemala. Their habitats are primarily in the desert, tropical deciduous forests, and thorn scrub forests, but are found in pine-oak forests, with elevations from sea level to 1500 m. In the wild, the lizards are only active from April to mid-November, spending about an hour per day above the ground.

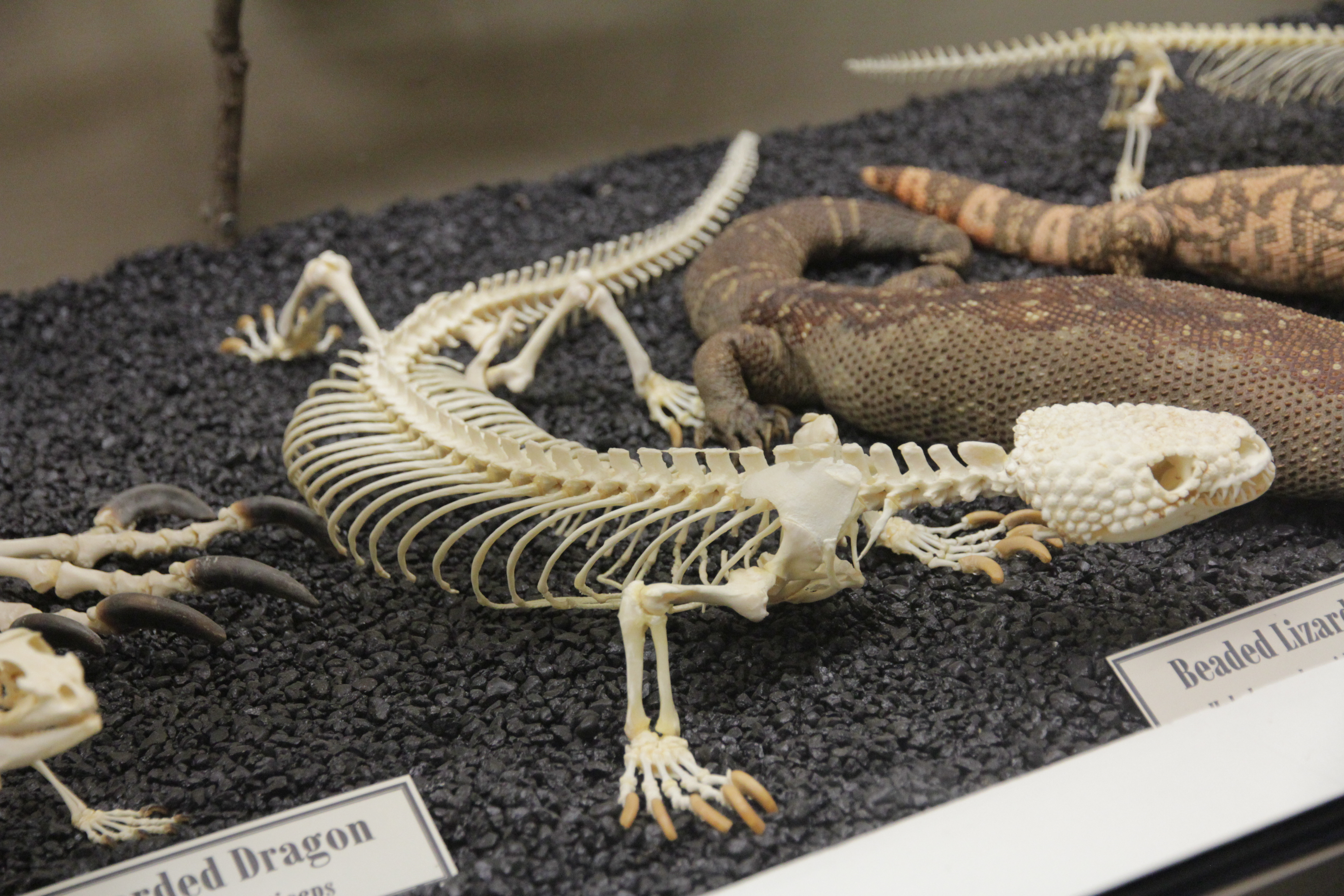
Beaded lizard skeleton (Museum of Osteology)

The Mexican beaded lizard H. horridum is found in Mexico, from Sonora to Oaxaca. The Rio Fuerte beaded lizard (H. exasperatum) is found from southern Sonora to northern Sinaloa. The Chiapan beaded lizard (H. alvarezi) is found in northern Chiapas and the depression of the Río Lagartero in Huehuetenango to northwestern Guatemala. The ranges of these three species overlap, making them sympatric. The Guatemalan beaded lizard (H. charlesbogerti) is the only allopatric one, separated from the nearest population (H. alvarezi) by 250 km of unsuitable habitat. The Guatemalan beaded lizard is the most endangered of the species, if not of all lizards; it is found only in the dry valley of the Río Motagua in northeastern Guatemala; fewer than 200 are believed to exist in the wild.

== Ecology ==
=== Diet ===
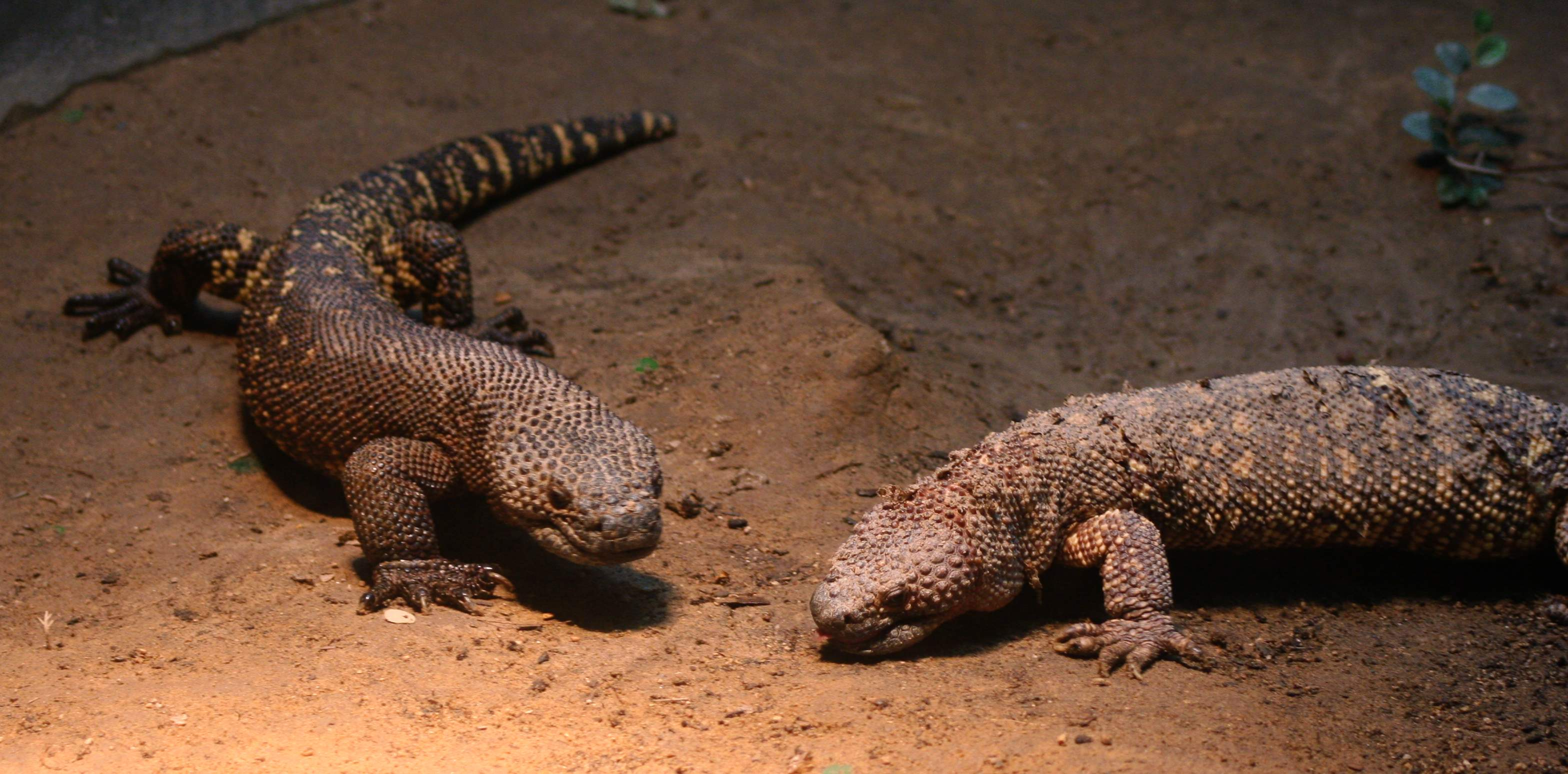
A pair of Mexican beaded lizards at the Buffalo Zoo: The specimen on the right is in the process of shedding.

The beaded lizard is a specialized vertebrate nest predator, feeding primarily on bird and reptile eggs. A semiarboreal species, it is found climbing deciduous trees in search of prey when encountered above ground. It occasionally preys upon small birds, mammals, frogs, lizards, and insects. Steve Angeli and Robert Applegate, noted captive breeders of the beaded lizard, have remarked that captive specimens do best on a diet of small vertebrates such as mice and rats. Confiscated wild-caught specimens can be made to feed by using egg on the prey item.

=== Venom ===
The venom glands of the beaded lizard are modified salivary glands located in the reptile's lower jaw. Each gland has a separate duct leading to the base of its grooved teeth. When biting, the beaded lizard hangs on its victim and chews to get its venomous saliva into the wound. Although its jaw grip is strong, its unsocketed teeth are easily broken off at their bases. The beaded lizard's venom is a weak hemotoxin, and although human deaths are rare, it can cause respiratory failure. It consists of a number of components, including L-amino acid oxidase, hyaluronidase, phospholipase A, serotonin, and highly active kallikreins that release vasoactive kinins. The venom contains no enzymes that significantly affect coagulation. Almost all documented human bites (eight in the past century) have resulted from prodding captive lizards with a finger or bare foot.

While invertebrates are essentially immune to the effects of this venom, effects on vertebrates are more severe and varied. In mammals such as rats, major effects include a rapid reduction in carotid blood flow followed by a marked fall in blood pressure, respiratory irregularities, tachycardia, and other cardiac anomalies, as well as hypothermia, edema, and internal hemorrhage in the gastrointestinal tract, lungs, eyes, liver, and kidneys. In humans, the effects of bites are associated with excruciating pain that may extend well beyond the area bitten and persist up to 24 hours. Other common effects of bites on humans include local edema (swelling), weakness, sweating, and a rapid fall in blood pressure. Beaded lizards are immune to the effects of their own venom.

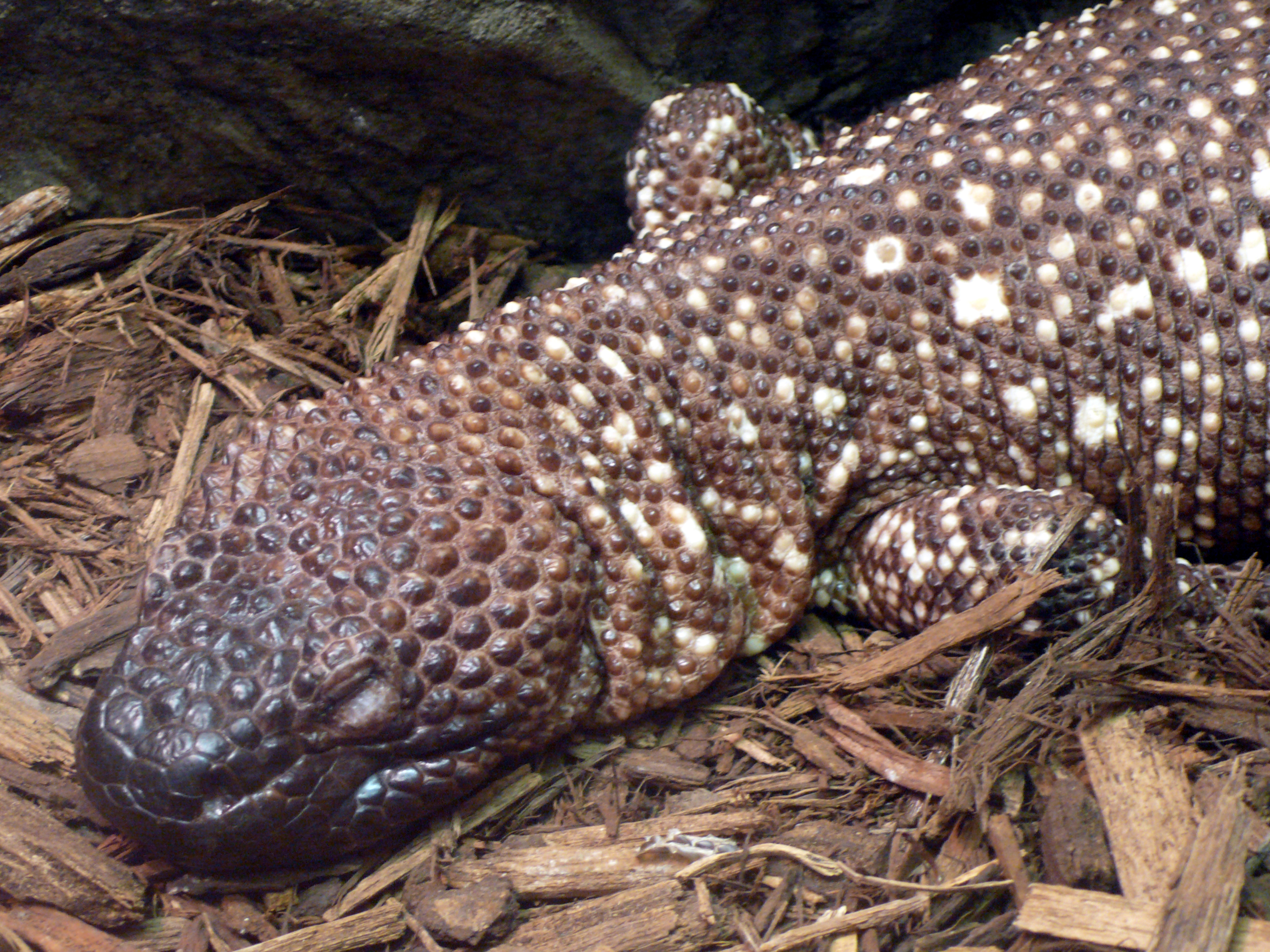
The Mexican beaded lizard's base color is black, with yellow bands or patches.

Some compounds in its venom have been shown to have pharmacological properties relating to the possible treatment of diabetes, Alzheimer's disease, and even HIV. One compound, a hormone named exendin-3, is marketed by Amylin Pharmaceuticals as the drug exenatide. A study in 1996 revealed that it binds to cell receptors in breast cancer cells and may stop the growth of lung cancer cells.

=== Reproduction ===
The beaded lizard becomes sexually mature as early as 3 years, and typically mates during summer months. In captivity, breeding generally follows the same pattern, but successful breeding can occur any month of the year. Males engage in ritual combat that can last several hours; the victor mates with the female. Clutches of two to 30 eggs are generally laid late summer or early fall, hatching the following spring or summer.

Young lizards are seldom seen. They are believed to spend much of their early lives underground, emerging at 2–3 years of age after gaining considerable size.

== Conservation ==
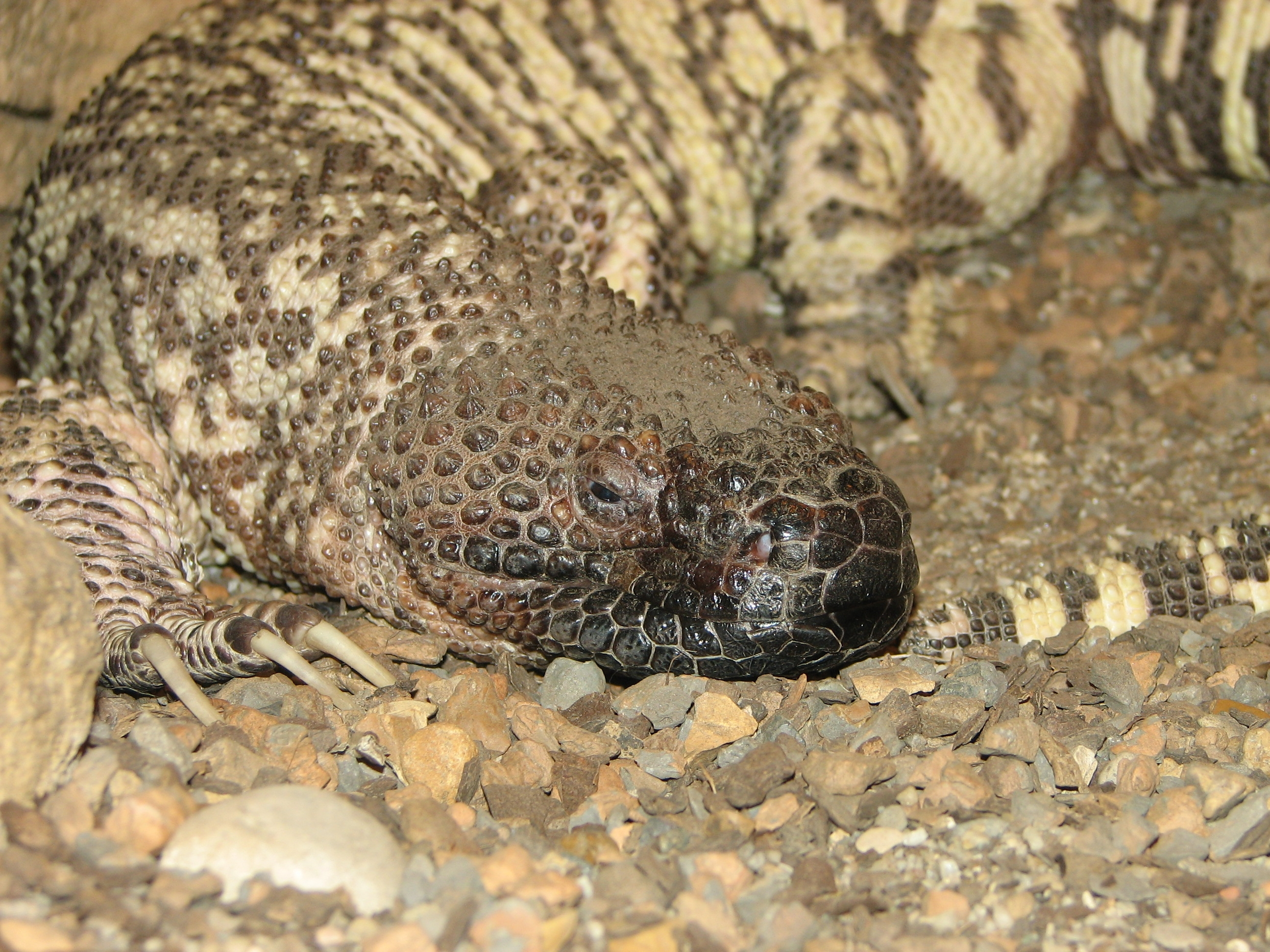
Mexican beaded lizard at the Louisville Zoo, Kentucky

The beaded lizard is surrounded by myth and superstition in much of its native range. It is incorrectly believed, for example, to be more venomous than a rattlesnake, can cause lightning strikes with its tail, or make a pregnant woman miscarry by merely looking at her. As a result of this superstition, locals often kill the lizard on sight.

The beaded lizard is protected by Mexican law under the category A (Threatened), and it dwells within the range of several protected areas. In Guatemala, it is protected by national legislation, and part of its range is within protected areas. It is listed on Appendix II of CITES.

It is estimated that fewer than 200 lizards remain in the dry forest habitat of the Motagua Valley, and this species of beaded lizard (H. charlesbogerti) was facing extinction due to local extermination and loss of habitat for agricultural purposes. A conservation effort has been launched known as Project Heloderma to preserve the semiarid habitat of the Motagua Valley by the Nature Conservancy and partners such as ZOOTROPIC, CONAP, the International Reptile Conservation Foundation, Lincoln Park Zoo, Zoo Atlanta, and the San Diego Zoo. This effort has been successful in getting the Guatemalan government to list the beaded lizard under the Convention on International Trade in Endangered Species as an Appendix I animal, making it illegal to export the species.

== External ==
- IRCF's Guatemalan Beaded Lizard Conservation Project
- Mexican Beaded Lizard at the LA Zoo
- Mexican Beaded Lizard at the Saint Louis Zoo
- Protecting Guatemalan beaded lizards: Conservation Heloderma
