= Mathematics and Science Academy UTB =

Coordinates: 25.893773°N 97.486521°W

The Mathematics and Science Academy (MSA), a high school located in Brownsville & Edinburg, Texas, was established by the 79th Texas Legislature in May 2005. It was designed as a commuter program at the University of Texas at Brownsville and Texas Southmost College (UTB) for high school-aged students who are gifted in mathematics and science. Rather than complete their final two years of traditional high school at other public institutions, students of the Math and Science Academy are required to take classes taught by UTB/TSC faculty with regular UTB students, but are provided with more supervision and guidance than traditional college students. The students are not charged tuition, book fees, nor any other fees typically charged by the university, but transportation and food are not provided for students. Graduating from the Mathematics and Science Academy program grants you a Distinguished high school diploma as well as an Associates of Arts degree, if you complete the necessary college hours. MSA is only the second high school program of its kind; the University of North Texas hosts a similar program, the Texas Academy of Mathematics and Science.

== History ==
The Inaugural Class began its courses in 2007, averaging 18 college hours per semester per student. They were engaged in actual college lectures with normal university students, despite being high school students themselves. Five students of the inaugural class were not able to meet to requirements to stay in Mathematics and Science Academy and were instead forced to go back to their respective high schools. The following year, the second year class of MSA students were admitted. The group of forty students, from all around the Rio Grande Valley, participated in a variety of difficult college classes as well, and most were able to score a GPA of 3.5 or higher on a 4.0 scale. The Mathematics and Science Academy's third year of students graduated in May 2011, with several of them having gained acceptance to post-secondary schools such as Dartmouth College, the Massachusetts Institute of Technology, Columbia University, Cornell University, Bowdoin College, the University of Texas, and other such prestigious schools. The school aims to remain small so as to be able to provide individualized attention to each student, though it has experienced growth throughout the past several years.

== Requirements ==
In order to apply for a slot in the MSA, you must meet the following requirements:

- Applicants must be residents of Texas.
- The Scholastic Assessment Test (SAT I) must be taken in the sophomore year. The score should be competitive with those of Texas college-bound high school seniors planning to major in math, science, or engineering (1070 composite score for Math and Reading with a minimum of 500 in both areas).
- Transcripts of all school work from the ninth through tenth grades, showing excellent grades (more A's than B's), preferably in Honors, GT, and AP courses.
- Completion of Algebra I, Algebra II, and Geometry prior to academy entry.
- Evidence of interest in mathematics, science, and/or engineering as a career. This would include mathematics competitions, science fairs, etc.
- A completed application, including a student essay and recommendations from a school administrator, mathematics, science, and English teachers.
- Have a successful on-campus interview.

=== Graduation Requirements ===
Students must complete 60 - 68 required semester credit hours, with a cumulative grade point average of 3.0 (B average). A wide range of elective course options are available to students. Graduates receive an advanced high school diploma, including college credits. The MSA academic advisers provide invaluable assistance with college applications and scholarship procurement. Seminar presentations covering college essay composition and other application essentials are offered.

== Student life ==
Some Academy organizations offer numerous leadership and service opportunities, from yearbook and Student Council, to musical and theatrical groups, volunteer organizations, and intramural athletics. The University sponsors dances, game and activity nights, movies, plays, and recreation, with the Bougainvillea Ball an annual highlight, all available to Math and Science Academy students. Students are at liberty to participate in any of the UTB sponsored organizations and events, and are permitted usage of any and all facilities upon request.

=== Student organizations ===
A wide variety of school organizations exist within the Math and Science Academy, including notably the Chess Club, National Honor Society, Fitness Club, Book Club, Global Culture Club and many others, with more being added each year by subsequent classes of students and others becoming inactive.

=== National Honor Society ===
Like many other high schools, the Mathematics and Science Academy does have a National Honor Society chapter. Many students are inducted into the National Honor Society their Senior year at the Academy, and most choose to actively participate in many of the volunteer opportunities offered. Typically holding monthly meetings, the National Honor Society of MSA has been involved in countless activities, from the Gladys Porter Zoo's annual Boo at the Zoo event, to beach cleanups at South Padre Island, and even promoting the use of reusable bags during Martin Luther King day.

=== Chess Club ===
President Diego Leal started the MSA Chess Club in late 2008. The first chess team usually met several times a week to practice tactics and strategies. Daniel Hung (FIDE 2100+) was, at the time, the team's chess coach. In the 2009 Scholastic State Tournament in Texas, the first official MSA trophy was won for 8th place. Recently, the team claimed 2nd place in Texas at the 2009 State Championship that occurred in late November.

=== Staff ===
The Math and Science Academy Staff consists of a group of several adults, that help coordinate student events, promote scholarly behavior, and push students year after year to work hard.
Mr. Alias Ortega - Principal,
Mrs. Jeannette Marroquin - Counselor,
Mrs. Brenda Valero - Secretary.
Notably, the school does hire a few Senior-year students to help manage the day-to-day work at the Math and Science Academy, as well as several tutors to help adjust the first-year students into the fast-paced environment at the school.
