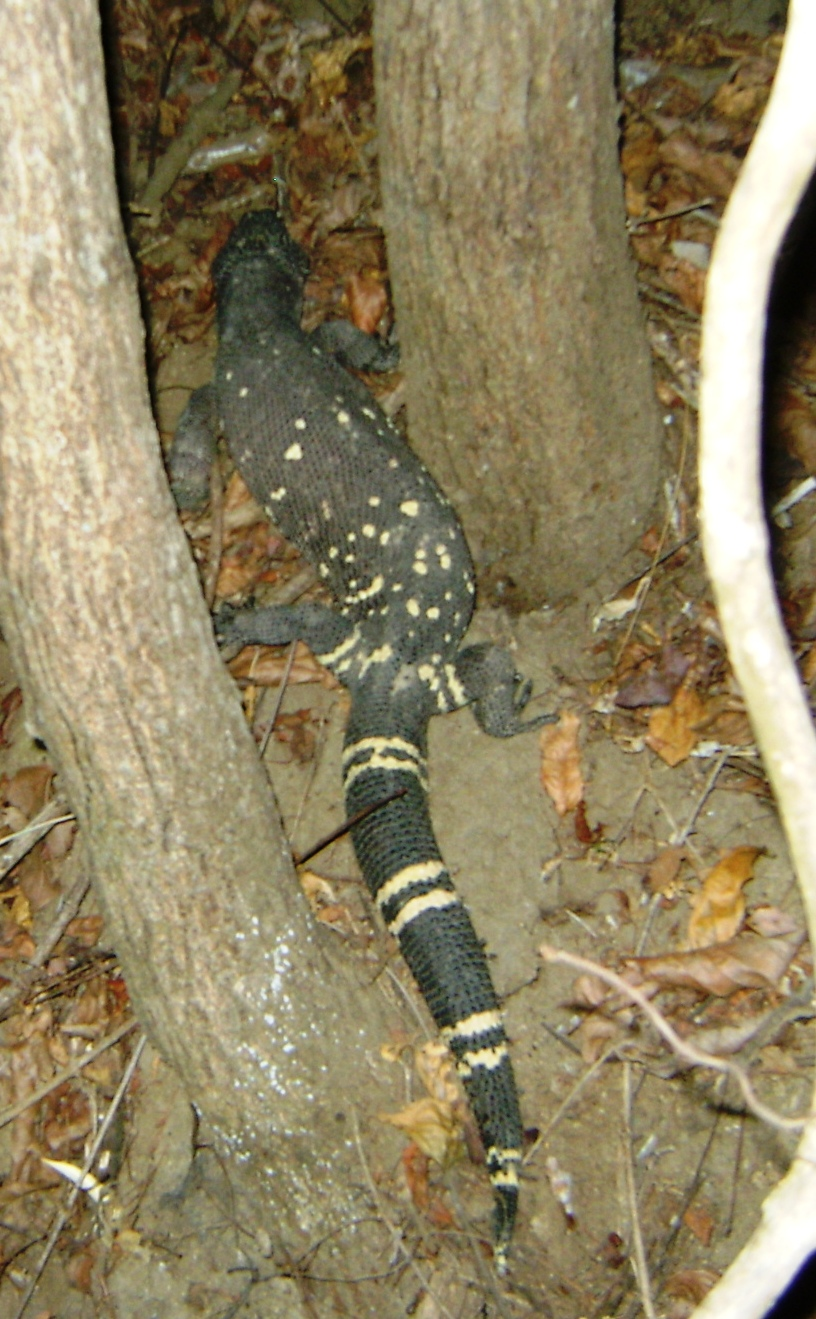

Conservation status
- Endangered (IUCN 3.1)
- CITES Appendix I

Scientific classification
- Kingdom: Animalia
- Phylum: Chordata
- Class: Reptilia
- Order: Squamata
- Suborder: Anguimorpha
- Family: Helodermatidae
- Genus: Heloderma
- Species: H. charlesbogerti

Binomial name
- Heloderma charlesbogerti Campbell & Vannini, 1988

Synonyms
- Heloderma horridum charlesbogerti Campbell & Vannini, 1988; Heloderma charlesbogerti — Reiserer, Schuett & Beck, 2013

= Heloderma charlesbogerti =

Guatemalan beaded lizard

Species of reptile

Heloderma charlesbogerti, commonly called the Guatemalan beaded lizard or the Motagua Valley beaded lizard, is a highly endangered species of beaded lizard, a venomous lizard in the family Helodermatidae. The species is endemic to the dry forests of the Motagua Valley in southeastern Guatemala, an ecoregion known as the Motagua Valley thornscrub. It is the only allopatric beaded lizard species, separated from the nearest population (H. alvarezi) by 250 km (160 mi) of unsuitable habitat. The Guatemalan beaded lizard is the rarest and most endangered species of beaded lizard, and fewer than 200 individuals of this animal are believed to exist in the wild, making it one of the most endangered lizards in the world. In 2007, it was transferred from Appendix II to Appendix I of CITES due to its critical conservation status.

== Taxonomy ==
The Guatemalan beaded lizard belongs to the family Helodermatidae, which forms part of a clade of reptiles with toxin-secreting glands. This species differs from other Heloderma species in coloration and size, being the smallest one. Home ranges and behavior of these lizards were investigated using radiotelemetry at the dry forests of Zacapa, Guatemala. The average home range for individuals was found to be 130 ha.

This species was first discovered in 1984 by an agricultural laborer named D. Vasquez in Guatemala's Motagua Valley.

== Etymology ==
The generic name, Heloderma, means "studded skin", from the Ancient Greek words hêlos (ηλος), meaning "the head of a nail or stud", and derma (δερμα), meaning "skin".

The specific name, charlesbogerti, honors US herpetologist Charles Mitchill Bogert.

== Diet ==
H. charlesbogerti dwells in arroyos characterized by high densities of bird nests of doves and parakeets, whose eggs form the primary component of its diet. These birds nest closer to the ground in these arroyos in trees with branches thick enough to support the weight of this heavy-bodied lizard. It is also known to prey upon insects, such as beetles and crickets. The eggs of the Guatemalan spiny-tailed iguana (Ctenosaura palearis), an endangered species endemic to the same region, are an important food source for the Guatemalan beaded lizard, thereby possibly linking the status of the two.
