= Gladys Porter Zoo =

Zoo in Brownsville, Texas, United States

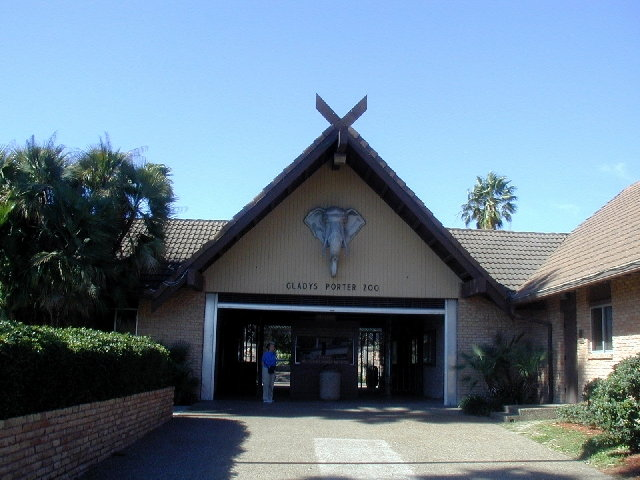
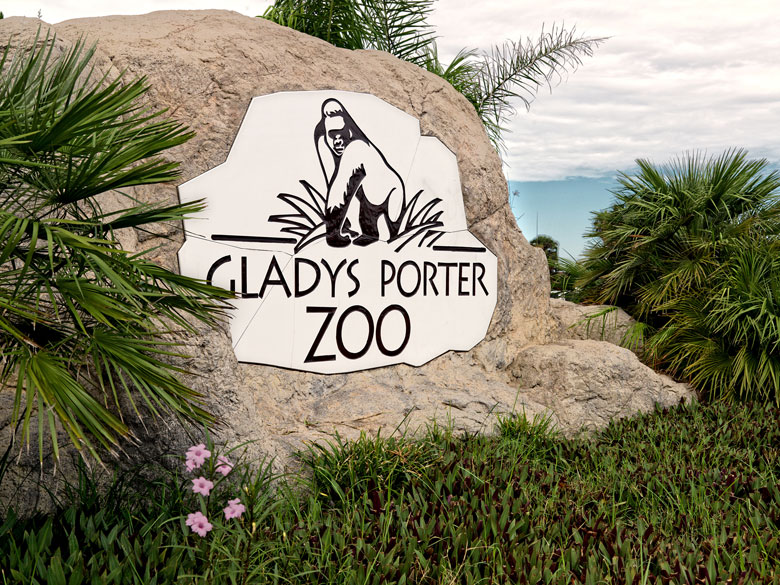
- Front entrance on Ringgold St. The Gladys Porter Zoo Sign
- Interactive map of Gladys Porter Zoo
- 25.9123°N 97.4962°W
- Date opened: 3 September 1971
- Location: Brownsville, Texas, USA
- Land area: 31 acres (13 ha)
- No. of animals: 1600
- No. of species: 400
- Annual visitors: 424,000+
- Memberships: AZA
- Website: gladysporterzoo.org

Gladys Porter Zoo is a zoological and botanical park located in Brownsville, Texas, United States. The zoo officially opened on September 3, 1971, and currently averages over 424,000 visitors annually. Situated on 31 acres (13 ha), the zoo houses about 400 animal species (including 47 endangered species) and over 250 tropical and neo-tropical species and subspecies. It is the first zoo to have successfully bred the endangered Jentink's duiker (although none are currently in captivity in the US). It is also the birthplace of Harambe, the gorilla.

The zoo is named after Gladys Porter, the daughter of Earl C. Sams, former president of J. C. Penney. Porter, a wildlife enthusiast, helped to plan and stock the zoo, which was entirely funded by the Earl C. Sams Foundation. After its opening, the zoo was given to the city of Brownsville.

== History ==
Giraffe at the zoo.

The zoo was planned, built, stocked, and given by the Earl C. Sams Foundation to the City of Brownsville. It opened on 3 September 1971. The first addition to its exhibits was the Herpetarium, which opened in April 1973. The zoo has been the single largest recipient from the foundation funds established by Sams.

The zoo published the first issue of its Zoo News (its official newsletter and now a quarterly publication) in January 1972. The naturalistic exhibits at the zoo won the 1979 Texas Building Branch of Associated General Contractors Outstanding Construction Award.

In 1978, the zoo launched its summer study programs on a trial basis with classes for children in grades 1 through 12. Although only four classes were taught that summer, the program has expanded over the years and now includes classes in the spring and fall as well as summer. The zoo also received accreditation from the Association of Zoos and Aquariums (AZA) in 1978.

In subsequent years, Orangutan Island was enlarged, the Herpetarium was expanded with a new aquatic wing, and many other exhibits as well as facilities such as the gift shop, offices, and concession stands were remodeled or added. Most of these projects were made possible by the zoo's annual Zoofari fundraisers.

In 1986, the zoo created an endowment fund with the help of matching grants from the Earl C. Sams (dollar for dollar up to $2 million) and the Lightner Sams Foundation (dollar for dollar up to $1 million). Income from this permanent endowment now ensures that the zoo can maintain and improve itself.

The Australian exhibit opened in February 1988 — the largest addition to the zoo since its opening. The Education department was also expanded in 1989 and a walk-through aviary (Zack's Aerie, made possible by private donations) was also opened.

Animals and Exhibits

Africa

- Addax
- African lion
- African wild dog
- Angolan black-and-white colobus
- Black-and-white ruffed lemur
- Blue crane
- Bongo
- Bontebok
- Bushbuck
- Chimpanzee
- Common warthog
- Dama gazelle
- Dromedary camel
- Grant’s zebra
- Gray-crowned crane
- Kori bustard
- Kudu
- Mandrill
- Pygmy hippo
- Radiated tortoise
- Red ruffed lemur
- Red-flanked duiker
- Reticulated giraffe
- Ring-tailed lemur
- Serval
- Southern ground-hornbill
- Southern white rhinoceros
- Western lowland gorilla
- Yellow-backed duiker

Asia-Australia

- Arabian oryx
- Black swan
- Edward’s pheasant
- Gaur
- Komodo dragon
- Magpie goose
- Müller’s gibbon
- Nilgai
- Philippine crocodile
- Pileated gibbon
- Rhinoceros hornbill
- Saltwater crocodile
- Siamang
- Southern cassowary
- Sumatran orangutan
- Tawny frogmouth
- Tiger

Asia-Australia (Indoor Exhibits)

- Carpet python
- Eastern blue-tongued skink
- Matschie’s tree kangaroo
- Northern greater galago (*)
- Northern treeshrew
- Seba’s short-tailed bat (**)
- Short-beaked echidna
- Sugar glider
- Virginia opossum (**)
- Western gray kangaroo
- Yellow monitor

(*)=actually an African species (**)=actually an American species

Herpetarium

- Alligator snapping turtle
- American alligator
- Anegada rock iguana
- Arabian sand boa
- Asian giant toad
- Axolotl
- Black-spotted newt
- Blue-spotted tree monitor
- Brazilian salmon-pink bird-eating tarantula
- Broad-banded copperhead
- Brown recluse spider
- Brown widow
- Central American bushmaster
- Chiapan beaded lizard
- Common knob-tailed gecko
- Common leopard gecko
- Cuvier’s dwarf caiman
- Desert hairy scorpion
- Gaboon viper
- Giant African bullfrog
- Giant cave cockroach
- Giant plated lizard
- Giant vinegaroon
- Gray-banded kingsnake
- Gray’s monitor
- Green iguana
- Green tree python
- Green tree skink
- King cobra
- Madagascar hissing cockroach
- Malaysian blood python
- Mandarin ratsnake
- Mangshan pit viper
- Mexican hognose snake
- Mexican redknee tarantula
- Mottled rock rattlesnake
- Narrow-breasted snake-necked turtle
- Narrow-bridged musk turtle
- Neotropical ratsnake
- Northern caiman lizard
- Prehensile tailed skink
- Red-eyed crocodile skink
- Reticulated python
- Rhinoceros rat snake
- Ridge-tailed monitor
- Rio Fuerte beaded lizard
- Shingleback lizard
- Slender glass lizard
- Smoky jungle frog
- Southern black widow
- Southern house spider
- Southwestern speckled rattlesnake
- Sri Lankan pit viper
- Striped bark scorpion
- Tamaulipan milksnake
- Tamaulipan rock rattlesnake
- Taylor’s cantil
- Texas brown tarantula
- Texas coral snake
- Texas indigo snake
- Thai bamboo rat snake
- Tiger rattlesnake
- Trans-Pecos rat snake
- Western diamondback rattlesnake
- Western green mamba

Russell Aquatic Ecology Centre

- Alligator gar
- Atlantic needlefish
- Atlantic sergeant major
- Atlantic spadefish
- Atlantic stingray
- Atlantic tripletail
- Axolotl
- Bighead searobin
- Black drum
- Caribbean ocean surgeonfish
- Common snook
- Cownose ray
- Diamondback terrapin
- Flag-fin mojarra
- Florida pompano
- Giant Atlantic murex
- Giant hermit crab
- Gulf killifish
- Gulf toadfish
- Hardhead catfish
- Island apple snail
- Koi
- Lined seahorse
- Lionfish
- Mangrove snapper
- Northern brown shrimp
- Northern white shrimp
- Nurse shark
- Peppermint shrimp
- Pinfish
- Red drum
- Red eared slider turtle
- Sheepshead
- Southern marginalis moon jellyfish
- Southern stingray
- Spanish hogfish
- Spotted gar
- Striped mullet
- Texas cichlid
- Thin-stripe hermit crab
- White mullet

Small World

- Brazilian porcupine
- Cairo spiny mouse
- Cape porcupine
- Cotton-headed tamarin
- Eastern screech-owl
- Golden-handed tamarin
- Hoffmann’s two-toed sloth
- Mantled howler monkey
- Meerkat
- Mongolian gerbil
- Screaming hairy armadillo
- White-faced saki

Small World Petting Zoo

- Domestic ferret
- Domestic goat
- Domestic pig
- Domestic rabbit

South Texas Butterfly Garden

- Banded orange heliconian
- Eastern giant swallowtail
- Gulf fritillary
- Julia heliconian
- Monarch butterfly
- Painted lady
- Queen butterfly
- Zebra longwing

South Texas Discovery Centre

- Bullsnake
- Cane toad
- Desert millipede
- Giant desert centipede
- Great Plains skink
- Gulf coast toad
- Striped bark scorpion
- Tiger salamander

Tropical America

- Bald eagle
- Black spider monkey
- Blue-and-yellow macaw
- Capybara
- Caribbean flamingo
- Chilean flamingo
- Crested caracara
- Cuban crocodile
- Darwin Volcano giant tortoise
- Great curassow
- King vulture
- Mexican spider monkey
- Military macaw
- Orinoco crocodile
- Sandhill crane
- Tufted capuchin

Tropical Free Flight Aviary

- Black-throated magpie-jay
- Blue-bellied roller
- Chiloe wigeon
- Golden pheasant
- Plain chachalaca
- Red-capped cardinal
- Ringed teal
- Roseate spoonbill
- Scarlet ibis
- Scarlet macaw
- Trumpeter hornbill
- Turquoise-browed motmot
- Violet turaco

Un-Themed General Zoo Area American Animals

- American black bear
- Golden conure
- Grand Cayman blue iguana
- Great curassow
- North American river otter
- Peruvian thick-knee
- Red-and-green macaw
- Spectacled bear
- Yellow-headed parrot
