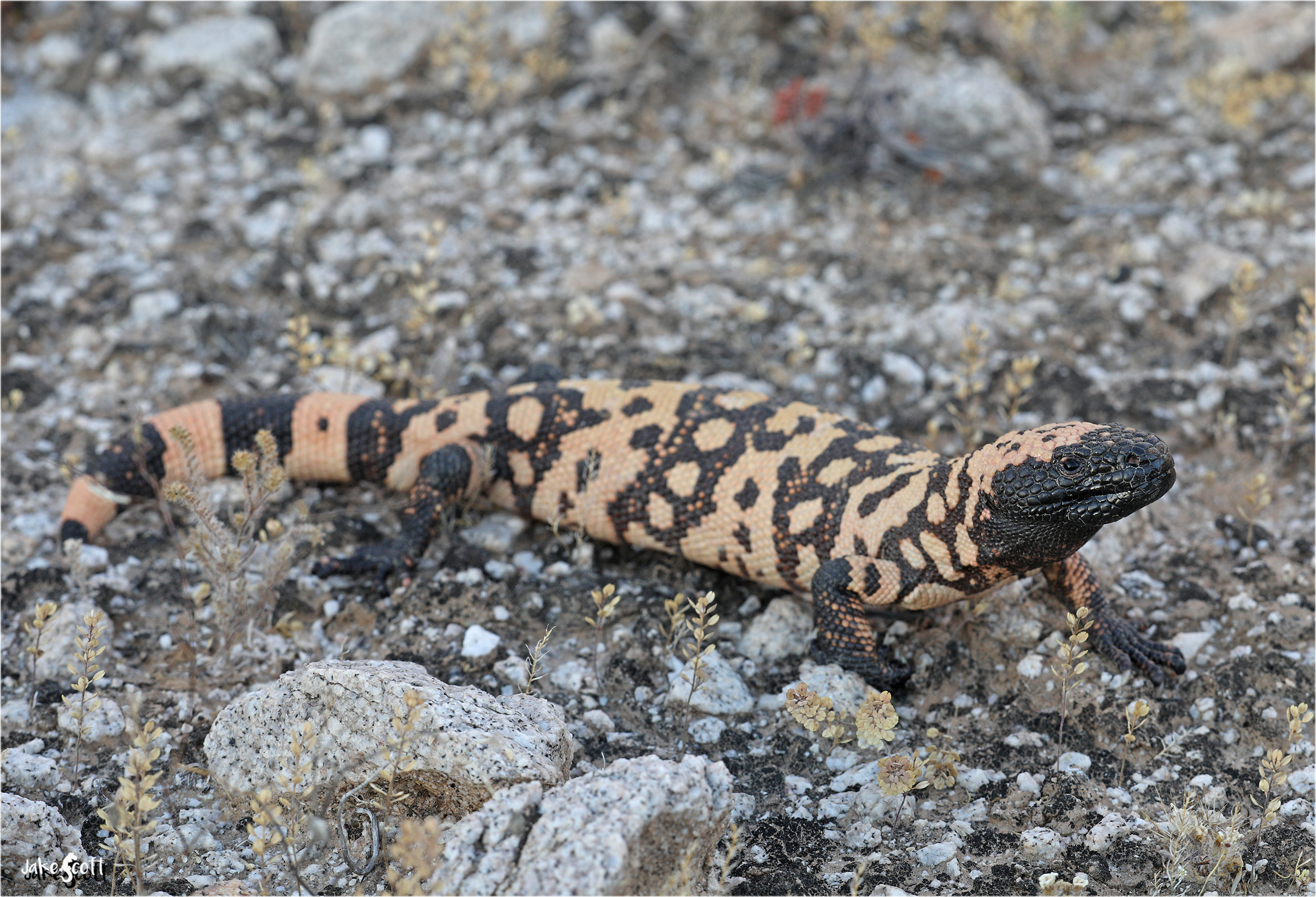
- Gila monster, Heloderma suspectum

Scientific classification
- Kingdom: Animalia
- Phylum: Chordata
- Class: Reptilia
- Order: Squamata
- Suborder: Anguimorpha
- Infraorder: Neoanguimorpha
- Clade: Monstersauria
- Family: Helodermatidae
- Genus: Heloderma; Wiegmann, 1829

Type species
- Heloderma horridum Wiegmann, 1829

Species
- Heloderma suspectum; Heloderma horridum; Heloderma exasperatum; Heloderma charlesbogerti; Heloderma alvarezi; Heloderma texana†

= Heloderma =

Heloderma Temporal range: Early Miocene to Recent

Genus of reptiles

Heloderma is a genus of toxicoferan lizards that contains five species, all of which are venomous. It is the only extant genus of the family Helodermatidae.

== Description ==
Species in Heloderma are stout-bodied lizards with bead-like osteoderms distributed in a non-overlapping pattern on most of their body. Osteoderms are absent from their ventral scales. Heloderma lizards have wide heads with powerful jaws and fixed, immobile eyes. Their tails are used as fat-storage organs. Most species are dark in color, with yellowish or pinkish markings.

== Venom ==
The venom glands of Heloderma are located at the end of the lower jaws, unlike snakes' venom glands, which are located behind the eyes. Also, unlike snakes, the Gila monster and beaded lizards lack the musculature to inject venom immediately by high pressure mechanism. They have to chew the venom into the flesh of a victim. Heloderma venom is used only in defense. Venom glands are believed to have evolved early in the lineage leading to the modern helodermatids, as their presence is indicated even in the 65-million-year-old fossil genus Paraderma. In general, adult helodermatids have 15 to 20 mg of venom, while the lethal dose for humans is 5 to 8 mg of dried venom.

Venom production among lizards was long thought to be unique to this genus, but researchers have identified several other lizards that produce some venom, all placed in the clade Toxicofera along with many non-venomous species. The clade comprises 13 families of lizards and all families of snakes. Humans rarely receive bites from Heloderma species, and envenomation usually has mild effects, but a few severe or even life-threatening cases have been reported. Antivenom is unavailable, but symptoms can be treated.

== Diet ==
Helodermatids are carnivorous, preying on rodents and other small mammals, and eating the eggs of birds and reptiles.

== Reproduction ==
All species of Heloderma are oviparous. The Gila monster typically lays four to six eggs. The beaded lizards up to about 18 eggs. Eggs and hatchlings are similarly sized between species.

== Taxonomy ==
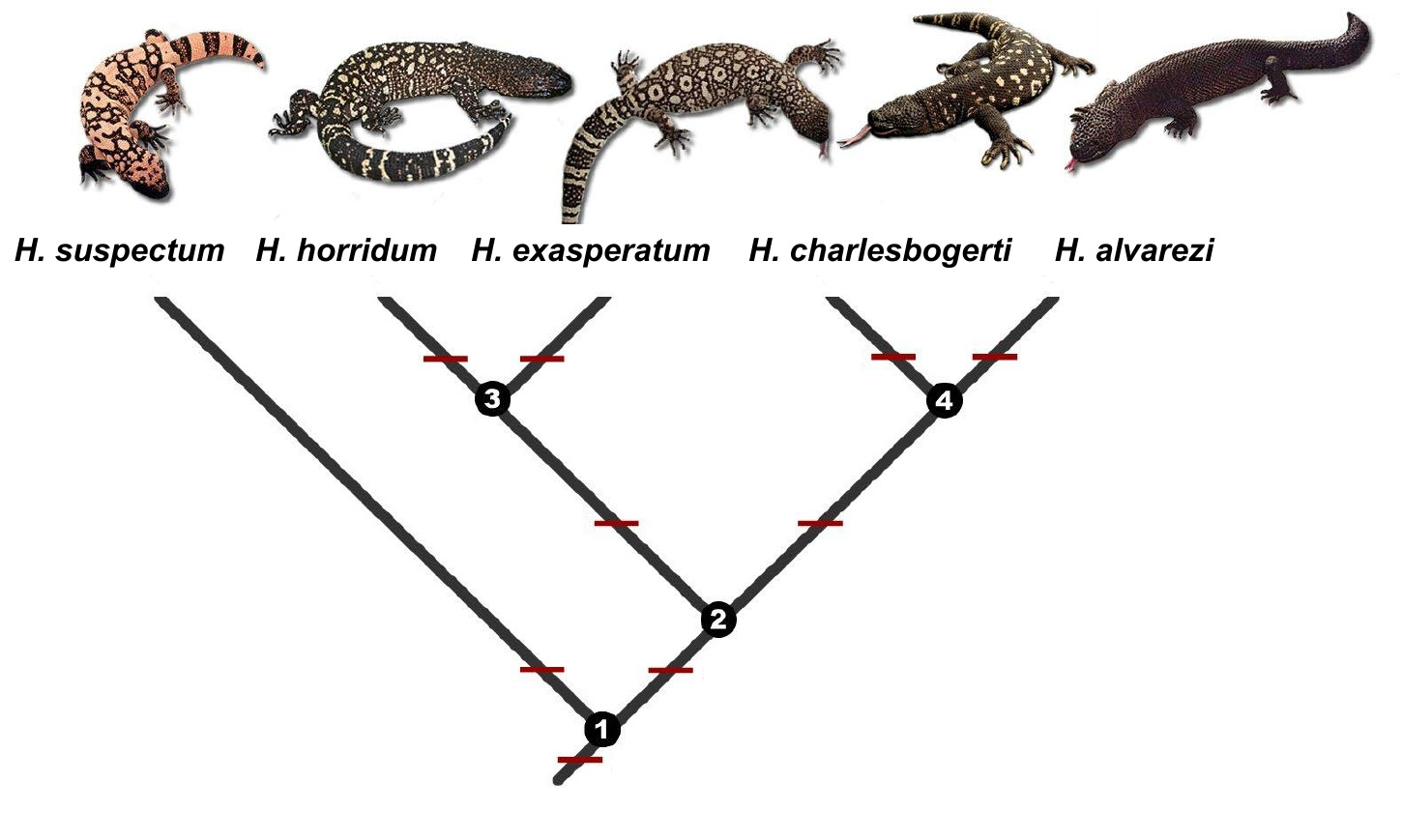
Cladogram of the Heloderma species Explanation of the numbers: 1 / late Eocene (about 35 million years); 2 / late Miocene (about 10 million years); 3 / Pliocene (about 4.4 million years); 4 / Pliocene (about 3 million years)

Family Helodermatidae

Historically, only two extant Heloderma species were recognized: the Gila monster (H. suspectum) and the beaded lizard (H. horridum). The latter was further divided into four subspecies, but all four were elevated to full species in 2013.

Image	Species	Taxon author	Common name	Geographic range
	H. alvarezi	Bogert and Martin del Campo, 1956	Chiapan beaded lizard	Mexico: northern Chiapas to extreme northwestern Guatemala
	H. charlesbogerti	Campbell and Vannini, 1988	Guatemalan beaded lizard	Guatemala: the Motagua Valley
	H. exasperatum	Bogert and Martin del Campo, 1956	Rio Fuerte beaded lizard	Mexico: Rio Fuerte, Rio Mayo, southern Sonora, northern Sinaloa, western Chihuahua and the Sierra Madre Occidental
	H. horridum	Wiegmann, 1829	Mexican beaded lizard	Mexico: southern Sinaloa to Oaxaca
	H. suspectum	Cope, 1869	Gila monster	Southwest United States, Sonora

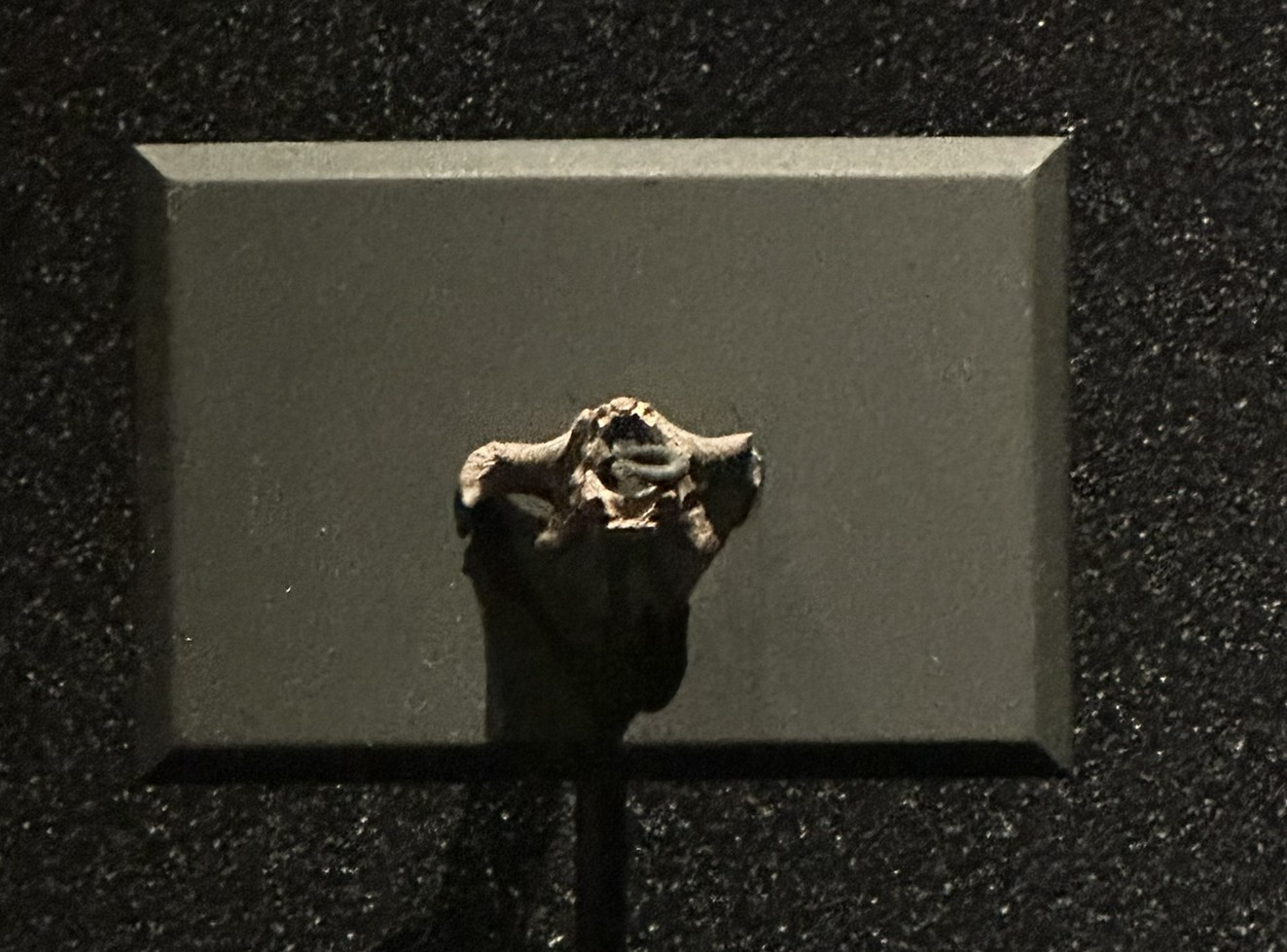
A partial Heloderma skull from the Miocene of Florida (FLMNH). These lizards are no longer found in the region.

Members of the genus Heloderma have many extinct relatives in the Helodermatidae, whose evolutionary history may be traced back to the Cretaceous period, such as Estesia. The genus Heloderma has existed since the Miocene, when H. texana lived, and fragments of osteoderms from the Gila monster have been found in late Pleistocene (8,000-10,000 years ago) deposits near Las Vegas, Nevada. Because the helodermatids have remained relatively unchanged morphologically, they are occasionally regarded as living fossils. Although the beaded lizards and the Gila monster appear closely related to the monitor lizards (varanids) of Africa, Asia, and Australia, the wide geographical separation and unique features not found in the varanids indicate they are better placed in a separate family.

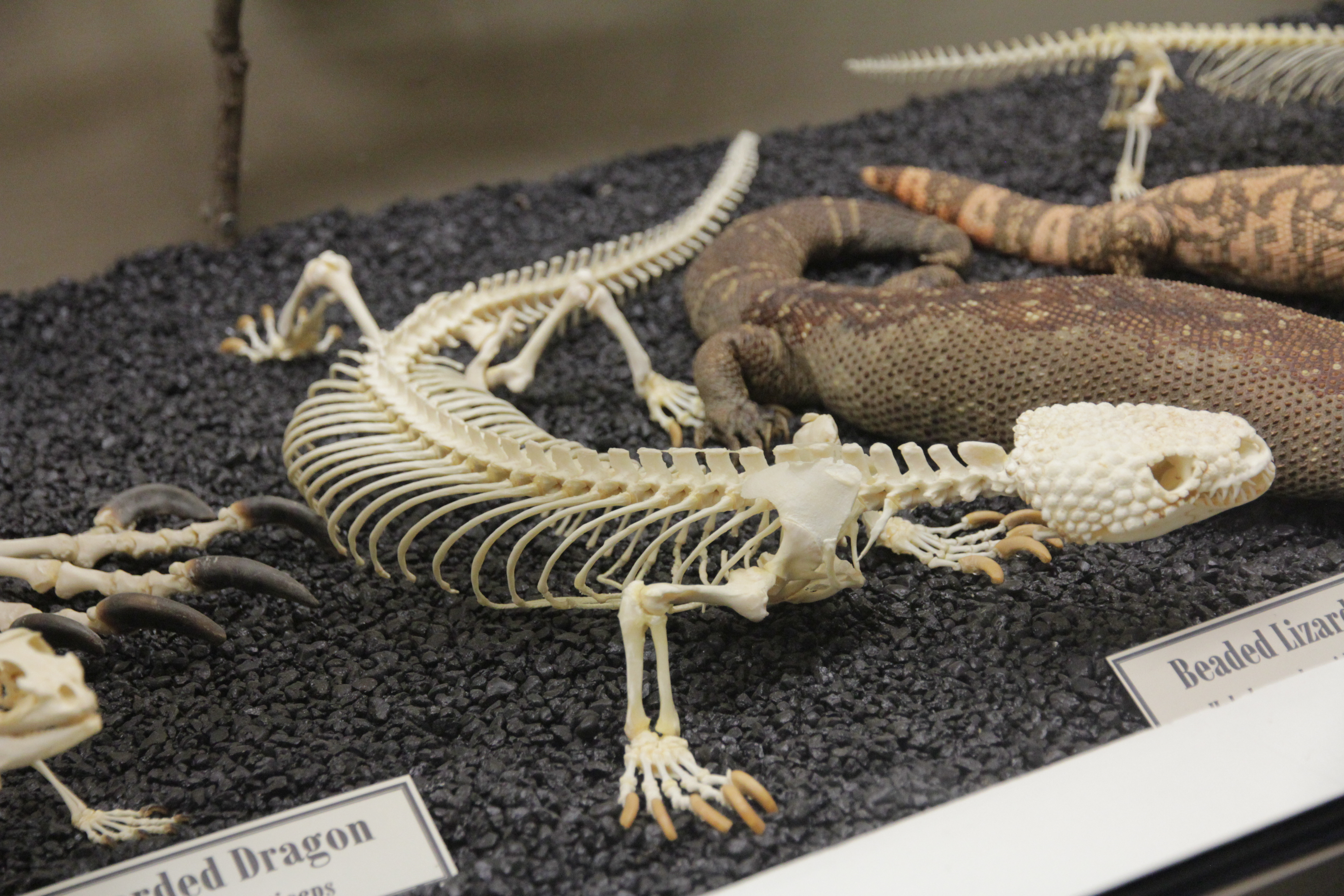
Mexican beaded lizard skeleton (Museum of Osteology)

The type species is Heloderma horridum, which was first described in 1829 by Arend Wiegmann. Although he originally assigned it the generic name Trachyderma, he changed it to Heloderma six months later, which means "studded skin", from the Ancient Greek words hêlos (ηλος)—the head of a nail or stud—and derma (δερμα), meaning skin.

Conrad, 2008 and Estes et al., 1988 (using morphological data) place the Helodermatidae within Varanoidea along with Lanthanotus borneensis and Varanus. However, Estes et al., 1988 understood the Helodermatidae as having split earlier from Lanthanotus and Varanus, whereas Conrad, 2008 groups them at the same branch point.

In contrast, molecular studies have identified Heloderma as being within the Anguioidea along with Anguidae and Xenosauridae, but specifically sister to Anguidae.

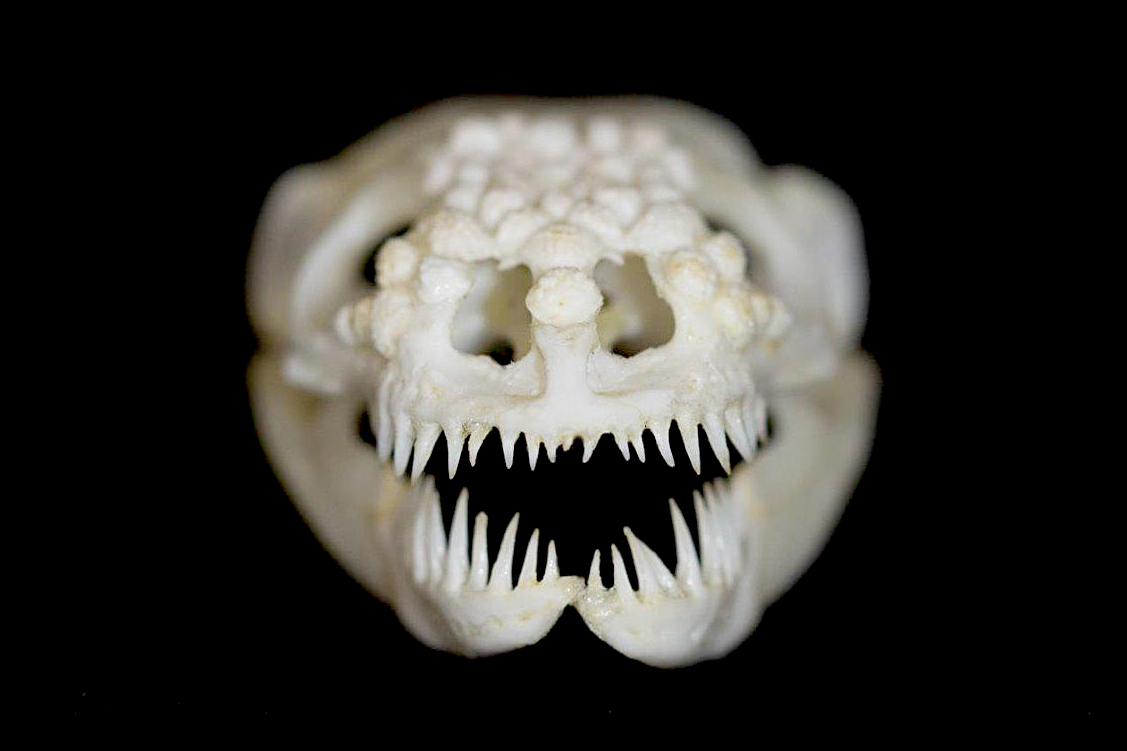
Heloderma suspectum skull with dentition, Photo by A. Laube

== In captivity ==
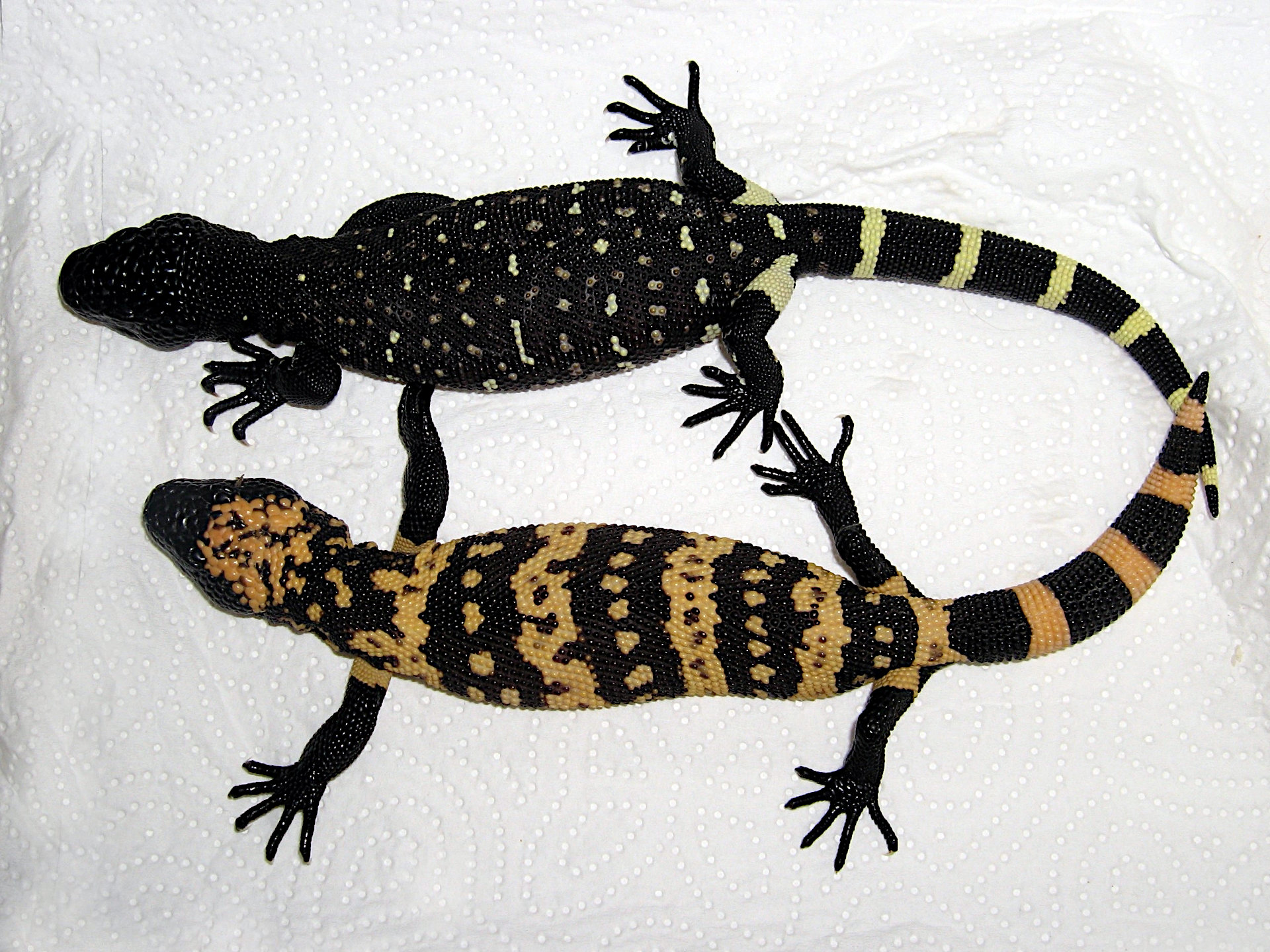
Hatchling sizes of H. horridum (top) and H. suspectum, Photo: R. Bär

H. horridum, H. exasperatum, and H. suspectum are frequently found in captivity and are well represented in zoos throughout much of the world. The other two species of Heloderma, H. alvarezi and H. charlesbogerti, have limited distribution areas, and only a few captive specimens are known.

== Gallery ==
Heloderma suspectum in captivity

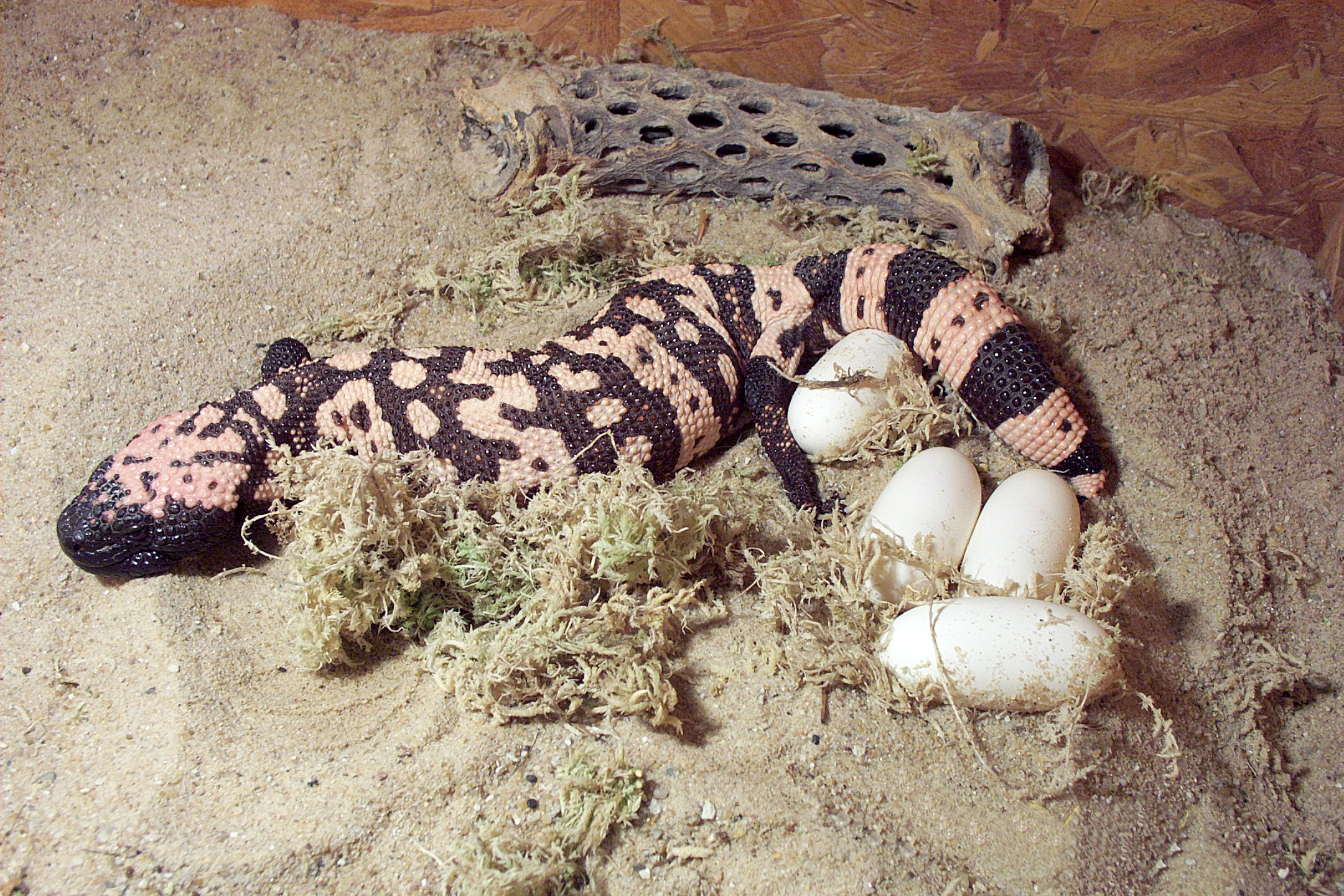
Heloderma suspectum with four eggs

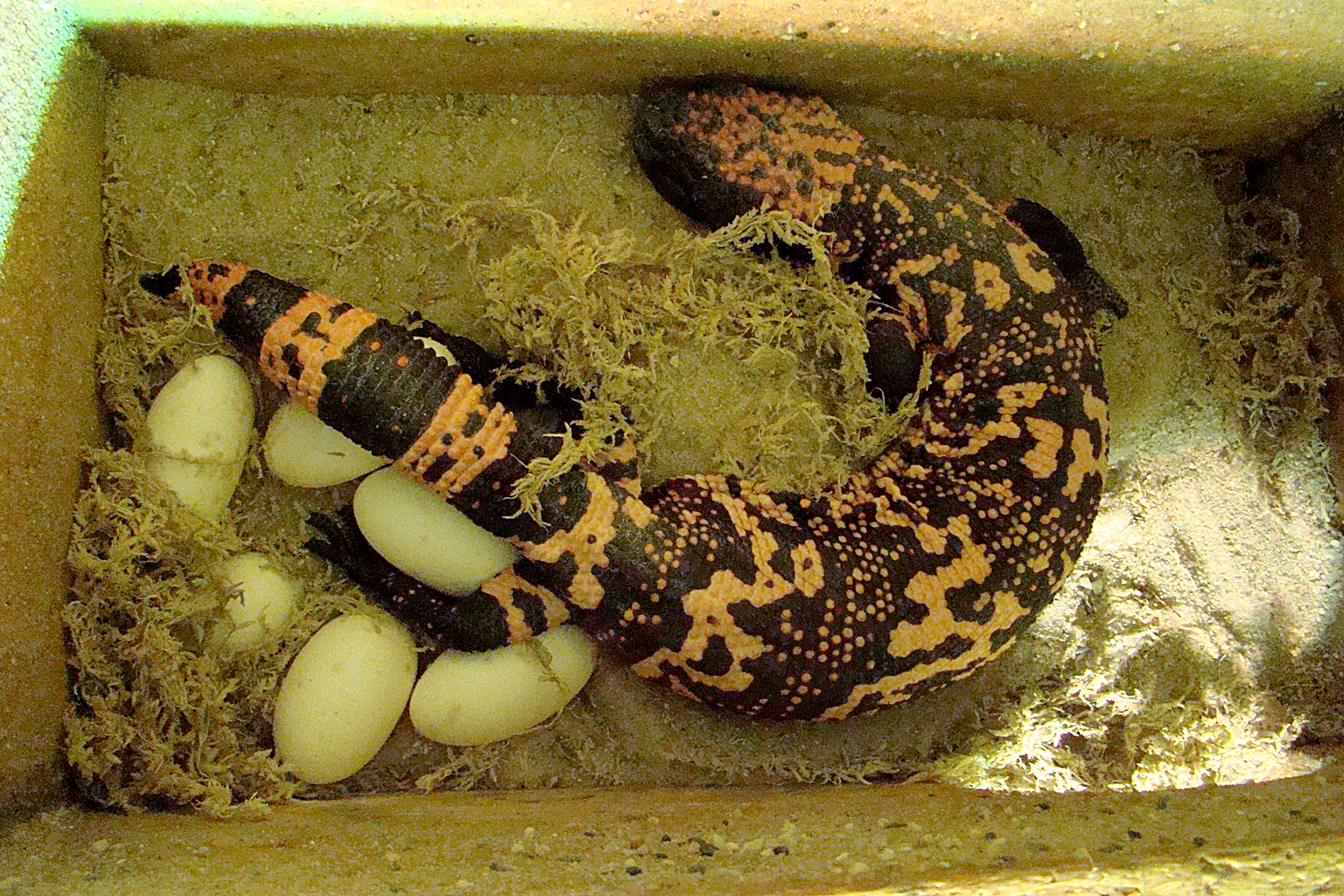
Heloderma suspectum with six eggs

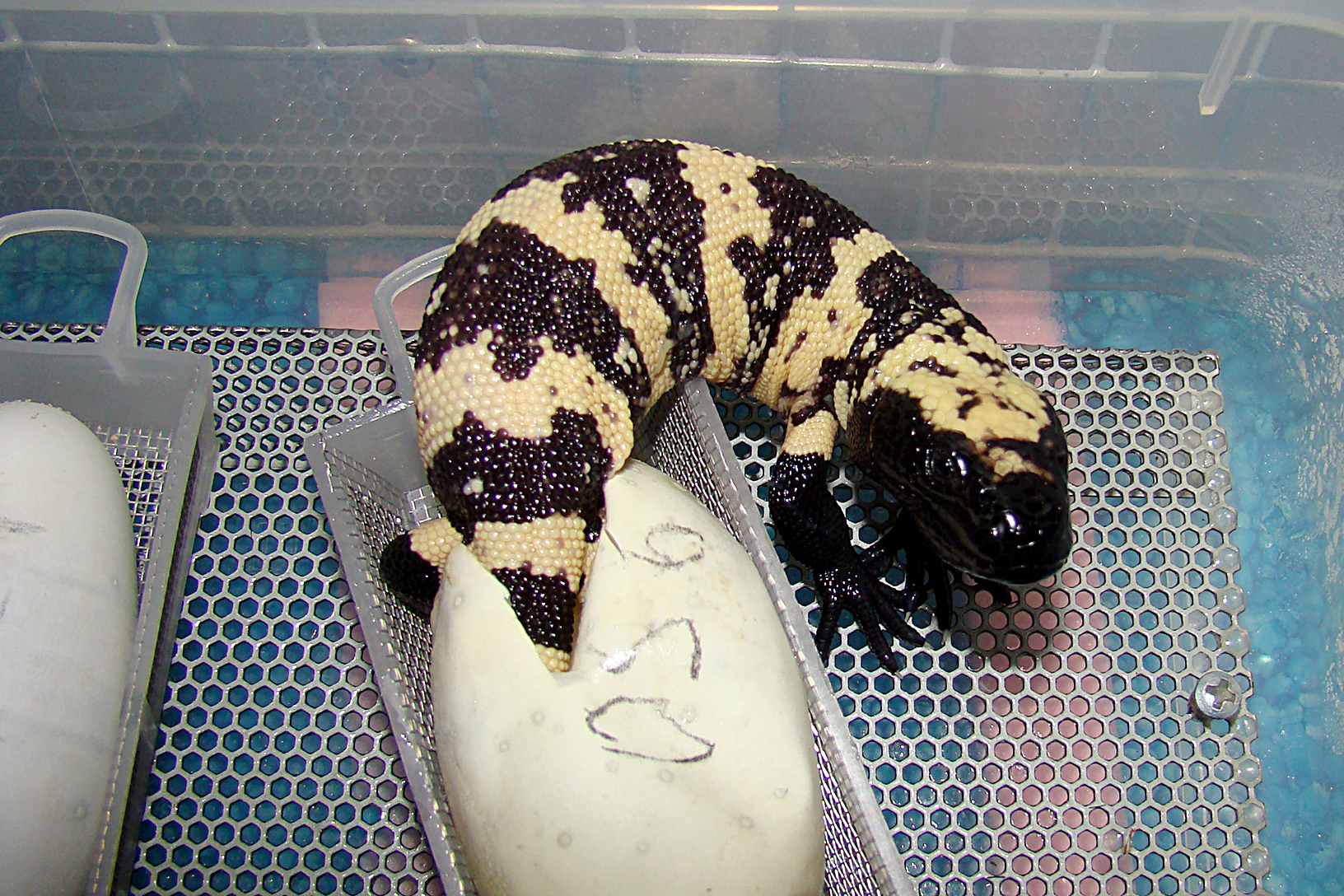
Gila monster hatching

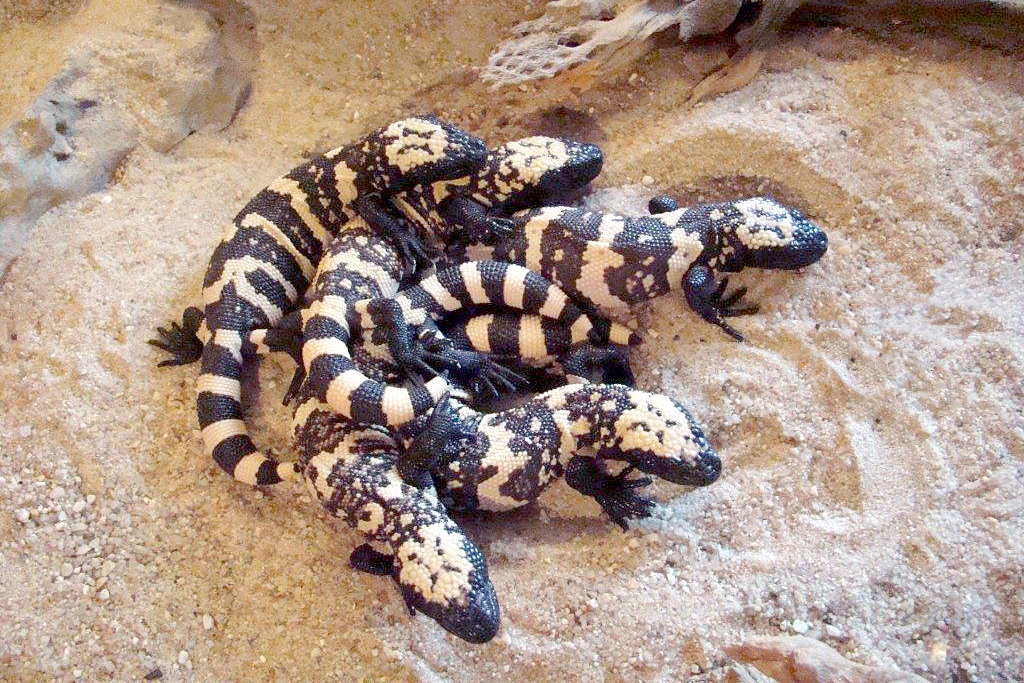
Group of young Gila monsters

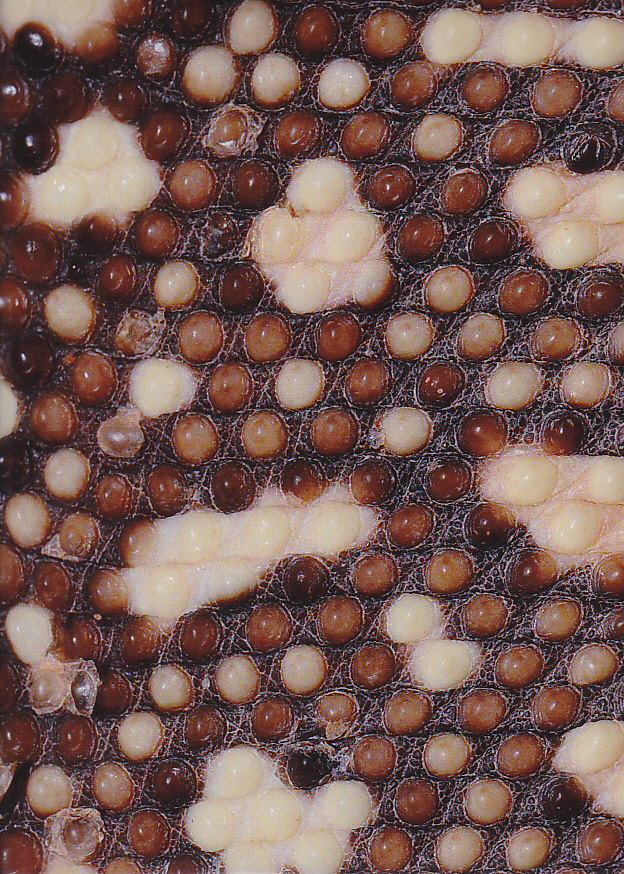
Heloderma skin

== Notes ==
- Ariano-Sánchez, Daniel (2008). "Envenomation by a wild Guatemalan beaded lizard Heloderma horridum charlesbogerti". Clinical Toxicology. 46 (9): 897–899. doi:10.1080/15563650701733031. PMID 18608297. S2CID 22173811.
- Ariano-Sánchez, D. & G. Salazar. 2007. Notes on the distribution of the endangered lizard, Heloderma horridum charlesbogerti, in the dry forests of eastern Guatemala: an application of multi-criteria evaluation to conservation. Iguana 14: 152–158.
- Ariano-Sánchez, D. 2006. The Guatemalan beaded lizard: endangered inhabitant of a unique ecosystem. Iguana 13: 178–183.
- CONVENTION ON INTERNATIONAL TRADE IN ENDANGERED SPECIES OF WILD FAUNA AND FLORA. 2007. Resume of the 14th Convention of the Parts. The Hague. The Netherlands.

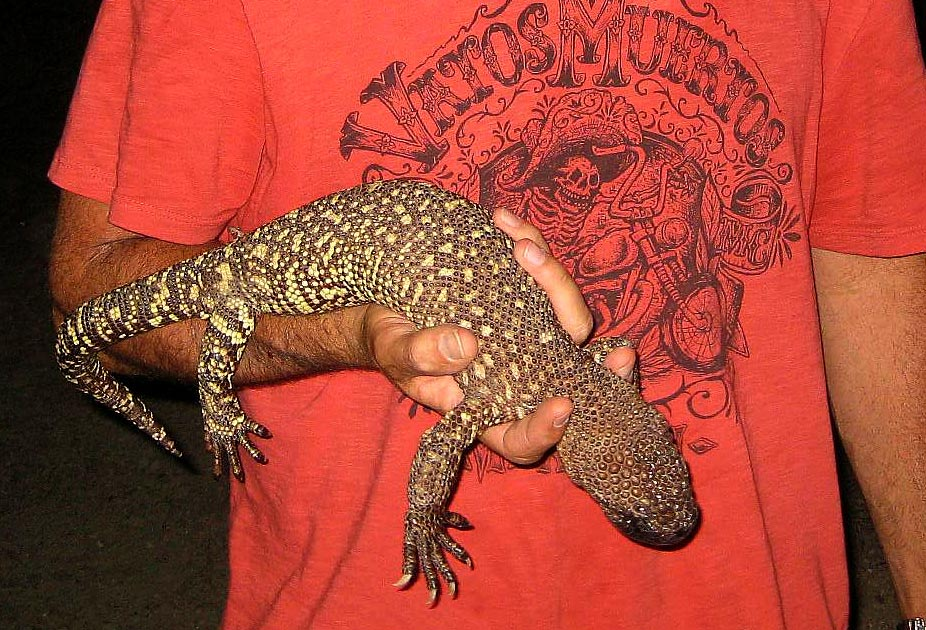
Heloderma exasperatum near Los Alamos

Wikispecies has information related to Heloderma suspectum
