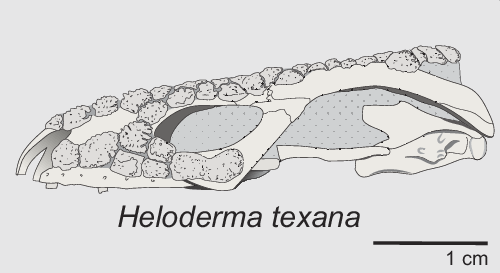
- Line drawing of type specimen

Scientific classification
- Kingdom: Animalia
- Phylum: Chordata
- Class: Reptilia
- Order: Squamata
- Suborder: Anguimorpha
- Family: Helodermatidae
- Genus: Heloderma
- Species: †H. texana

Binomial name
- †Heloderma texana Stevens, 1977

= Heloderma texana =

Heloderma texana Temporal range: Early Miocene

Extinct species of heloderm lizard

Heloderma texana is an extinct species of heloderm lizard known from Miocene sediments in Big Bend National Park. It is the oldest fossil record of the genus Heloderma in North America.
