= Gordon W. Schuett =

American evolutionary ecologist (born 1957)

- Born: March 5, 1957 (age 69); Flint, Michigan, United States
- Education: University of Toledo, Central Michigan University, University of Wyoming
- Known for: Winner and loser effects, Mate competition, Hormonal effects on behavior and reproduction, Parthenogenesis in snakes
- Scientific career
- Fields: Evolutionary biology, Herpetology
- Workplaces: Arizona State University West, Georgia State University, Zoo Atlanta, The Copperhead Institute
- Doctoral advisor: David Duvall and James Rose

Gordon W. Schuett (born March 5, 1957) is an American evolutionary ecologist who has conducted extensive research on reptiles. His work has focused primarily on snakes, but he has also published on turtles, lizards and amphibians. His most significant contributions have been to the studies of hormonal control of reproduction and behavior, winner-loser effects, long-term sperm storage, mate competition, and parthenogenesis.

== Biography ==
=== Graduate research ===
Schuett received a master's degree in biology from Central Michigan University in 1986, under the academic guidance of James C. Gillingham. His 88-page thesis was titled "Selected Topics on Reproduction in the Copperhead, Agkistrodon contortrix (Serpentes, Viperidae)". Schuett then attended The University of Wyoming where he earned his Ph.D. in 1994 under the mentorship of David Duvall and James D. Rose. His dissertation, titled "Determinants of Fighting Success in Male Copperheads (Serpentes, Viperidae)," was a major contribution to the field of animal behavior and has since been featured in text books

=== Postdoctoral research ===
After finishing his Ph.D., Schuett took a 1-year postdoctoral position under William Murdoch (University of Wyoming) studying hormone levels in both male and female copperheads during reproduction and male-male agonistic bouts. In 1993, he earned a 2-year postdoctoral position at Arizona State University. While there he successfully applied for an assistant professorship. Schuett has subsequently held positions at Georgia State University and Zoo Atlanta. Since 2003, Schuett has been an adjunct professor of biology at Georgia State University.

=== Publications ===
Schuett has published over 120 peer-reviewed journal articles, 21 peer-reviewed book chapters, and more than 25 popular magazine articles, and he coauthored a zoology laboratory manual. Schuett has served as conference co-organizer and chief editor for two peer-reviewed scholarly volumes, Biology of the Vipers, which has been made available online, and The Rattlesnakes of Arizona, some of which has been released online by individual authors. He coauthored the popular book Rattlesnakes of the Grand Canyon and was the founding editor of the journal Herpetological Natural History.
