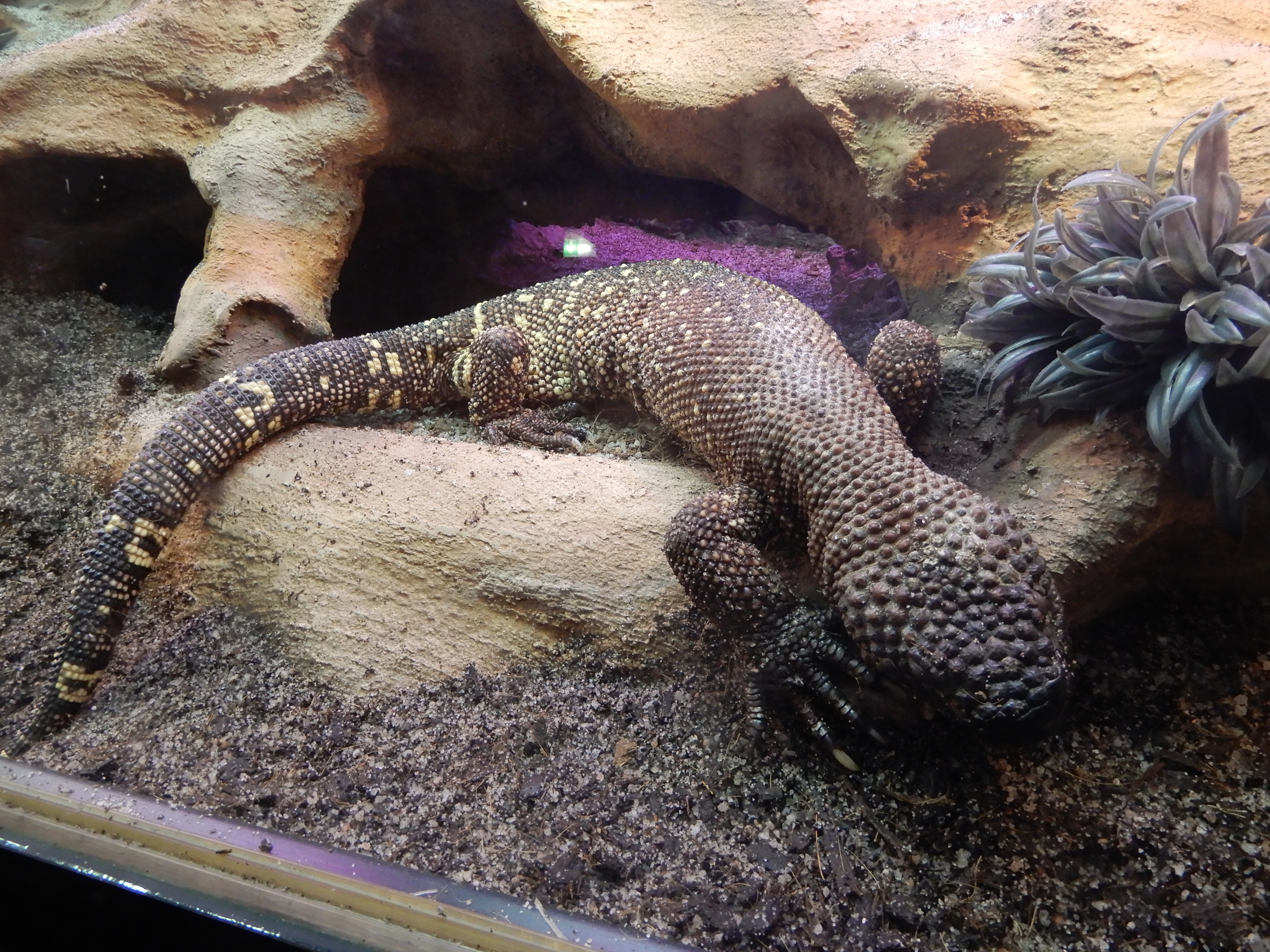
- At Palais de la Découverte, France

Conservation status
- CITES Appendix II
- Least Concern (IUCN 3.1)

Scientific classification
- Kingdom: Animalia
- Phylum: Chordata
- Class: Reptilia
- Order: Squamata
- Suborder: Anguimorpha
- Family: Helodermatidae
- Genus: Heloderma
- Species: H. exasperatum

Binomial name
- Heloderma exasperatum Bogert & Martín del Campo, 1956

Synonyms
- Heloderma horridum exasperatum Bogert & Martín del Campo, 1956; Heloderma exasperatum — Reiserer et al., 2013

= Heloderma exasperatum =

Rio Fuerte beaded lizard

Species of reptile

Heloderma exasperatum, the Rio Fuerte beaded lizard, is a venomous species of beaded lizard in the family Helodermatidae. It is found in the tropical forests and shrublands of western Mexico, specifically around the Rio Fuerte and Rio Mayo basins. It is often found in or near abandoned mammal burrows and sources of water.

== Geographic range ==
H. exasperatum is found in southwestern Chihuahua and southern Sonora, Mexico, up to an altitude of 1,400 m (4,600 ft).

== Description ==
As an adult, the Rio Fuerte beaded lizard ranges from 60 to 90 cm (23.6 to 35.4 in) in total length (including tail). It can weigh up to 4 kg (8.8 lb). It is very similar to the Mexican beaded lizard in appearance and size.

== Diet ==
H. exasperatum feeds mainly on reptile eggs, but also eats bird eggs, and nestlings of birds and mammals.

== Reproduction ==
H. exasperatum is oviparous.

== Taxonomy ==
The Rio Fuerte beaded lizard is a member of the family Helodermatidae. The species was formerly considered a subspecies of the Mexican beaded lizard, which is its closest living relative, but was elevated to full species status in 2013.

== Etymology ==
The generic name, Heloderma, means "studded skin", from the Ancient Greek words hêlos (ηλος), meaning "the head of a nail or stud", and derma (δερμα), meaning "skin".

The specific name, exasperatum, means "completely rough" in Latin.
