= Heloderma alvarezi =

Conservation status
- Vulnerable (IUCN 3.1)

Scientific classification
- Kingdom: Animalia
- Phylum: Chordata
- Class: Reptilia
- Order: Squamata
- Suborder: Anguimorpha
- Family: Helodermatidae
- Genus: Heloderma
- Species: H. alvarezi

Binomial name
- Heloderma alvarezi Bogert & Martin del Campo, 1956

Species of lizard

Heloderma alvarezi, the Chiapan beaded lizard or black beaded lizard, is a species of lizard of the Helodermatidae family. It is found in Mexico and Guatemala.
