= Pilbara rock monitor =

Conservation status
- Least Concern (IUCN 3.1)

Scientific classification
- Kingdom: Animalia
- Phylum: Chordata
- Class: Reptilia
- Order: Squamata
- Suborder: Anguimorpha
- Family: Varanidae
- Genus: Varanus
- Subgenus: Odatria
- Species: V. pilbarensis

Binomial name
- Varanus pilbarensis Storr, 1980

Species of lizard

The Pilbara rock monitor (Varanus pilbarensis) is a small member of monitor lizard of the subgenus Odatria endemic to the Chichester Range in Western Australia.

== Taxonomy ==
The population was described in 1980 by Glenn Storr, selecting a specimen collected in 1971 by J. C. Wombey at the Chichester gorge as the holotype of a new species.

A population to the south was identified as a sister species, and a new description Varanus hamersleyensis was published in 2014. The characteristics of this species, which originally included several specimens to the south of the Fortescue River, were redefined to distinguish it from those in the Hamersley Range.

== Description ==
A species of Varanus, carnivorous reptiles, that is predominately reddish in colour and favours rocky habitat. Their size is relatively small, with a total length not exceeding 470 millimetres. Varanus pilbarensis tails are up to twice the length of the snout to vent measurement, rounded and with strong band markings along their length, and display black and cream stripes toward their end. An arrangement of spiny and comb-like scales near the tail base distinguishes this species from its near relations, as does the high position of the nostrils on the snout. The legs have patches of black and cream, the feet bear short, thick and strongly curved claws. The upper surfaces of their loose skin has series of black ringed light grey eye-like patterns in the scales, at the back, neck and upper parts of the limbs.

== Distribution range and habitat ==
They are restricted to the Pilbara region in the northwest of Australia. A similar species Varanus kingorum occurs to the north, in the Kimberley region, in a non-overlapping distribution range. Varanus pilbarensis occurs at the Chichester Range in the Pilbara region, another species, Varanus hamersleyensis, is named for its range south of the Fortescue River basin at the Hamersley Range; the latter is darker and marking less obvious than this species. Like other rock dwelling varanids in the Pilbara region, one of around ten species in the herpetological "hotspot", the population has become geographically isolated and diverged as a distinguishable genetic lineage.
