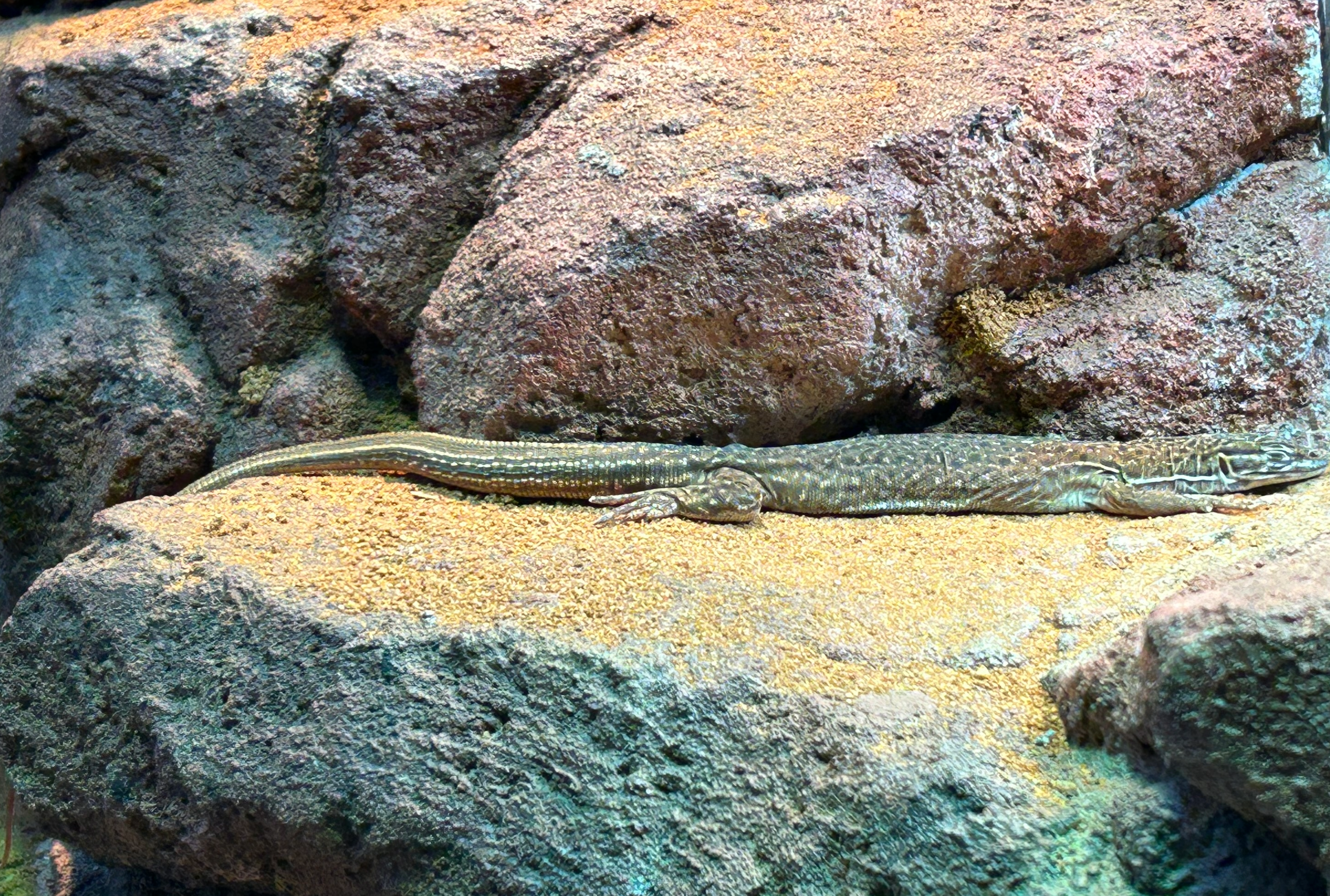

Conservation status
- Least Concern (IUCN 3.1)

Scientific classification
- Kingdom: Animalia
- Phylum: Chordata
- Class: Reptilia
- Order: Squamata
- Suborder: Anguimorpha
- Family: Varanidae
- Genus: Varanus
- Subgenus: Odatria
- Species: V. eremius

Binomial name
- Varanus eremius Lucas & Frost, 1895

= Rusty desert monitor =

Species of lizard

The rusty desert monitor (Varanus eremius) is a species of small monitor lizards native to Australia. It is also known as the pygmy desert monitor. The monitor lizard belongs to the subgenus Odatria along with the pygmy mulga monitor. This monitor lizard is oviparous as with other monitor lizards.

== Taxonomy ==
A description of the species was presented to the Royal Society of Victoria in 1895 by Arthur H. S. Lucas and Charles Frost.

== Distribution ==
Varanus eremius is the most widespread of the pygmy goannas. It lives in desert and semidesert areas of South Australia, Western Australia, and the Northern Territory. Its range possibly includes Queensland, as well.; Storr & Harold 1980).

== Description ==
The rusty desert monitor reaches a total length of about 50 cm. The colouration of this monitor lizard on the upper side is light to dark reddish-brown with numerous, irregularly distributed, black or deep-brown spots. Sometimes, smaller primrose or cream-colored spots are present. Its tail shows alternating cream-colored and deep-brown longitudinal stripes, which are often broken up into scattered spots at the tail base. A conspicuous black stripe occurs from the snout to the eye.

== Behaviour ==
This species spends its life on the ground and seldom climbs trees. No successful breeding in captivity has yet been reported.

=== Diet ===
Stomach contents indicate the diet by volume of the rusty desert monitor consists mainly of other lizards (76%), especially Ctenotus. The remainder of animals eaten by this monitor include large grasshoppers and occasional scorpions, centipedes, cockroaches and caterpillars.

=== Parasites ===
As a result of a diet of primarily lizard prey, which are hosts for physalopteran nematodes, this species in the wild has a higher prevalence and intensity of larval cysts in the stomach tissue and body cavity than any other species of monitor lizard. However, the development of worms are arrested in a cystic stage in V. eremius, reducing the burden of adult worms on the host's body.
