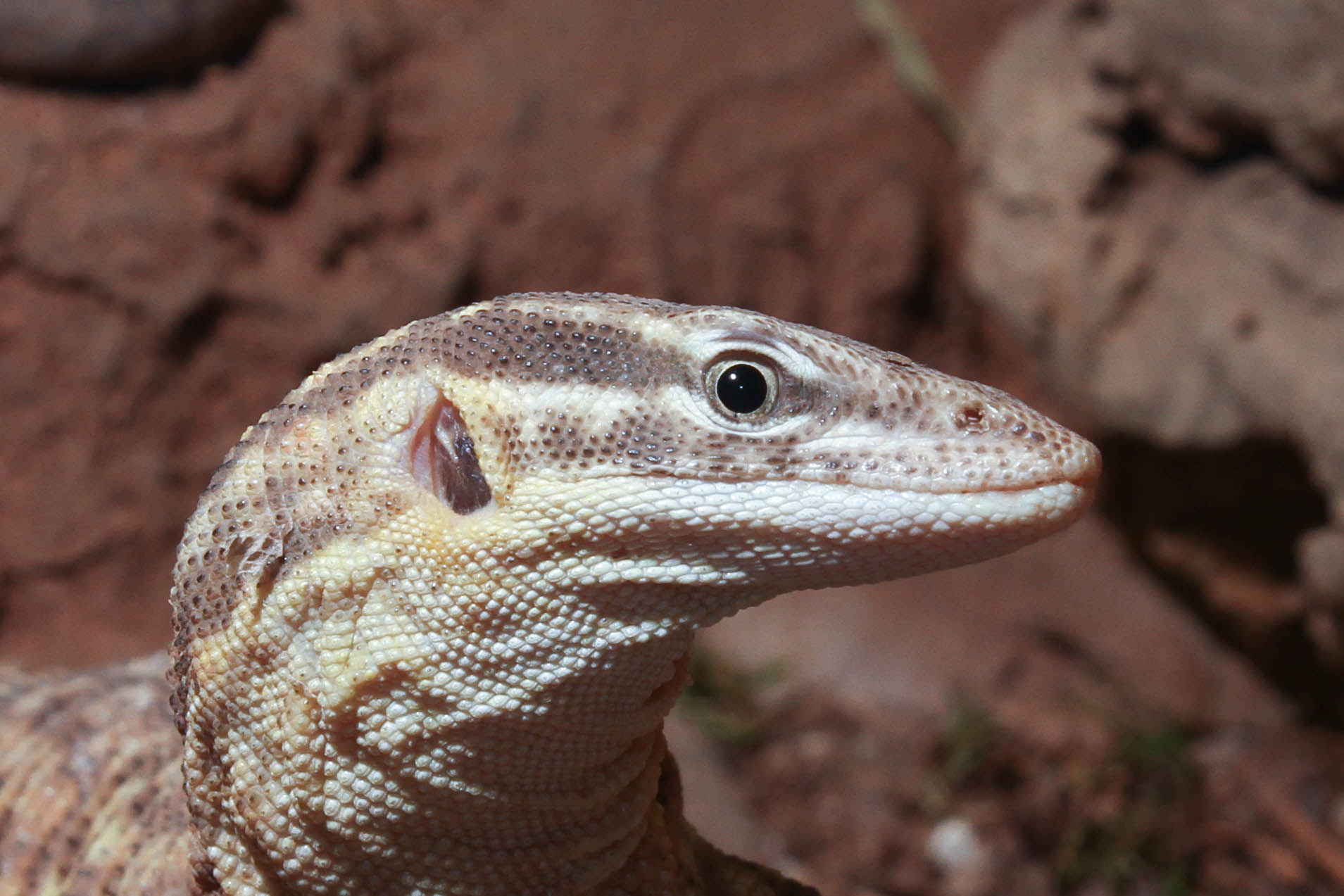
- Spiny-tailed monitor at the Cincinnati Zoo

Scientific classification
- Kingdom: Animalia
- Phylum: Chordata
- Class: Reptilia
- Order: Squamata
- Suborder: Anguimorpha
- Family: Varanidae
- Genus: Varanus
- Subgenus: Odatria; Gray, 1838

Type species
- Varanus tristis Schlegel, 1839

Species
- V. acanthurus; V. auffenbergi; V. baritji; V. brevicauda; V. bushi; V. caudolineatus; V. eremius; V. gilleni; V. glauerti; V. glebopalma; V. hamersleyensis; V. iridis; V. kingorum; V. mitchelli; V. phosphoros; V. pilbarensis; V. primordius; V. scalaris; V. semiremex; V. similis; V. sparnus; V. storri; V. timorensis; V. tristis; V. umbra

= Varanus (Odatria) =

Subgenus of reptiles

Odatria, commonly known as dwarf monitors, consists of small monitor lizards found in Australia, New Guinea and Wallacea. Species in this subgenus include the smallest monitor species in the world, the tiny 16 gram Dampier Peninsula monitor, but also includes some medium sized species such as the 240 gram black-palmed rock monitor.

== Taxonomy ==
Odatria was coined by John Edward Gray in 1838 as a genus name.

Odatria is the most species diverse subgenus of monitor lizards, with 22 different species. The subgenus also includes two species complexes represented by the spiny-tailed monitor and the Timor monitor. Alternatively, Vidal et al. 2012 splits Odatria into two species groups represented by the spiny-tailed monitor and the black-headed monitor.

In the past, tree monitors such as the green tree monitor have sometimes been included within Odatria as well as Euprepriosaurus, but now form their own subgenus Hapturosaurus.

A 2020 phylogenomic study by Brennan et al. found that Odatria is most closely related to much larger Australian monitor lizards from the subgenus Varanus, which includes the largest living lizard, the Komodo dragon, as well as the monotypic subgenus Papusaurus of which the crocodile monitor is the only member of. Together, Odatria, Varanus, and Papusaurus form a monophyletic clade of Indo-Australopapuan monitors.

The same study found the black-palmed rock monitor, Odatria glebopalma, the largest species within Odatria, to be sister to the rest of Odatria Vidal et al. 2012 recovers O. glebopalma as sister to all other members of the tristis group of Varanus.

During the early-mid Oligocene, the genus Varanus dispersed in two directions. The southeastern dispersion into Indo-Australia likely occurred shortly after the collision of the Asian and Australian tectonic plates, which created a connection between Sahul and Sundaland, i.e., an Indonesian land bridge that would have facilitated the dispersal of monitor lizards into Australia. The existence of this land bridge also likely allowed the Indo-Australopapuan clade including many Odatria species to disperse back into Indonesia. True monitors (subgenus Varanus) and Papuan monitors (subgenus Papusaurus) form a clade that is considered the sister taxon of Odatria.

== Phylogeny ==
=== Species groups ===
Vidal et al. 2012 separated Odatria into two species groups; the V. acanthurus group included V. acanthurus, V. baritji, V. brevicauda, V. bushi, V. caudolineatus, V. eremius, V. gilleni, V. kingorum, V. primordius, and V. storri, while the V. tristis group included V. auffenbergi, V. glauerti, V. glebopalma, V. mitchelli, V. pilbarensis, V. scalaris, V. semiremex, V. similis, V. timorensis, and V. tristis.

To maintain monophyly in light of Brennan et al. 2020, V. glebopalma would be excluded from the V. tristis group, and more species would be included as in the following:

V. acanthurus group - (V. acanthurus, V. baritji, V. brevicauda, V. bushi, V. caudolineatus, V. eremius, V. gilleni, V. kingorum, V. primordius, V. sparnus and V. storri)

V. tristis group - (V. auffenbergi, V. glauerti, V. hamersleyensis, V. mitchelli, V. pilbarensis, V. scalaris, V. semiremex, V. similis, V. timorensis, and V. tristis)

| Vidal et al. 2012 | Brennan et al. 2020 |

== Ecology ==
=== Behaviour ===
The genus is diverse in terms of behaviour, and includes terrestrial, arboreal, and semiaquatic species. Many are saxicolous, i.e., they are strongly associated with rocky habitats, while some others prefer forests.

Ritualized fighting sometimes occurs between males. Unlike many larger monitors which grapple with each other while standing on their hind legs, some dwarf monitor species instead grapple each other with all 4 limbs, belly to belly, and roll around on the ground trying to force the other onto its back. Biting may also occur.

=== Diet ===
Orthopteran insects and other species of lizards make up the mainstay of the diet for most species. One species, the rusty desert monitor, consumes a particularly large amount of lizard prey with lizards such as various species of Ctenotus accounting for up to 70% of their diet by weight. Larger species such as black-palmed rock monitors are also known to prey on other dwarf monitors.

=== Reproduction ===
Like all other monitors, all species within Odatria are oviparous. As parthenogenesis is well known in monitor lizards in some other subgenera, it is possible that dwarf monitors are also capable of parthenogenesis; there is a report of a suspected case of parthenogenesis in peacock monitors.

=== Parasites ===
Physalopterid nematodes of the genus Abbreviata are major gastrointestinal parasites in many species of reptiles. Those that parasitize dwarf monitors include A. hastaspicula and A. levicauda; the former may specialize in Australian monitors. Depending on the species, more than half of all individuals collected from the wild may be infected, but in most cases the parasites do minimal harm. Various other parasites are also known, but in comparatively much low numbers. In captivity, wild caught individuals may suffer more from the effects of parasites due to the stressful process of being taken from the wild and being shipped elsewhere.

== Conservation and captivity ==
Under the EPBC Act, the export of live Australian Odatria species for commercial purposes is prohibited. Illegal trade of these species still persist, as many dwarf monitor species are in great demand in the pet trade. In Australia, monitor lizards are threatened by the invasive cane toad, as they have no natural immunity to the toad's toxins when ingested.

Captive breeding for the pet trade has been successful in many such species however and lessens the pressure on wild populations. Some such as the often captive bred ridge-tailed monitor are popular pet lizards, in some cases as a "beginner monitor" to train those who are aspiring to eventually keep larger and less forgiving monitor lizard species.

== Species ==
| Species | Taxon author | Common name | Picture |
|---|---|---|---|
| V. glebopalma | Mitchell, 1955 | black-palmed rock monitor | |

Varanus acanthurus species group
| Species | Taxon author | Common name | Picture |
|---|---|---|---|
| V. acanthurus | Boulenger, 1885 | ackie monitor, Ackie's dwarf monitor, Australian spiny-tailed monitor, ridge-tailed monitor, spiny-tailed monitor | |
| V. baritji | M. King & Horner, 1987 | black-spotted ridge-tailed monitor, black-spotted spiny-tailed monitor, lemon-throated monitor, northern ridge-tailed monitor, White's dwarf goanna, White's dwarf monitor, Whites monitor, yellow-throated monitor | |
| V. brevicauda | Boulenger, 1898 | short-tailed monitor, short-tailed pygmy monitor | |
| V. bushi | Aplin, Fitch & D.J. King, 2006 | Bush's monitor, Bush's pygmy monitor, Pilbara monitor, Pilbara mulga monitor, Pilbara stripe-tailed monitor | |
| V. caudolineatus | Boulenger, 1885 | line-tailed pygmy monitor, stripe-tailed goanna, stripe-tailed monitor | |
| V. citrinus | Pavón-Vázquez, Esquerré, Fitch, Maryan, Doughty, Donnellan & Keogh, 2022 | Gulf ridge-tailed monitor | |
| V. eremius | Lucas & Frost, 1895 | pygmy desert monitor, rusty desert monitor | |
| V. gilleni | Lucas & Frost, 1895 | Gillen's monitor, mulga monitor, pygmy mulga monitor | |
| V. insulanicus | Mertens, 1958 | Groote Eylandt monitor | |
| V. kingorum | Storr, 1980 | Kings' goanna, Kings' monitor, Kings' rock monitor, pygmy rock monitor | |
| V. ocreatus | Storr, 1980 | Storr's monitor, western Storr's monitor | |
| V. primordius | Mertens, 1942 | northern blunt-spined monitor, northern ridge-tailed monitor | |
| V. sparnus | Doughty, Keally, Fitch & Donnellan, 2014 | Dampier peninsula goanna, Dampier Peninsula monitor | |
| V. storri | Mertens, 1966 | Storr's monitor | |

Varanus tristis species group
| Species | Taxon author | Common name | Picture |
|---|---|---|---|
| V. auffenbergi | Sprackland, 1999 | Auffenberg's monitor, peacock monitor | |
| V. delcantoi | Patschke, Koch, Schmitz & Böhme, 2025 | Kisar Island monitor | |
| V. glauerti | Mertens, 1957 | Glauert's monitor, Kakadu sand goanna, Kimberley rock monitor | |
| V. hamersleyensis | Maryan, Oliver, Fitch & O'Connell, 2014 | Hamersley Range rock monitor, Southern Pilbara rock goanna | |
| V. iridis | Zozaya, Read, Macor, Pavón-Vázquez, Gale, Wright & Broady, 2026 | rainbow rock monitor | |
| V. mitchelli | Mertens, 1958 | Mitchell's water monitor | |
| V. phosphoros | Zozaya, Read, Macor, Pavón-Vázquez, Gale, Wright & Broady, 2026 | yellow-headed rock monitor | |
| V. pilbarensis | Storr, 1980 | Pilbara rock monitor | |
| V. scalaris | Mertens, 1941 | banded tree monitor, spotted tree monitor | |
| V. semiremex | W. Peters, 1869 | rusty monitor | |
| V. similis | Mertens, 1958 | similis monitor, spotted tree monitor | |
| V. timorensis | Gray, 1831 | spotted tree monitor, Timor monitor | |
| V. tristis | Schlegel, 1838 | black-headed monitor, black-tailed monitor, freckled monitor, mournful monitor, racehorse monitor | |
| V. umbra | Zozaya, Read, Macor, Pavón-Vázquez, Gale, Wright & Broady, 2026 | orange-headed rock monitor | |
