= Varanus similis =

Scientific classification
- Kingdom: Animalia
- Phylum: Chordata
- Class: Reptilia
- Order: Squamata
- Suborder: Anguimorpha
- Family: Varanidae
- Genus: Varanus
- Subgenus: Odatria
- Species: V. similis

Binomial name
- Varanus similis Mertens, 1958

Synonyms
- Varanus scalaris similis Mertens, 1958; Varanus timorensis similis Mertens, 1958

Species of lizard

Varanus similis, known commonly as the Similis monitor or spotted tree monitor, is a small species of monitor lizard found in Australia, Indonesia and Papua New Guinea.

== Taxonomy ==
It was originally described as a subspecies of the Timor monitor (Varanus timorensis similis) by German herpetologist Robert Mertens in 1958. It was described as a separate species by Hans-Peter Berghof in 2001, with the type locality being Groote Eylandt in the Northern Territory.

Its specific name comes from the Latin similis, presumably in reference to its anatomical and physical similarity to the Timor monitor and the Banded tree monitor. The three species are often considered to be conspecific with one another.

== Description ==
The species is primarily carnivorous and will feed on almost anything, including frogs, fish, eggs, crustaceans, molluscs, insects and other invertebrates as well as small mammals & reptiles.

It is oviparous and can lay from 6 to 19 eggs in a single clutch.

As an adult it can grow to a length of 45 to 52 cm and can live up to 12 years or longer.

== Habitat and distribution ==
It can be found in the sclerophyll forest, rainforest and swampland of northern Australia and southern New Guinea.

Within Australia, Varanus similis is native to northeastern areas of the mainland in Queensland and the Northern Territory, as opposed to Varanus scalaris which can be found in the northwest.
