= Varanus delcantoi =

Scientific classification
- Kingdom: Animalia
- Phylum: Chordata
- Class: Reptilia
- Order: Squamata
- Suborder: Anguimorpha
- Family: Varanidae
- Genus: Varanus
- Subgenus: Odatria
- Species: V. delcantoi

Binomial name
- Varanus delcantoi Patschke, Koch, Schmitz & Böhme, 2025

Species of monitor lizard

Varanus delcantoi is a species of medium-sized monitor lizard endemic to Kisar Island in Indonesia. It was formally described in 2025 and is a close relative of the Timor monitor.
