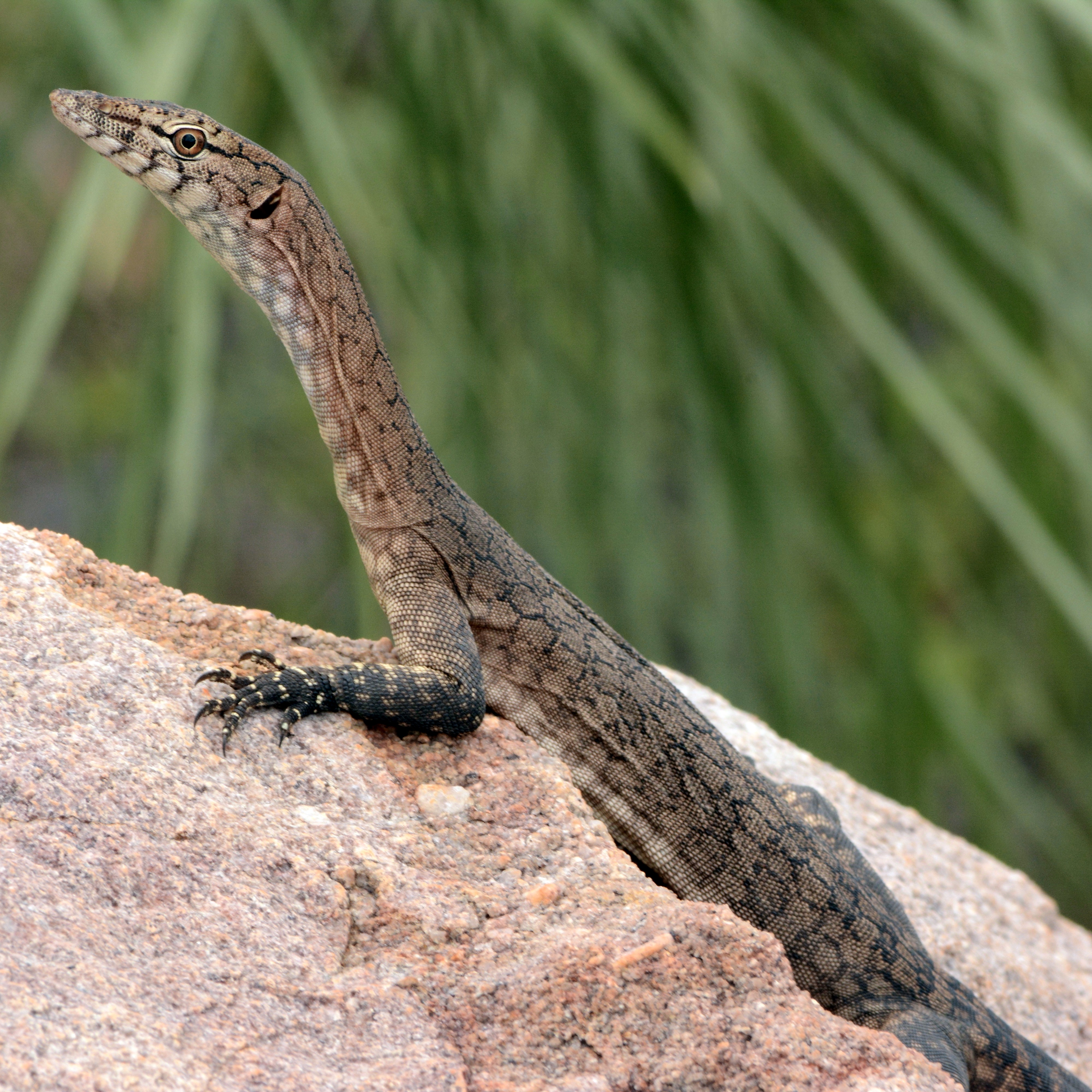

Conservation status
- Least Concern (IUCN 3.1)

Scientific classification
- Kingdom: Animalia
- Phylum: Chordata
- Class: Reptilia
- Order: Squamata
- Suborder: Anguimorpha
- Family: Varanidae
- Genus: Varanus
- Subgenus: Odatria
- Species: V. glebopalma

Binomial name
- Varanus glebopalma Mitchell, 1955

= Black-palmed rock monitor =

Species of lizard

The black-palmed rock monitor (Varanus glebopalma) is a member of the Varanidae family found in Australia. Also known as the twilight monitor or the long-tailed rock monitor, it is a member of the subgenus Odatria, and is found in the northern part of Australia in the Northern Territory and Western Australia, as well as Queensland. Specifically, its distribution extends from Mount Isa in the east to the Kimberleys in the west. Its habitat is areas of rock escarpment, and large populations may be found in small areas.

== Taxonomy ==
A species first described in 1955 by South Australian curator Francis John Mitchell, nominating the holotype as a specimen obtained at Lake Hubert in the Northern Territory. Mitchell's specimen was the only example available, and was shot by R. R. Miller near a sandstone outcrop during the 1948 American-Australian Scientific Expedition to Arnhem Land. The new species was allied to the infrageneric classification Varanus (Odatria).

Common names for the species include black-palmed and long-tailed rock monitor. The specific epithet glebopalma refers to the shiny black pads found on the undersides of their feet.

== Description ==
The black-palmed rock monitor reaches a total length of just over 100 cm. The coloration of V. glebopalma on the back shows a black ground color with some light brown scales, overall the skin is reddish or gray brown. The scales form a "reticulated pattern at the sides or small ocelli with a black central spot on top." Their tail is blackish for the first half of its length, becoming a creamy-yellow color. The top sides of the head and the limbs are black with small, light brown or cream-colored spots which "flow together". Their limbs have larger spots.

== Behaviour ==
This varanid is secretive, eluding casual observers and poorly recorded in surveys. Varanus glebopalma is extremely timid and able to move quickly, usually hunting in daylight hours; although activity at dusk or night is noted in descriptions this is likely to be a response to disturbance by the observers. Their hunting mode is as an ambush predator. In the wild, black-palmed rock monitors prefer to eat insects, lizards, and other small vertebrates. Orthopterans, species of grasshoppers, are sought in the dry season of Australia's north and skinks make up the majority of the diet during the wet, other prey captured and consumed includes frogs.

Individual range may be from 1.25 to over 7 hectares, ambushing prey on the move or foraging at narrow hiding places. A report of males avoiding another male presence is assumed to be a demonstration of territoriality, a behaviour unknown in any other varanid species.

== Distribution and habitat ==
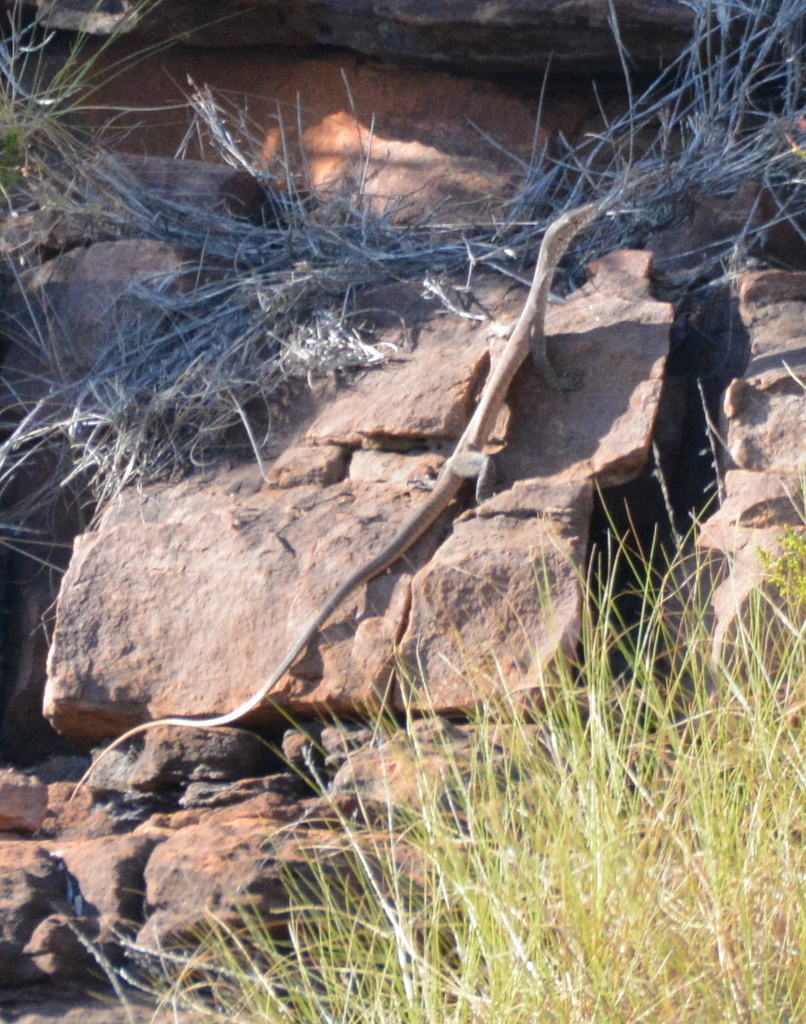
In Northern Territory

The distribution range of the species extends from the Kimberley, across the Top End and to the west of Queensland in the Mount Isa districts. They occur from the coast to inland regions, with an offshore population recorded at Adolphus Island. The habitat is complex rocky outcrops that provide crevices and boulders and only in association with open woodlands; despite the presence of trees in the local environment the species is not known to be arboreal. In the Yarrangguljna region of the Northern Territory the population's strongly preferred vegetation type is woodland dominated by Allosyncarpia ternata. This same habitat is occupied by another long-tailed monitor Varanus glauerti, and while the two species are closely sympatric they occupy distinct niches within this ecology. The range of habitat includes arid woodland and monsoonal forest near their strongly preferred refuge within crevices and boulders at the outskirts of sandstone escarpments and outcrops.

The assessment of the IUCN work group, published in 2017, listed this species as least concern, with a population that is assumed to be stable. As a consumer of amphibians, the species is assumed to be susceptible to the advance of Rhinella marina, a poisonous introduced species known in Australia as the cane toad.
