= Storr's monitor =

There are two species of lizard named Storr's monitor:

- Varanus storri
- Varanus ocreatus
