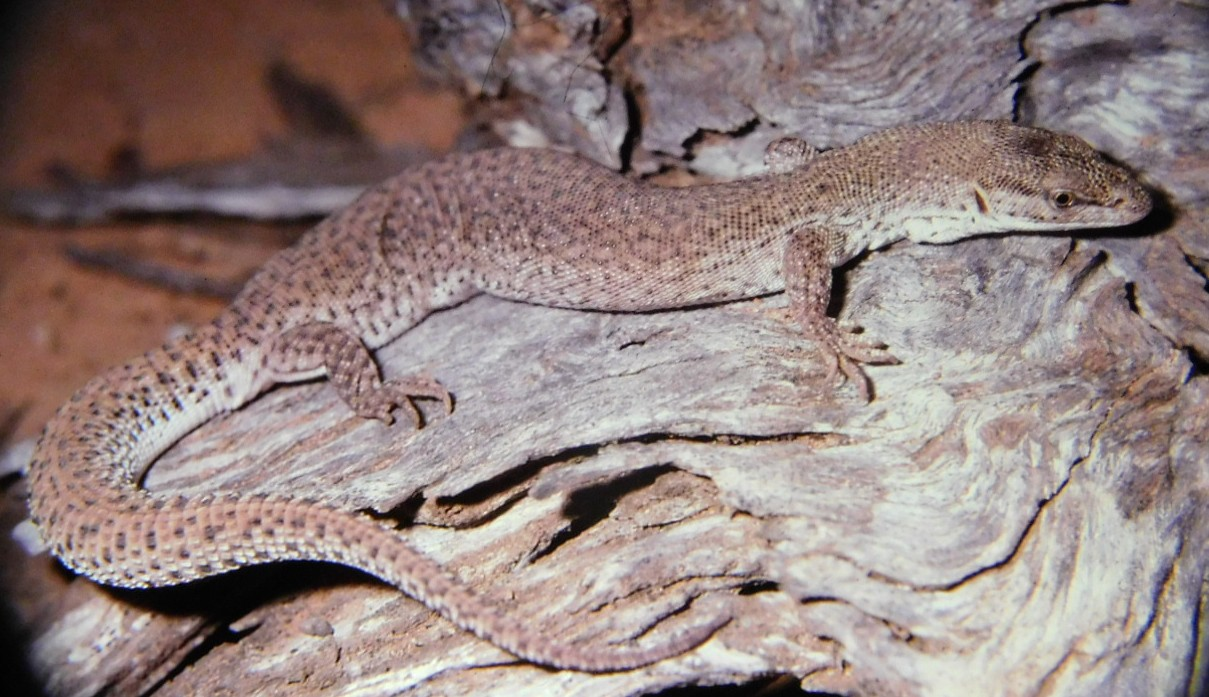

Conservation status
- Least Concern (IUCN 3.1)

Scientific classification
- Kingdom: Animalia
- Phylum: Chordata
- Class: Reptilia
- Order: Squamata
- Suborder: Anguimorpha
- Family: Varanidae
- Genus: Varanus
- Subgenus: Odatria
- Species: V. brevicauda

Binomial name
- Varanus brevicauda Boulenger, 1898
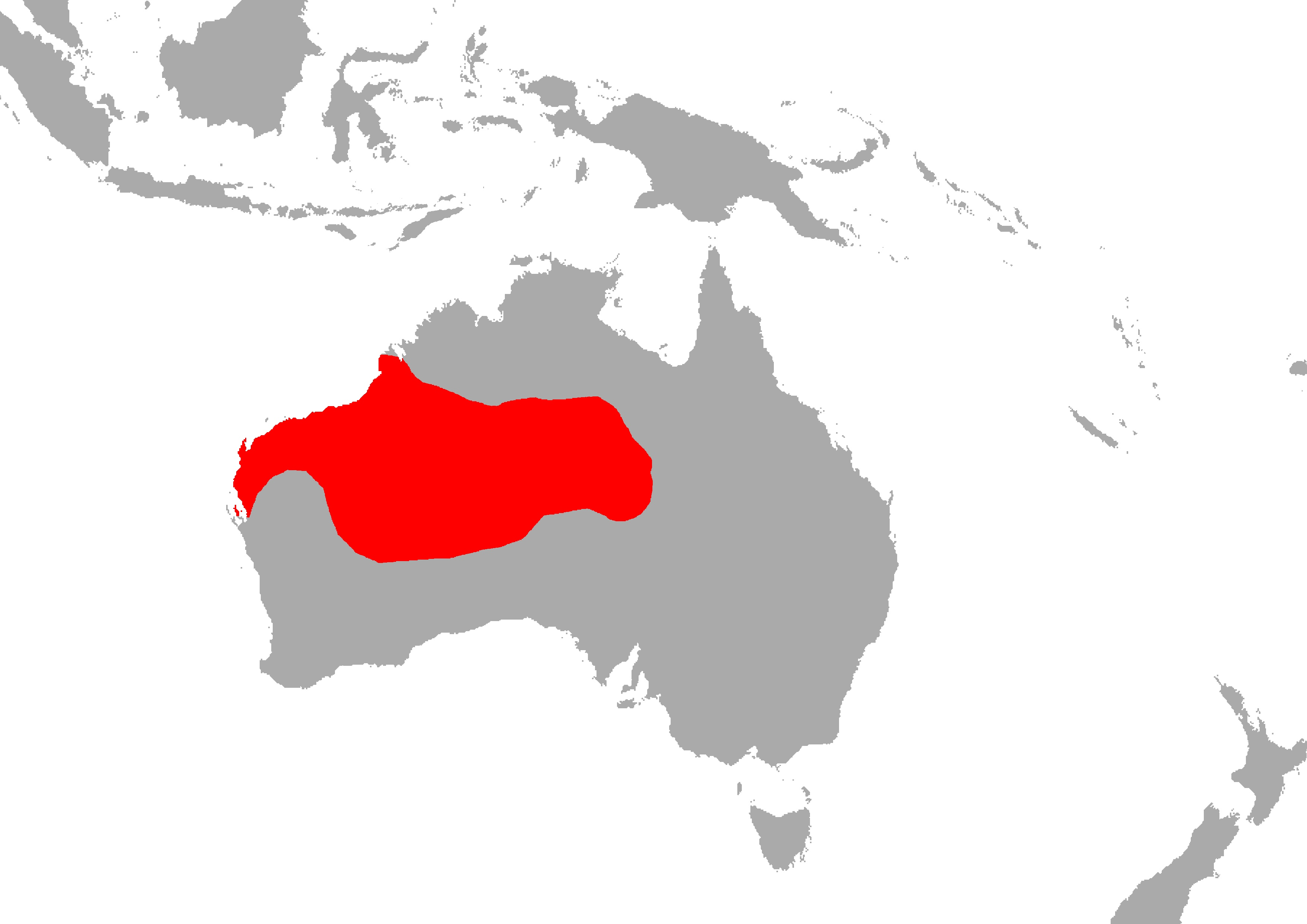

= Short-tailed pygmy monitor =

Species of lizard

The short-tailed pygmy monitor (Varanus brevicauda) is the second smallest living monitor lizard in the world with a maximum length of 25 cm.

== Distribution ==
The short-tailed pygmy monitor ranges throughout central Australia, from the coast of Western Australia through the interior of the Northern Territory, and from northwestern South Australia to western Queensland. The short-tailed pygmy monitor burrows in compacted, sandy loam and gravel, in areas dominated by spinifex (Triodia spp.). This terrestrial species is secretive and rarely seen active above ground; it is mainly encountered by digging up its burrow.

== Physical description ==
The short-tailed monitor is the smallest of the Varanid lizards, attaining a maximum adult length of only 8 inches. Newly hatched short-tailed monitors look just like the adults, but weigh about 1 to 2 grams and are only 1 to 2 inches in total length. Like all monitors the short-tailed monitor has a long neck, well developed limbs with five toes on both fore and hind limbs, strong claws, and a powerful tail that cannot undergo autotomy (Cogger and Zweifel 1998). The body color is usually a drab olive to brown color with lighter ocelli on the trunk. It is nearly impossible to determine the sex of most monitors by their outward appearance and the short-tailed monitor is no exception, as it is monomorphic.

== Behavior ==
Like most monitors, the short-tailed monitor is solitary in nature and avoids contact with other monitors, especially those that are bigger and could be a predator. However, due to the fact that short-tailed monitors are so small and mainly live in burrows it is not uncommon to find a very large population in a very small area. These monitors are very active diurnal foragers. The short-tailed monitor has a very keen sense of sight and hearing but attains the bulk of its sensory information through chemical signals picked up by the Jacobson's organ. These signals include mate recognition and competitor recognition. During the breeding season males will engage in combat for the right to mate with a female. The males will raise up on their hind limbs supported by their tails and wrestle until one is thrown to the ground.

== Diet ==
The short-tailed monitor is strictly carnivorous. Short-tailed pygmy monitors are highly active foragers in the wild, unlike most lizards. They eat insects such as grasshoppers, beetles, roaches, caterpillars, as well as reptile eggs, isopods, spiders, scorpions, centipedes, small lizards and occasionally frogs and even small snakes. These small monitors are bold and fierce predators, despite their size.

== Reproduction ==
The short-tailed monitor is oviparous. Short-tailed monitors exhibit internal fertilization. The male has paired intromittent organs known as hemipenes. Although the hemipenes are paired they are only used one at a time, depending on which is more convenient. Mating occurs for this monitor lizard in September and October after hibernation, and by February, the eggs hatch. The clutch size usually is two or three, but in some coastal areas, up to five eggs are produced. "In dry years when food is scarce no reproduction occurs at all."

== Habitat ==
The preferred habitat of the short-tailed monitor is arid regions dominated by spinifex. Spinifex are perennial grasses that form dense clumps, up to several feet in diameter, consisting of a central dense complex lattice-work and numerous outwardly directed needle-like spines.

== Predation and conservation ==
As the species' numbers are currently listed as 'least concern' by the IUCN, the main threat to short-tailed pygmy monitors is predation by larger animals; predators include (but are not limited to) birds of prey, dingoes, feral cats and dogs, owls, certain snakes and introduced red foxes. Other, larger species of monitor may pose a threat.

== Gallery ==
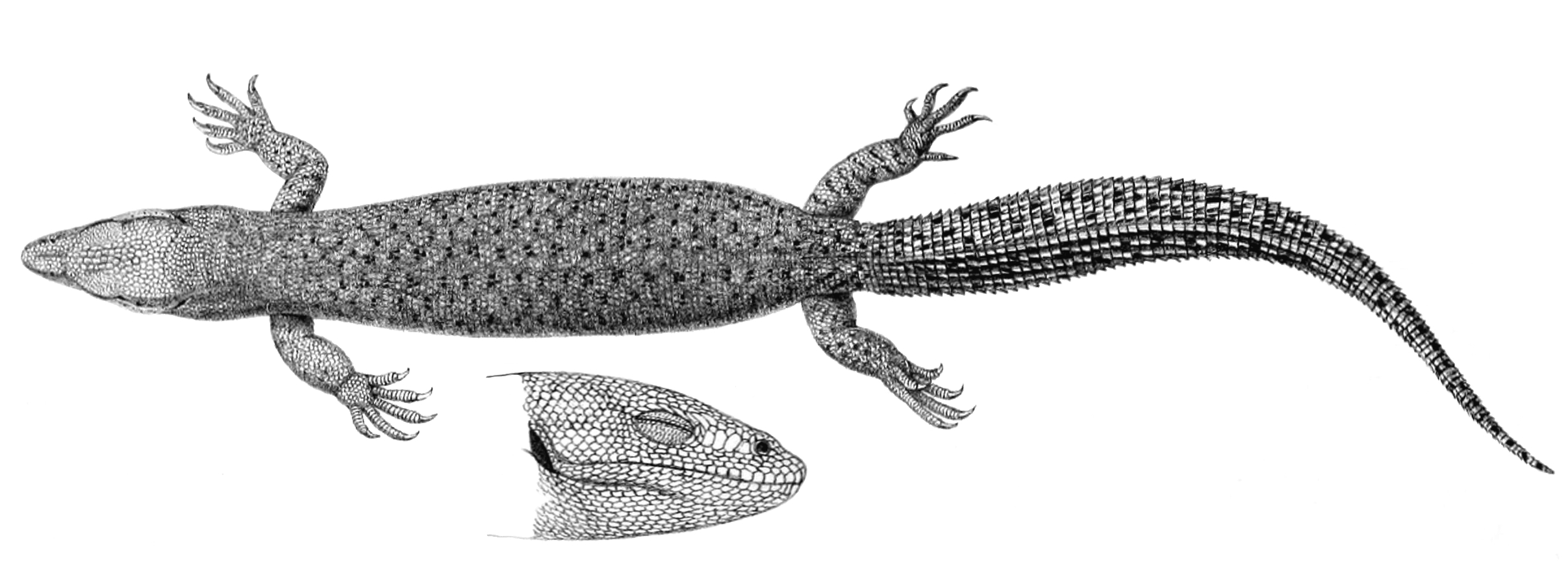

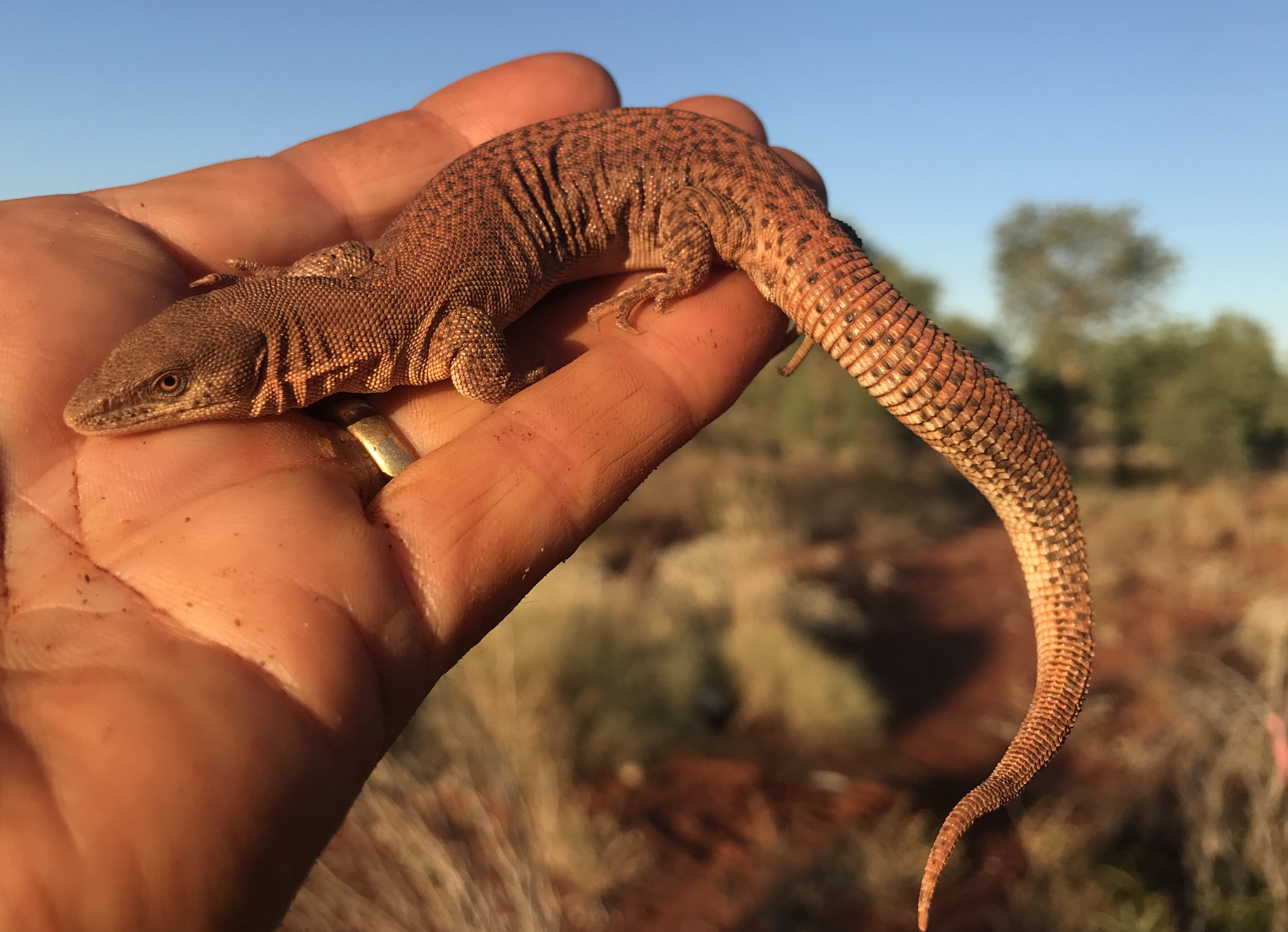
