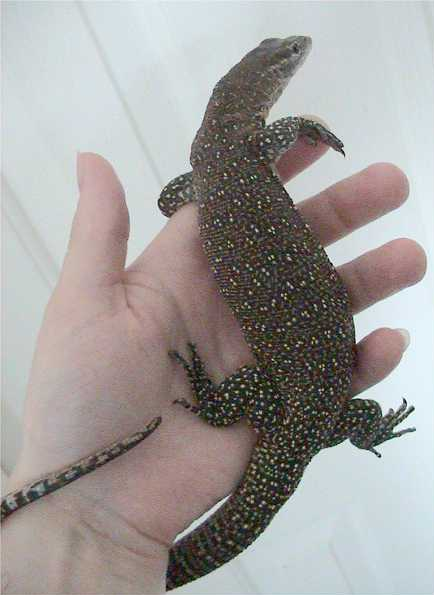

- Least Concern (IUCN 3.1)

Scientific classification
- Kingdom: Animalia
- Phylum: Chordata
- Class: Reptilia
- Order: Squamata
- Suborder: Anguimorpha
- Family: Varanidae
- Genus: Varanus
- Subgenus: Odatria
- Species: V. timorensis

Binomial name
- Varanus timorensis (Gray, 1831)

Synonyms
- Monitor timorensis Gray, 1831

= Varanus timorensis =

Species of lizard

The Timor monitor (Varanus timorensis), also known as the spotted tree monitor, is a species of small monitor lizard which can be found in Timor, Rote, Savu and other nearby islands in Timor-Leste and Indonesia.

== Taxonomy ==
The Kimberley rock monitor (Varanus glauerti), the banded tree monitor (Varanus scalaris), and the spotted tree monitor (Varanus similis) were once considered subspecies of the Timor monitor, but have all since been elevated to full species status.

Currently, the peacock monitor (Varanus auffenbergi) is considered a subspecies by some sources, but most sources consider it to be its own species.

== Description ==
The Timor monitor is a dwarf species of monitor lizard belonging to the subgenus Odatria. Generally, it is dark greenish-gray to almost black in background color, with bright gold-yellow or sometimes bluish spotting along its dorsal surface and a lighter straw-yellow color on its ventral side. It has a pointed snout, excellent eyesight and hearing, sharp teeth, and a prehensile tail that measures two-thirds of its total length. V. timorensis also has long, sharp claws well-suited for climbing and defense. The species grows to a maximum of 61 cm, and weighs between 100 and 350 g.

== Habitat ==
The Timor monitor lives in woodlands, dry forests and rainforests, where they inhabit trees, shrubs, bushes and other above ground vegetation.

== Behavior ==
Timor monitors are arboreal, diurnal lizards. Their diet consist of a variety of invertebrates, such as scorpions, orthopterans, spiders, mantids, bees and cockroaches, and other lizards, such as geckos, as well as small snakes. Breeding takes place from December to March, and clutches of up to 11 eggs are laid; the eggs incubate three to four months, depending on the average temperature. Hatchlings are about 5 in long, but grow quickly.
