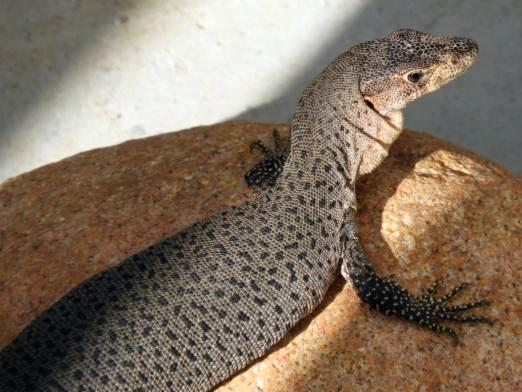

Conservation status
- Least Concern (IUCN 3.1)

Scientific classification
- Kingdom: Animalia
- Phylum: Chordata
- Class: Reptilia
- Order: Squamata
- Suborder: Anguimorpha
- Family: Varanidae
- Genus: Varanus
- Subgenus: Odatria
- Species: V. semiremex

Binomial name
- Varanus semiremex Peters, 1869

= Rusty monitor =

Species of lizard

The rusty monitor (Varanus semiremex) is a small species of monitor lizard. It is endemic to Queensland, Australia.

The species is semiaquatic and primarily inhabits wetlands, especially mangroves, as well as the shores of islands. Its diet consists mainly of insects, fish, crabs, frogs and smaller lizards.
