= Varanus citrinus =

Scientific classification
- Kingdom: Animalia
- Phylum: Chordata
- Class: Reptilia
- Order: Squamata
- Suborder: Anguimorpha
- Family: Varanidae
- Genus: Varanus
- Subgenus: Odatria
- Species: V. citrinus

Binomial name
- Varanus citrinus Pavón-Vázquez, Esquerré, Fitch, Maryan, Doughty, Donnellan, & Keogh. 2022

Species of lizard

Varanus citrinus is a species of monitor lizard in the family Varanidae. The species is endemic to Australia.
