= Walter Auffenberg =

American biologist (1928–2004)

- Born: February 6, 1928; Detroit, Michigan, US
- Died: January 17, 2004 (aged 75); Gainesville, Florida
- Scientific career
- Fields: zoology, herpetology, paleontology

Walter Auffenberg (February 6, 1928 – January 17, 2004) was an American biologist who spent almost 40 years in field research, studying reptile and amphibian paleontology and the systematics and biology of numerous reptile species, including alligators and Komodo dragons.

== Early life ==
Auffenberg was born in Detroit, Michigan, in 1928. After graduating high school, he relocated to DeLand, Florida, to work on two small citrus groves owned by his parents. Shortly after, he enlisted in the US Navy and trained as a Hospital Corpsman in Corpus Christi, Texas. Upon his discharge he returned to Florida and attended Stetson University in DeLand, receiving his Bachelor of Science in zoology in 1951. He moved to Gainesville, Florida, to obtain his advanced degrees at the University of Florida.

== Academic life ==
Auffenberg received his M.Sc. from the University of Florida in 1953 with his thesis A Study of Geographic Morphological Variation in the Blacksnake. He held a temporary position as Curator of Vertebrate Paleontology at The Charleston Museum in 1954 and a Special Student in Paleontology at Harvard University in 1955–56; obtaining his doctoral degree at the University of Florida in 1956. He wrote his dissertation on the fossil snakes of Florida.

In 1959 he and his family moved to Boulder, Colorado, to assist his former adviser, Arnold Grobman to start up the innovative and popular high school science program Biological Sciences Curriculum Study (BSCS). Missing time in the field, Auffenberg returned to Gainesville, Florida, the University of Florida in 1963 to assume the role of Chairman of the Natural Sciences Department and Curator of Herpetology at the Florida Museum of Natural History (then the Florida State Museum). He remained as chairman until 1971 when he stepped down to concentrate on research.

Auffenberg retired as Curator of Herpetology in 1991 and was named Emeritus Distinguished Service Professor/Curator.

In 1969, Auffenberg and his family moved to Komodo Island for 11 months where Auffenberg could study the Komodo dragon in its natural habitat. During their stay, Auffenberg, his family and his assistant Putra Sastrawan captured and tagged more than 50 Komodo dragons. The research from the Auffenberg expedition would prove to be influential in the future propagation of Komodo dragons in captivity.

Auffenberg authored over 130 books and papers during his lifetime, including his work on the herpetology of Pakistan, which produced one of the world's largest collections of reptiles and amphibians from Pakistan. He is most famous for The Behavioral Ecology of the Komodo Monitor in 1981, for which he received the Best Wildlife Book Award from The Wildlife Society. Several living and fossil species, including the peacock monitor (Varanus auffenbergi) were named for him. Advances in Monitor Research II, the proceedings of a symposium on monitor lizards held in 1997, is dedicated to Auffenberg "in recognition of his outstanding contributions to monitor lizard biology".

== Books ==
- Auffenberg, Walter (1981). The Behavioral Ecology of the Komodo Monitor. Gainesville: University Presses of Florida, A University of Florida Book. p. 406. ISBN 0-8130-0621-X.
- Auffenberg, Walter (1988). Gray's Monitor Lizard. Gainesville: University Presses of Florida, University of Florida Press. p. 419. ISBN 0-8130-0841-7.
- Auffenberg, Walter (1994). The Bengal Monitor. Gainesville: University Press of Florida. p. 494. ISBN 0-8130-1295-3.
