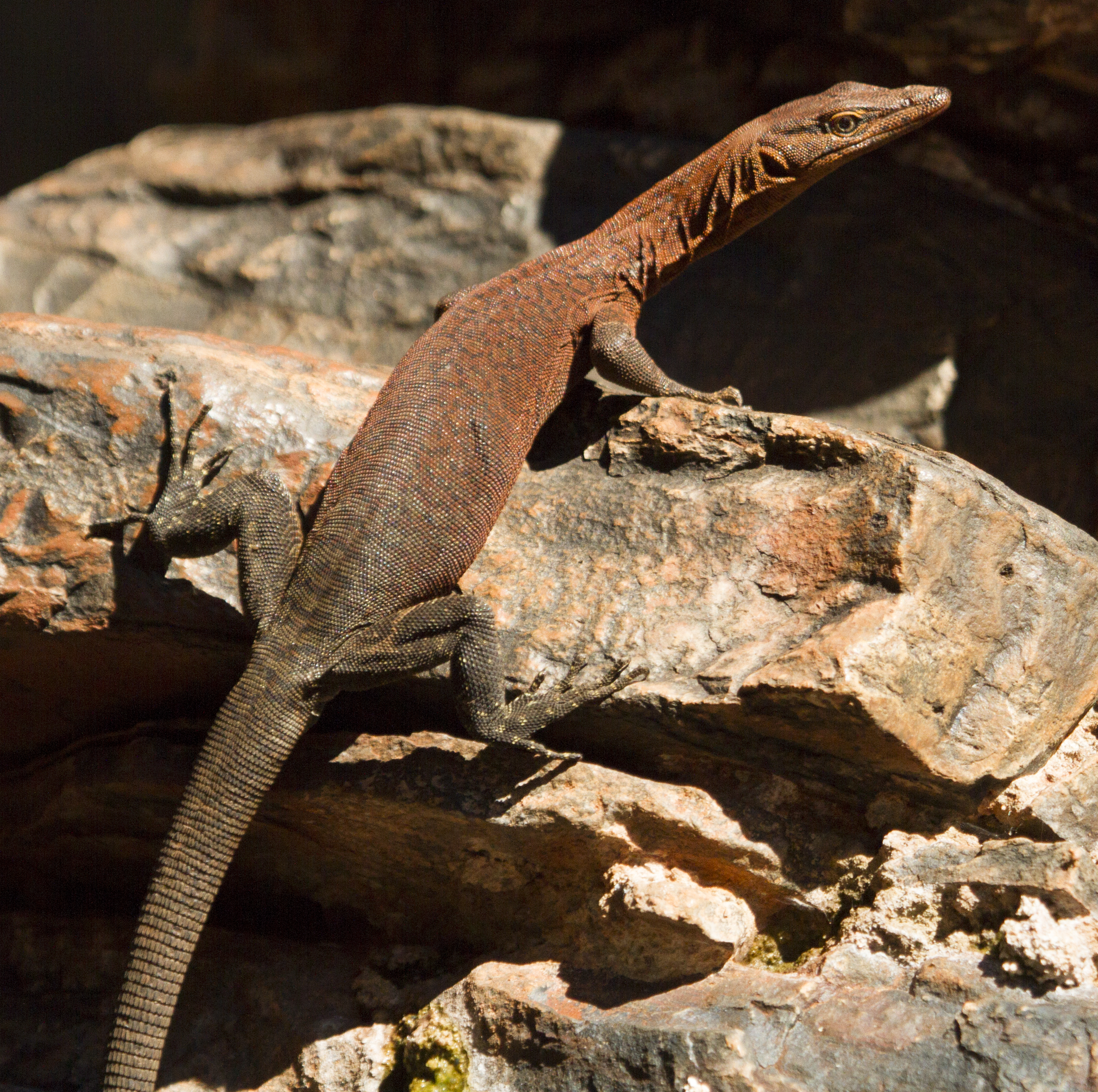

Conservation status
- Least Concern (IUCN 3.1)

Scientific classification
- Kingdom: Animalia
- Phylum: Chordata
- Class: Reptilia
- Order: Squamata
- Suborder: Anguimorpha
- Family: Varanidae
- Genus: Varanus
- Subgenus: Odatria
- Species: V. hamersleyensis

Binomial name
- Varanus hamersleyensis Maryan, Oliver, Fitch & O'Connell, 2014

= Southern Pilbara rock goanna =

Species of lizard

The Southern Pilbara rock goanna (Varanus hamersleyensis), also known as the Hamersley Range rock monitor, is a dwarf member of the family Varanidae.

== Taxonomy ==
The first description of the species emerged from analysis of rock monitors found in the Pilbara region in the north-west of Australia, published in 2014. The study found distinction in coloration and molecular variation that indicated divergence in the southern group that justified separation from Varanus glauerti as a new species. The holotype is a specimen collected in the Hamersley Range in 2003 and previously assigned to the sister species, this was compared to other specimens and redescribed in the 2014 paper. All known specimens are from favoured habitat in the southern regions of the Pilbara, around the Hamersley range; the specific epithet hamersleyensis refers to this region.

== Description ==
A species of Varanus somewhat resembling V. glauerti, found to north, although darker, with whitish eye-spot markings at the upper surface. The body is a slender and moderately small sized varanid, with a snout to vent length of fewer than 160 millimetres and tail length that may exceed twice this length.

== Distribution and habitat ==
The species is restricted to rocky and steep terrain of the Hamersley Range of Western Australia. They are associated with a variety of vegetation, often eucalyptus trees and clumps of spinifex, on banded ironstone formations with deep gorges and steep cliff-faces. Individual range is restricted by high fidelity to their local habitat type.
