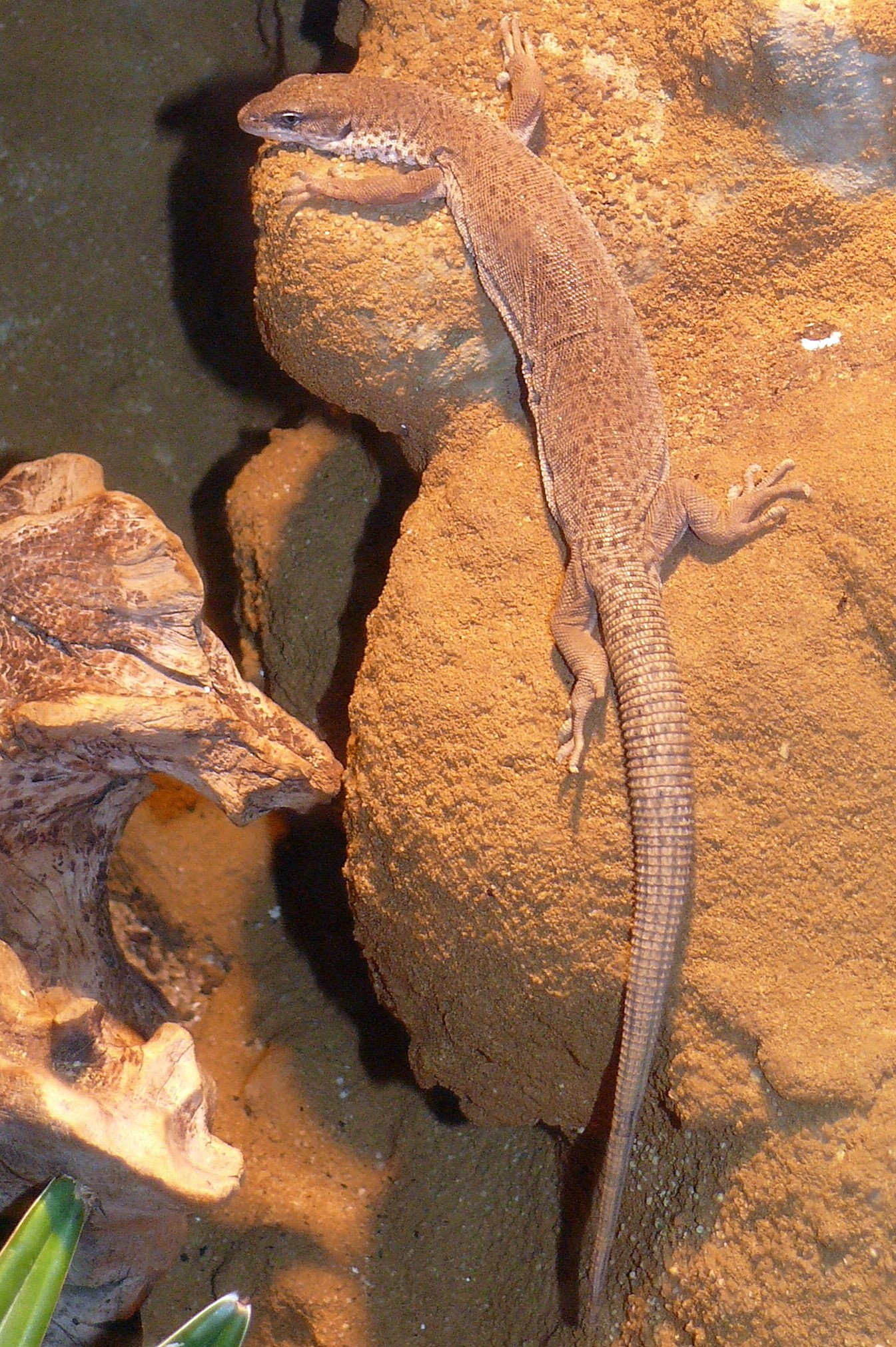

Conservation status
- Least Concern (IUCN 3.1)

Scientific classification
- Kingdom: Animalia
- Phylum: Chordata
- Class: Reptilia
- Order: Squamata
- Suborder: Anguimorpha
- Family: Varanidae
- Genus: Varanus
- Subgenus: Odatria
- Species: V. caudolineatus

Binomial name
- Varanus caudolineatus Boulenger, 1885
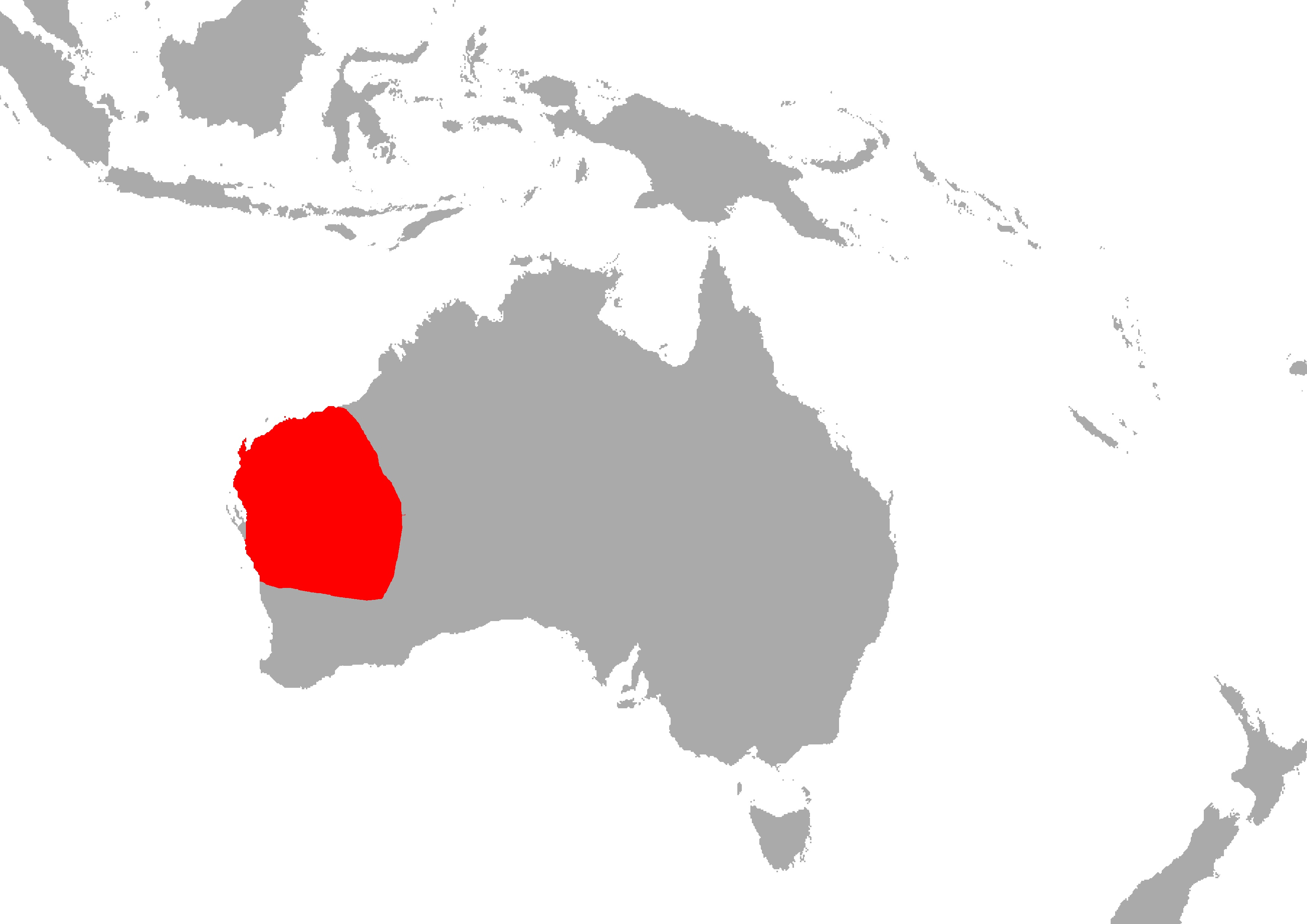

= Stripe-tailed goanna =

Species of lizard

The stripe-tailed goanna (Varanus caudolineatus), also known as the line-tailed pygmy monitor, is a semi-arboreal species of monitor lizard native to Western Australia.

== Description ==
They can grow up to 32 cm in total length but reach sexual maturity at around 9.1 cm in snout to vent length. There is no sexual dimorphism; males and females look identical and are not known to differ in size. It is sometimes confused for the slightly larger pygmy mulga monitor; this is further complicated by the fact that northern populations of this species grow larger and particularly resemble pygmy mulga monitors.

== Distribution ==
They can be further distinguished from the pygmy mulga monitor based on their distribution as the two species are allopatric; stripe-tailed goannas only occur in Western Australia while pygmy mulga monitors can be found in much of central Australia. Although, while their known range does not currently overlap, additional sampling may prove otherwise. Its favoured habitats are grasslands, woodlands, and shrublands, and it appears to inhabit a wide range of habitats dominated by acacia and spinifex. They can be found wedged under the crevices of loose bark, hollows in mulga and eucalyptus trees, and rock outcrops.

== Diet ==
This species feeds on small arthropods mostly including roaches, grasshoppers, spiders, scorpions, and more seldom centipedes, beetles, cicadas, and moths. Smaller lizards are also eaten, especially geckos such as Gehyra punctata, Gehyra variegata and Rhynchoedura ornata. Geckos too large to be killed may still be attacked in order to consume their autotomized tails. While it is arboreal, much of its food is found by foraging on the ground, sometimes entering burrows looking for prey.

== Behaviour ==
This species is relatively sedentary, only becoming active during the hottest time of the day when temperatures reach 30-45C, and even then travelling only a short (for a monitor of this size) average distance of 34m from their tree. They will occupy the same tree for about 3 days, but may not leave it for up to 15 days.

It displays a degree of sociability as well. As many as 4 individuals can be found in close association of an area of 500m^{2}, and individuals, at least between males and female, can be very tolerant of each other.

Breeding likely takes place in July and August, after which females lay a clutch of 4-5 eggs between November and December.

== Predation ==
It is predated on by birds of prey, snakes, as well as larger monitors such as Gould's monitors.
