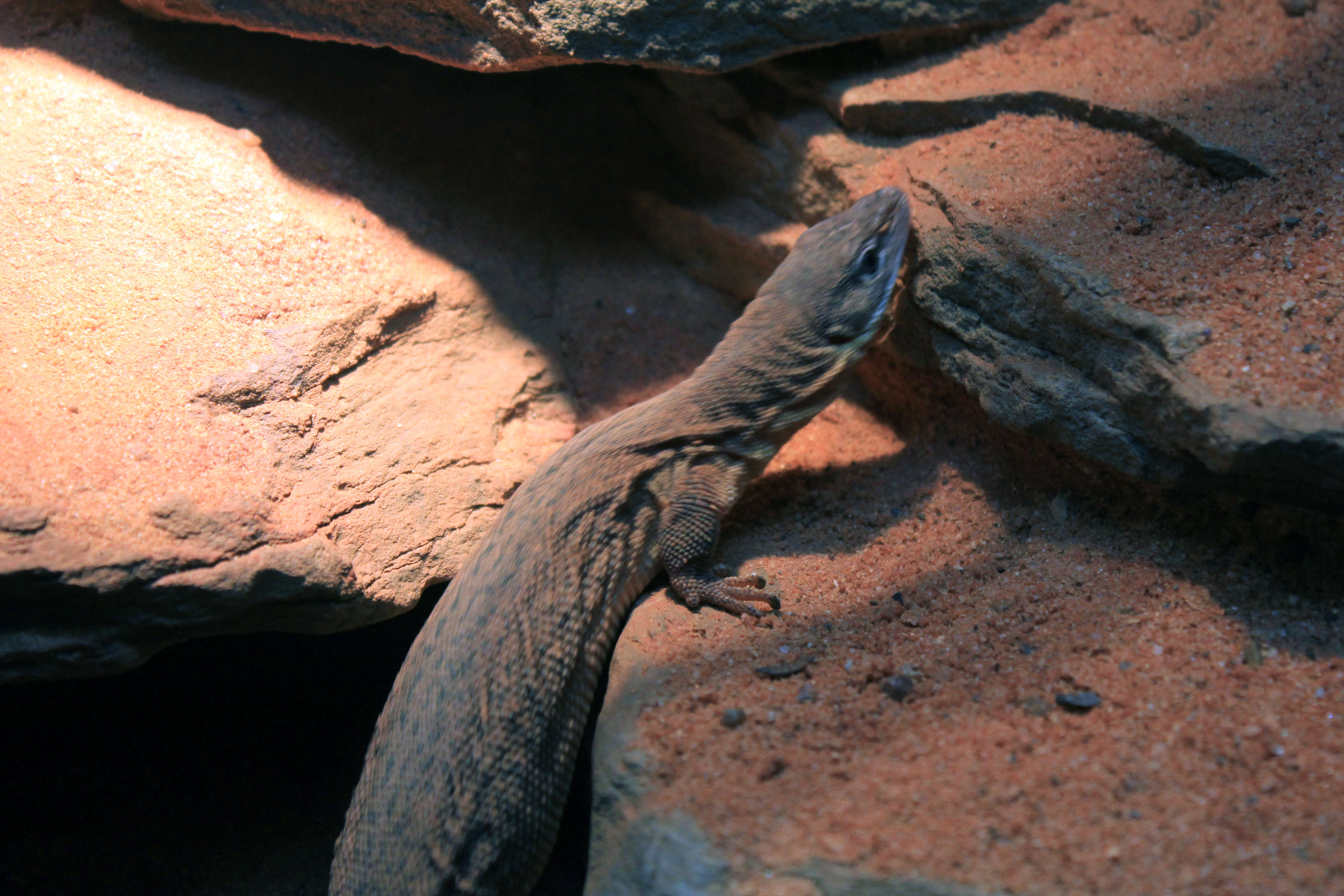
- Varanus storri

Conservation status
- Least Concern (IUCN 3.1)

Scientific classification
- Kingdom: Animalia
- Phylum: Chordata
- Class: Reptilia
- Order: Squamata
- Suborder: Anguimorpha
- Family: Varanidae
- Genus: Varanus
- Subgenus: Odatria
- Species: V. storri

Binomial name
- Varanus storri Mertens, 1966

= Varanus storri =

Species of lizard

Storr's monitor (Varanus storri) is a species of monitor lizard in the family Varanidae. The species is endemic to Australia.

== Etymology ==
The specific name, storri, is in honor of Australian herpetologist Glen Milton Storr.

== Geographic range and habitat ==
Varanus storri is found in the seasonal tropical regions of Australia, specifically in rocky environments. V. storri storri is found in eastern Australia, from Charters Tower to the Queensland, whereas V. storri ocreatus is predominantly located in Western Australia and the Northern Territory. Thus, both subspecies are found in the same climate and alike habitats. They can be found in open woodland, grasslands, spinifex, and rocky areas.

== Description ==
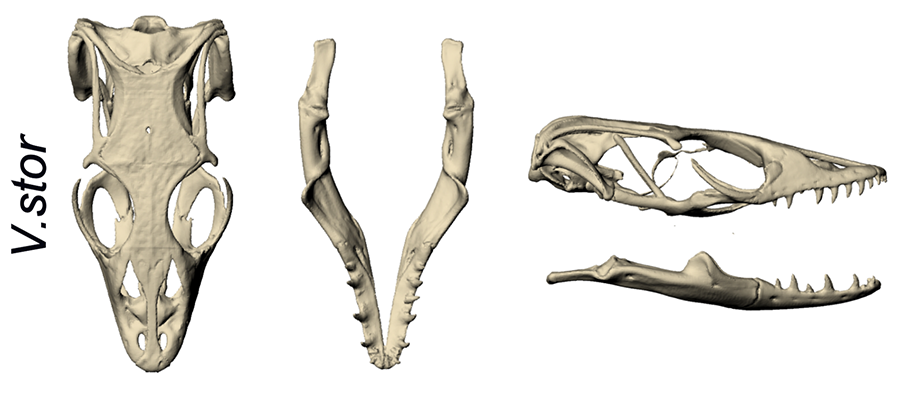
Skull

The species V. storri is smaller and duller colored than the similar looking spiny-tailed monitor (V. acanthurus). V. storri grows up to just over 40 cm (1.3 ft) in total length. V. s. ocreatus has a longer tail and limbs than V. s. storri; the former's tail is 1.6 times longer than its snout to vent length while the latter has a tail that is only 1.4 times longer. V. s. ocreatus also has enlarged scales on the bottom of the end of its hindlegs.

The species does not display sexual dimorphism, and even the cluster of spiny scales on either sides of the male's vent in many other Odatria species is present in both sexes of Storr's monitor.

== Behavior ==
The species V. storri is terrestrial, and is even less arboreal than the related spiny-tailed monitor.

The species lives in colonies in the wild, and as many as 50 animals may live together in a 0.75 km^{2} area, although each individual inhabits its own U-shaped burrow under a large rock or spinifex. Individuals sometimes wave their tails at each other. V. storri is most active between February and March, and between July and November, during mornings and late afternoons, retreating to its burrow during the hottest time of the day; unlike larger monitors, it remains active during cooler parts of the day with exception of the cold winter months.

Although previously reported to change color with increasing temperature, the subspecies of V. storri were found to neither change color nor absorb solar radiation between 15–35 °C (59–95 °F) in later studies.

== Reproduction ==
In V. storri sexual maturity is attained by the time it is 9 cm (3.5 in) long in snout-to-vent length (SVL). Enlarged testes chiefly occur in November, the late dry and early wet season, but do occur throughout the year. Similarly, breeding takes place throughout the year as well. Up to 6 eggs are laid, which are incubated at 27–29 °C (81–84 °F) for 100–129 days. Sexual maturity can be attained 18 months later.

== Diet ==
Varanus storri preys on invertebrates especially orthopterans, but also ants, beetles and spiders. It also feeds on lizards such as skinks and geckos. Its diet is seasonal, and large fat reserves are built up through most of the year in order to last through the winter months when it becomes inactive.
