= Varanus ocreatus =

Scientific classification
- Kingdom: Animalia
- Phylum: Chordata
- Class: Reptilia
- Order: Squamata
- Suborder: Anguimorpha
- Family: Varanidae
- Genus: Varanus
- Subgenus: Odatria
- Species: V. ocreatus

Binomial name
- Varanus ocreatus Storr, 1980

Species of lizard

Storr's monitor (Varanus ocreatus) is a medium-sized species of monitor lizard in the family Varanidae. The species is native to Western Australia and the Northern Territory in Australia. It belongs to the subgenus Odatria.
