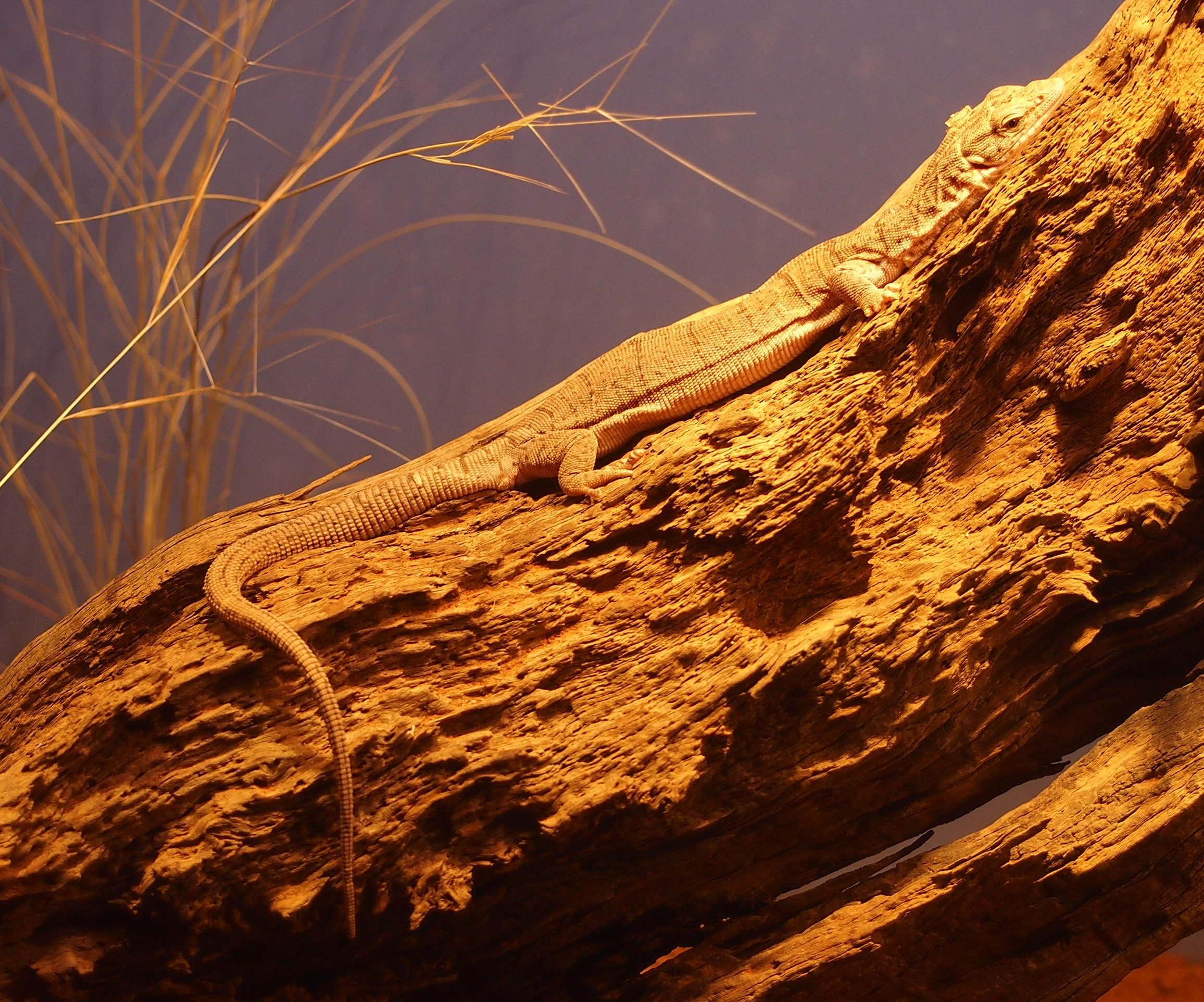
- Alice Springs Desert Park

Conservation status
- Least Concern (IUCN 3.1)

Scientific classification
- Kingdom: Animalia
- Phylum: Chordata
- Class: Reptilia
- Order: Squamata
- Suborder: Anguimorpha
- Family: Varanidae
- Genus: Varanus
- Subgenus: Odatria
- Species: V. gilleni

Binomial name
- Varanus gilleni Lucas & C. Frost, 1895

Synonyms
- Varanus gilleni Lucas & C. Frost, 1895; Worrellisaurus gilleni — Wells & Wellington, 1985; Varanus (Odatria) gilleni — Hörenberg & Koch, 2013

= Pygmy mulga monitor =

Species of lizard

The pygmy mulga monitor (Varanus gilleni), also known commonly as Gillen's monitor or just the mulga monitor, is a species of lizard in the family Varanidae. The species is endemic to Australia.

== Taxonomy and etymology ==
The original description of the species V. gilleni was presented to the Royal Society of Victoria in 1895 by Arthur H. S. Lucas and Charles Frost.

The specific name, gilleni, is in honor of Australian anthropologist Francis James Gillen.

== Geographic distribution and habitat ==
V. gilleni is native to the spinifex sandplains of northwestern and central Australia. It can be found under the loose bark of desert she-oaks, and the hollows of eucalyptus, mulga, and myall trees.

== Description ==
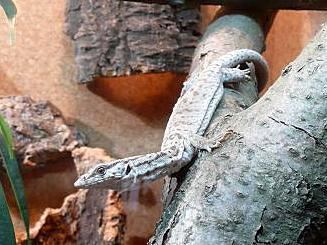
In a vivarium

The pygmy mulga monitor is arboreal, with a prehensile tail. It grows to a total length (including tail) of around 40 cm (16 inches). The upper surface is brown, grading to grey at the sides. The nostrils are positioned on the sides of the muzzle, about halfway between the tip of the snout and the eye. V. gilleni weighs, on average, 60–80 grams (2.1–2.8 oz). Males and females can be distinguished by the presence of spines on the sides of the male's vent.

It is sometimes mistaken for the stripe-tailed goanna, but the two species are allopatric and can be physically distinguished by the pygmy mulga monitor's slightly larger size.

This species has very high endurance, owing to it having one of the highest factorial aerobic scopes of any vertebrate. A study where individuals were placed on treadmills running at a speed of 1 kilometre per hour (28 cm per second) found that they could maintain the speed for "many minutes" without tiring.

It is particularly well adapted to arid conditions, losing water at half the rate of other Australian monitor species.

== Diet ==
Although an arboreal lizard, much of the prey of V. gilleni is found by foraging on the ground. Pygmy mulga monitors eat primarily spiders, orthopterans, beetles, and other lizards, especially geckos such as Gehyra variegata and Heteronotia binoei. Geckos too large to be killed may be attacked anyway to consume their autotomized tails. Bird eggs, small mammals, and even ant-sized prey are also taken.

== Reproduction ==
Ritualized fighting sometimes occurs between males of V. gilleni. Unlike larger monitors which grapple with each other while standing on their hindlegs, they grapple each other with all four limbs, belly to belly, and roll around on the ground trying to force the other onto its back. Biting may also occur.

Breeding likely takes place between September and October. A clutch of up to seven eggs may be laid in a burrow that is 30 cm (12 in) deep, which may then be sealed with sand. The eggs hatch after three months.

== Predators ==
The species V. gilleni is predated on by birds of prey, snakes, and larger monitors such as Gould's monitors.
