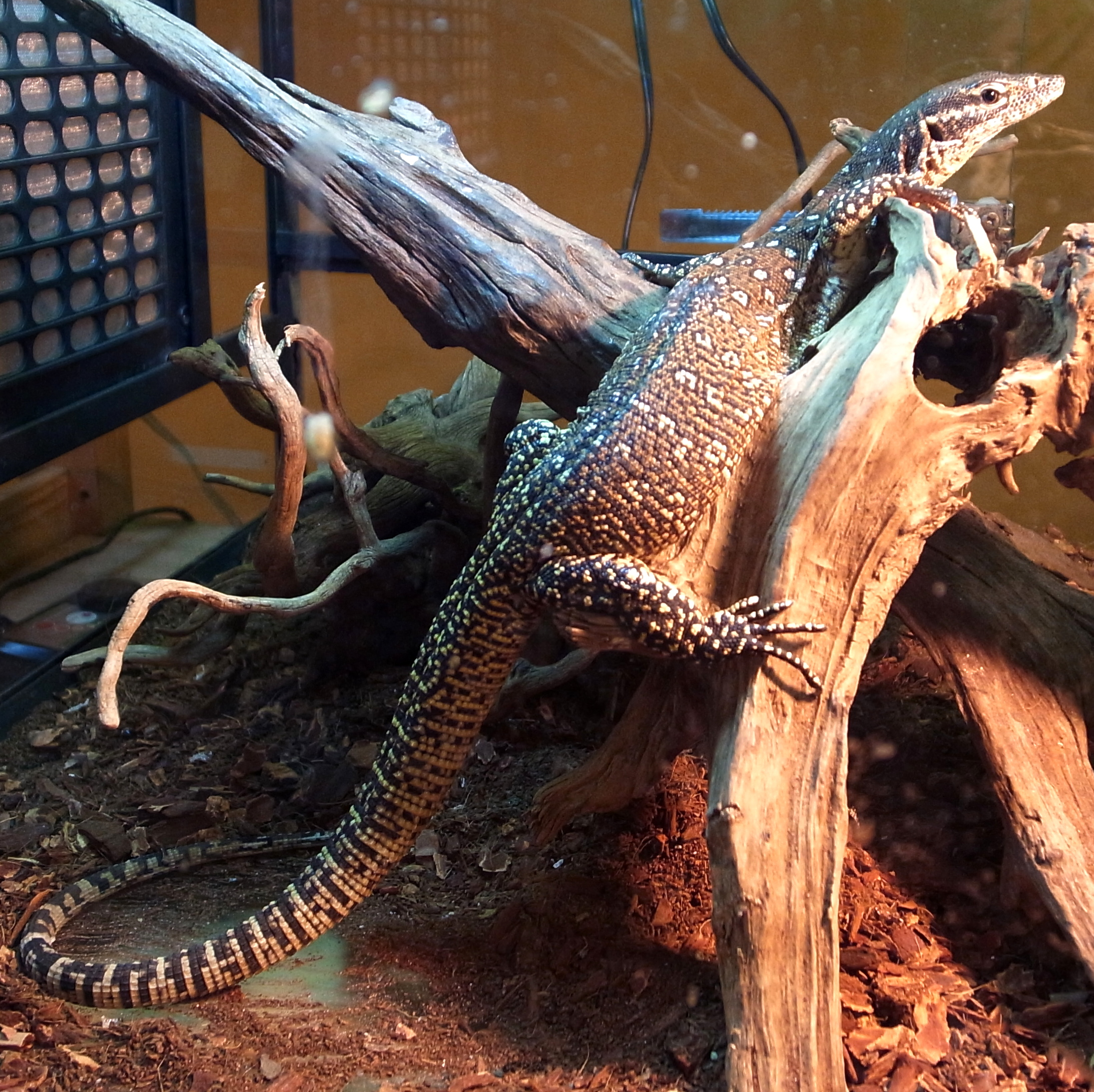

Conservation status
- Endangered (IUCN 3.1)

Scientific classification
- Kingdom: Animalia
- Phylum: Chordata
- Class: Reptilia
- Order: Squamata
- Suborder: Anguimorpha
- Family: Varanidae
- Genus: Varanus
- Subgenus: Odatria
- Species: V. auffenbergi

Binomial name
- Varanus auffenbergi Sprackland, 1999
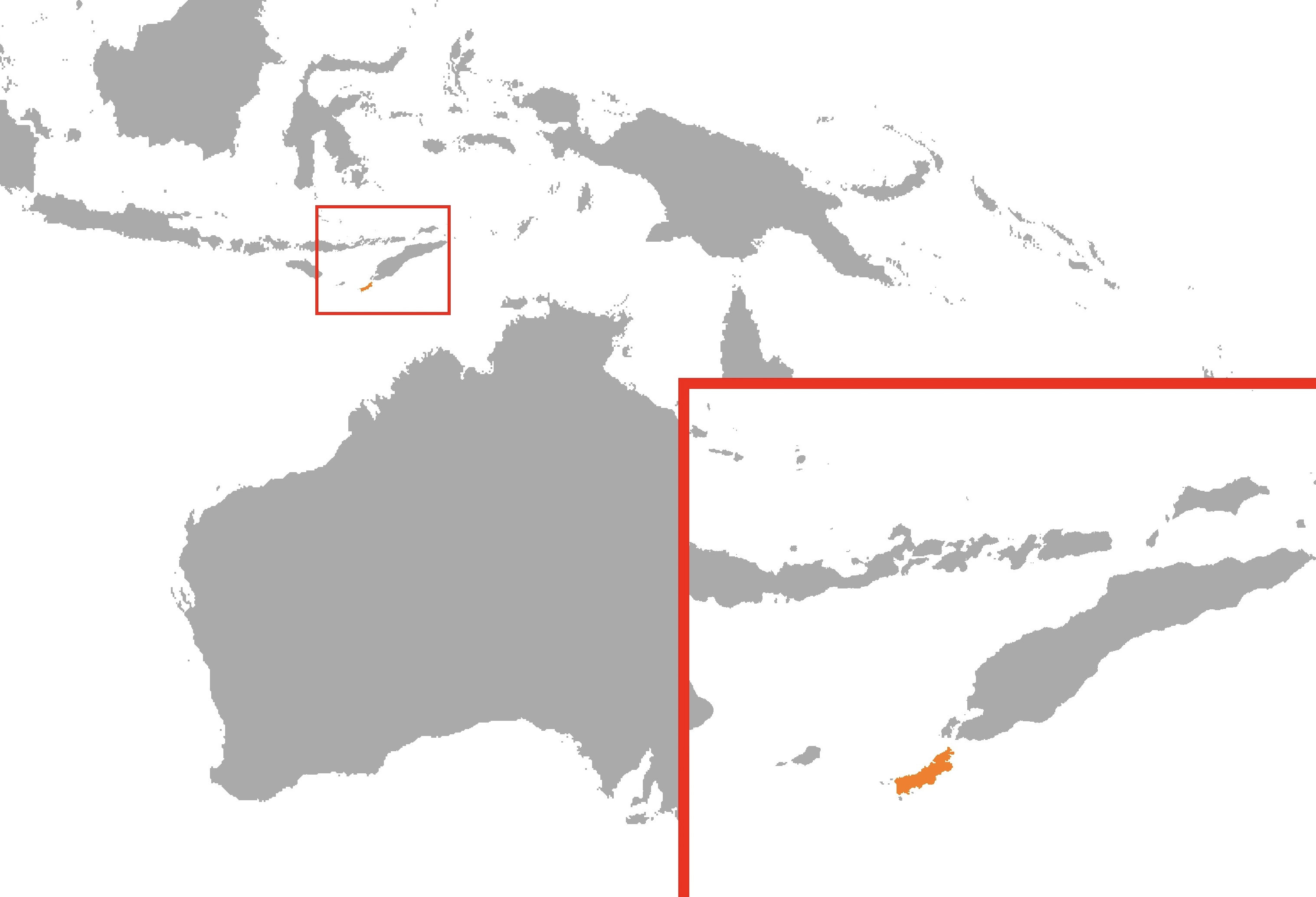

= Peacock monitor =

Species of lizard

The peacock monitor (Varanus auffenbergi), also known commonly as Auffenberg's monitor, is a species of small monitor lizard in the family Varanidae. The species, which belongs to the subgenus Odatria, is endemic to Rote Island, Indonesia.

== Etymology ==
The generic name Varanus is derived from the Arabic word waral ورل, (alternative spelling waran= "lizard"). The name comes from a common semitic root ouran, waran, or waral, meaning "lizard". The occasional habit of varanids to stand on their two hind legs and to appear to "monitor" their surroundings may have led to this name, as it was Latinized into Varanus. The specific name auffenbergi honors US herpetologist Walter Auffenberg.

== Description ==
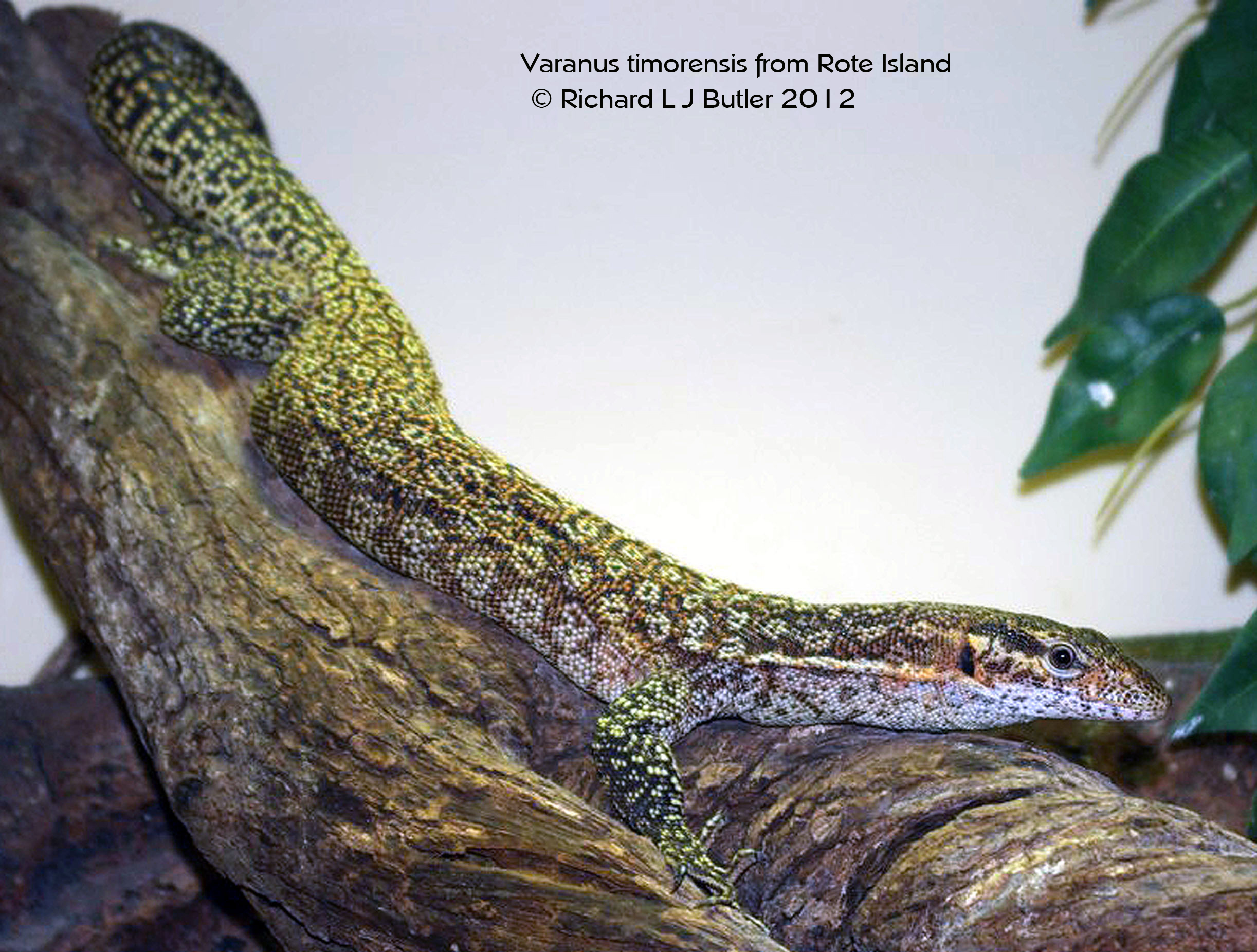
Adult male from Rote Island. (Despite the caption, it is a peacock monitor, as it is from Rote Island)

The peacock monitor is one of the smaller monitor lizards, usually reaching a length of 60 cm (23.5 in). It is similar to the Timor monitor (V. timorensis), with some differentiation in the underside coloring and patterns. The coloring patterns fade as these lizards reach adulthood. The peacock monitor has blue-grey ocelli, whereas the Timor monitor has cream-colored ocelli.

== Behavior ==
In the wild, peacock monitors have been seen climbing the trunks of palms and then basking on the crowns of the trees. The peacock monitor is calm and shy compared to other monitor lizards, remaining shy even in captivity.

== External links and further reading ==
- Sprackland RG (1999). "New species of monitor (Squamata: Varanidae) from Indonesia". Reptile Hobbyist 4 (6): 20–27. (Varanus auffenbergi, new species).
- JCVI.org (Downloaded Feb. 10, 2010.)
- Varanaus.nl (Downloaded Feb. 10, 2010.)
- ITIS.gov (Downloaded Feb.11, 2010)
- Museumstuff.com (Downloaded Feb.11, 2010)
- Wesiak K (2008). "Unterbringung, Pflege und Nachzucht von Varanus (Odatria) auffenbergi SPRACKLAND 1999 [=Housing, care and breeding of Varanus (Odatria) auffenbergi SPRACKLAND 1999]". Elaphe 16 (1): 37–47. (in German).
- Green, Brian; King, Dennis (1999). Monitors : The Biology of Varanid Lizards, 2nd ed. Malabar: Krieger Publishing Company.
- King, Ruth Allen; Pianka, Eric R.; King, Dennis (2004). Varanoid Lizards of the World. Bloomington: Indiana University Press. pp. 225–229. ISBN 0-253-34366-6.
- King, Dennis & Green, Brian. (1999). Goannas: The Biology of Varanid Lizards. University of New South Wales Press. ISBN 0-86840-456-X
- Behavior video on YouTube
