= Charles Frost (naturalist) =

Australian author and reptile collector (c. 1853 – 1915)

Charles Frost (c. 1853 – 1915) was an Australian author and collector of reptiles, frequently associated with the works of Arthur Henry Shakespeare Lucas.

== Biography ==
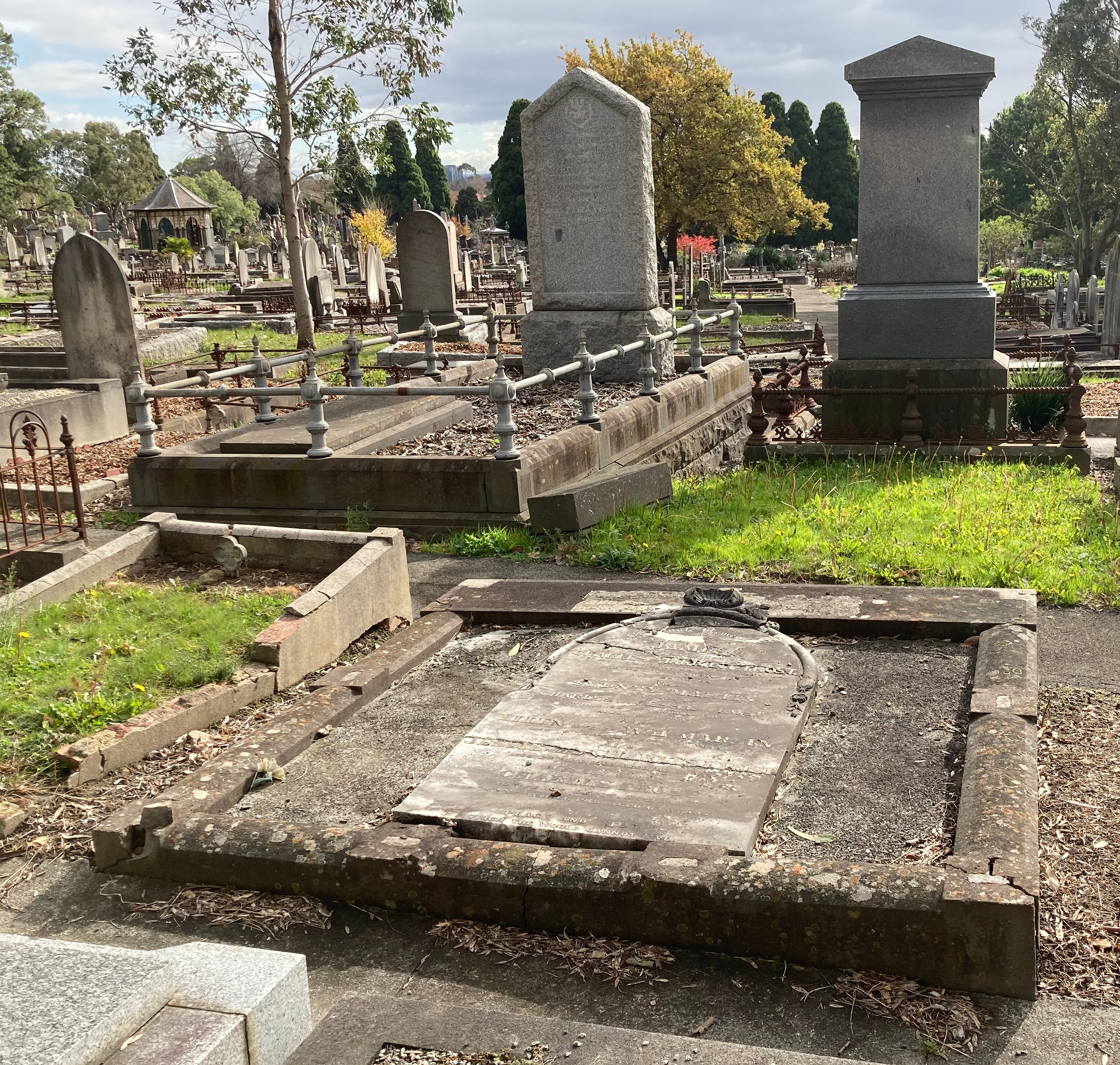
Frost's grave at Boroondara General Cemetery

An account of the biographical details of Frost's life were published as an anonymous obituary.

== Works ==
Frost published descriptions of new taxa with the more well known author Arthur Henry Shakespeare Lucas and undertook collecting expeditions to obtain specimens of reptiles, birds and spiders. Most of the publications and work Frost undertook was through societies in Victoria, although he is absent from membership of the Royal Society of Victoria. He had no formal education in the natural sciences, however, Frost was a member of the Linnean Society and used the post-nominal F.L.S. in his published works. As co-author he assisted in compiling catalogues and descriptions of reptiles that became standard sources for the contemporary research of herpetology. He was the sole author of several short works, including two papers in 1888 and 1890 on the results of his experiments on the toxicity of Latrodectus species in Victoria, known as the red-back spider, prompted by claims of T. S. Ralph in his presentation on the New Zealand Latrodectus katipo at an earlier meeting of the Victorian Naturalist Society.

The author maintained collections of specimens until his death, when they were donated to a museum; the specimens were not labelled with the important information concerning the locality in which they were collected. His name is commemorated in the scientific names of the lizard Lerista frosti and the frog Philoria frosti.
