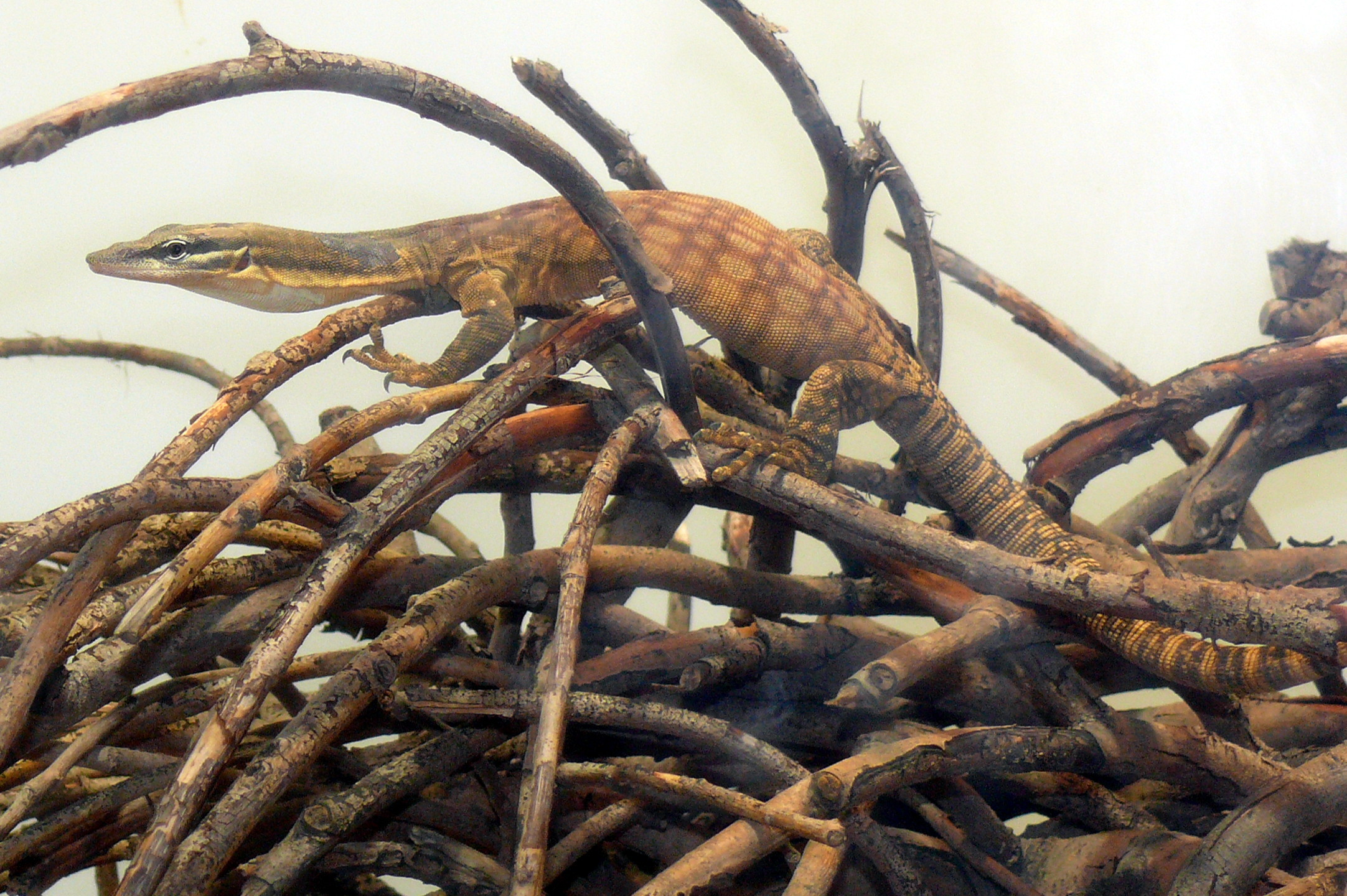
- Varanus glauerti male

Conservation status
- Least Concern (IUCN 3.1)

Scientific classification
- Kingdom: Animalia
- Phylum: Chordata
- Class: Reptilia
- Order: Squamata
- Suborder: Anguimorpha
- Family: Varanidae
- Genus: Varanus
- Subgenus: Odatria
- Species: V. glauerti

Binomial name
- Varanus glauerti Mertens, 1957

Synonyms
- Varanus (Odatria) timorensis glauerti Mertens, 1957; Varanus (Odatria) glauerti — Mertens, 1958; Varanus glauerti — Cogger, 1983

= Kimberley rock monitor =

Species of lizard

The Kimberley rock monitor (Varanus glauerti) is a medium-sized species of monitor lizard in the family Varanidae. The species is native to Northern Australia. Also known commonly as Glauert's monitor, Quinkan rock monitor and the Kakadu sand goanna, it belongs to the subgenus Odatria.

== Etymology ==
The specific name, glauerti, is in honor of English-born Australian herpetologist Ludwig Glauert.

== Geographic range ==
V. glauerti is found in the extreme northwestern part of the Australian state of Western Australia, and in the northern tip of Northern Territory.

== Description ==
V. glauerti grows up to 80 cm (31 in) long, and three-quarters of its length is the long tail.

== Habitat and behaviour ==
V. glauerti lives almost exclusively on rocky cliff faces, but is also found in humid forests. It is rupicolous, and prefers humid conditions.

== Diet ==
V. glauerti preys upon insects such as caterpillars, cockroaches, and orthopterans, and also upon small lizards such as geckos and their eggs.

== Reproduction ==
V. glauerti is oviparous, and sometimes parthenogenetic.

== Gallery ==
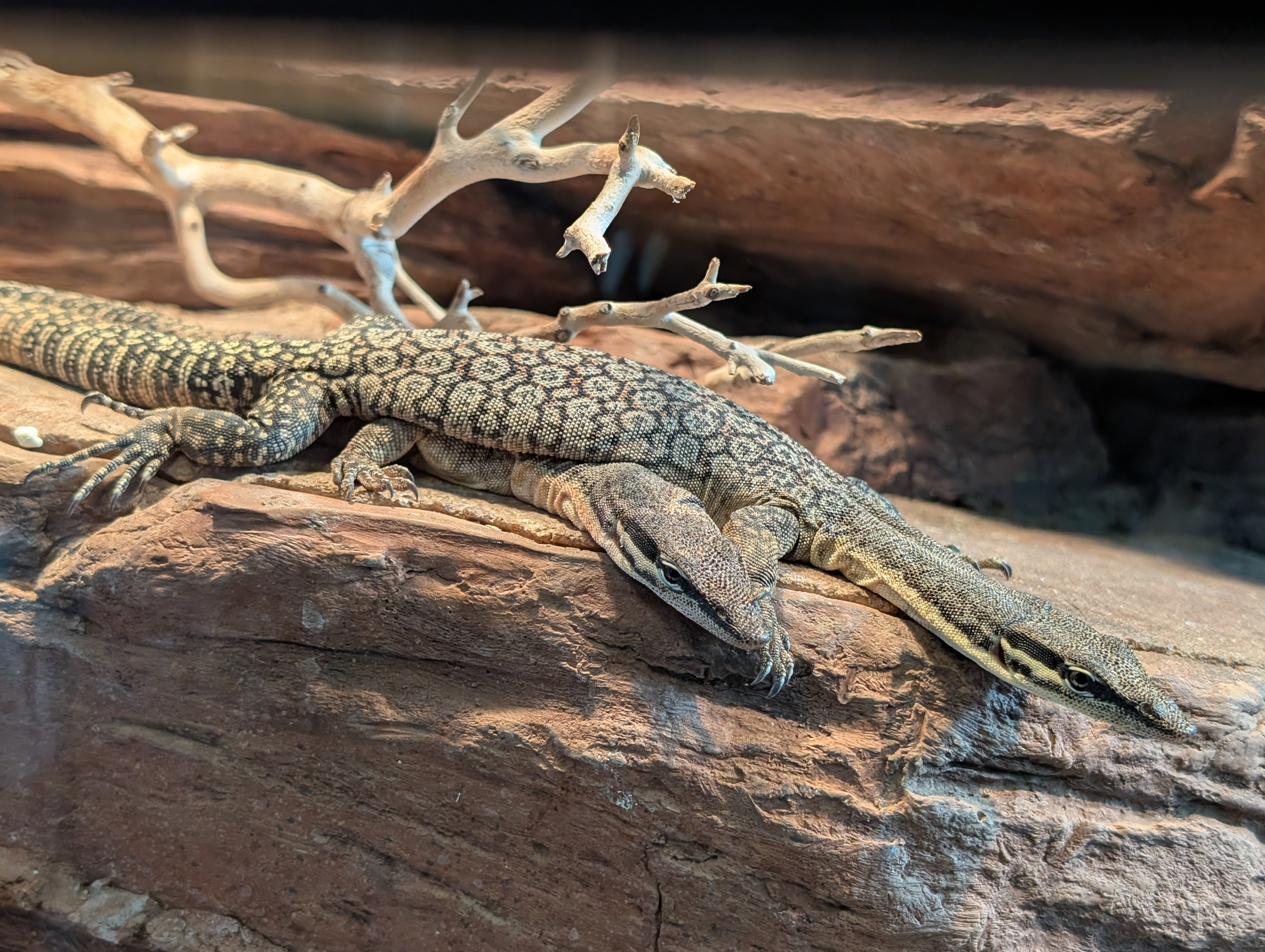
Bronx Zoo, New York

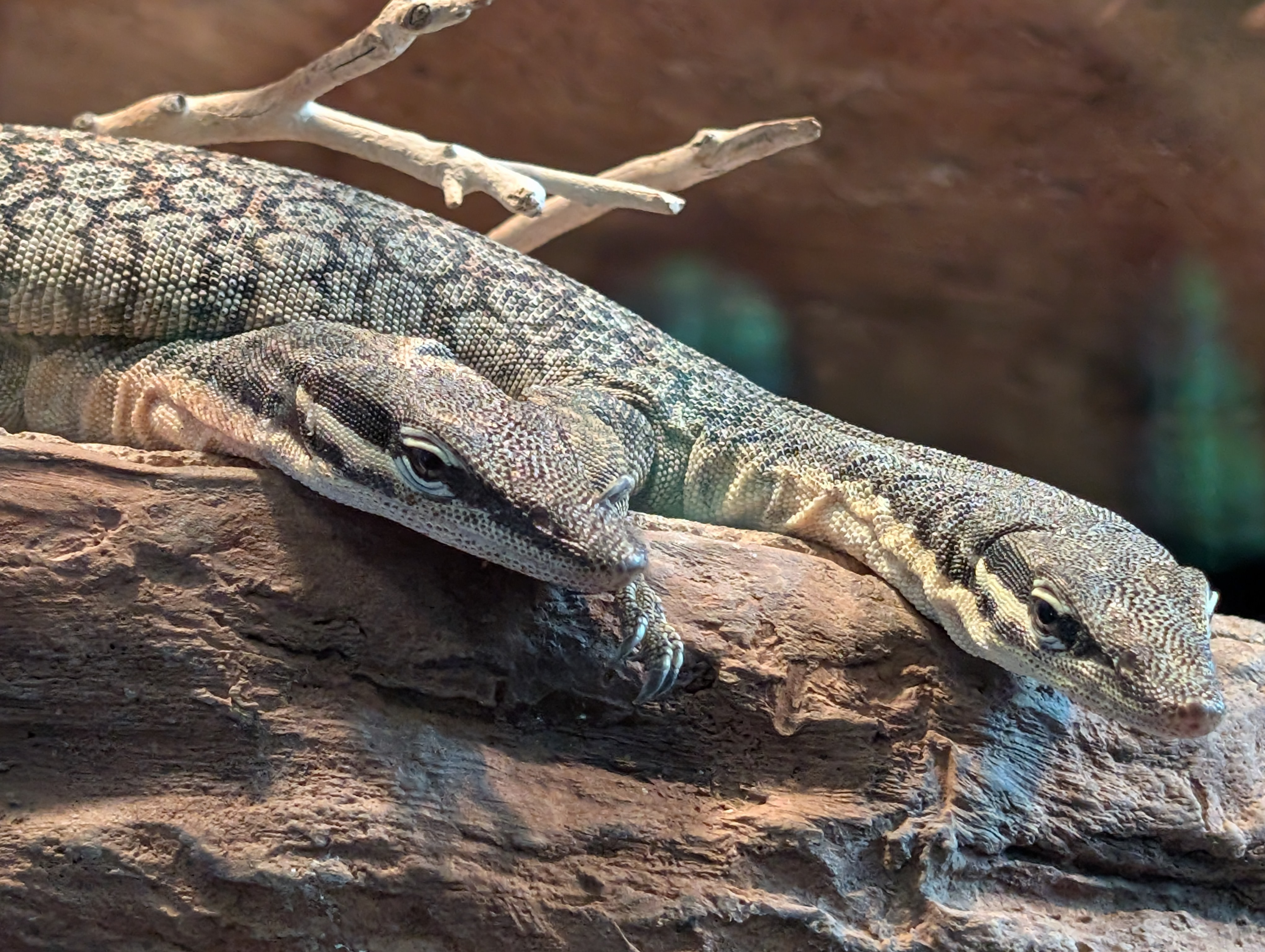
Bronx Zoo, New York
