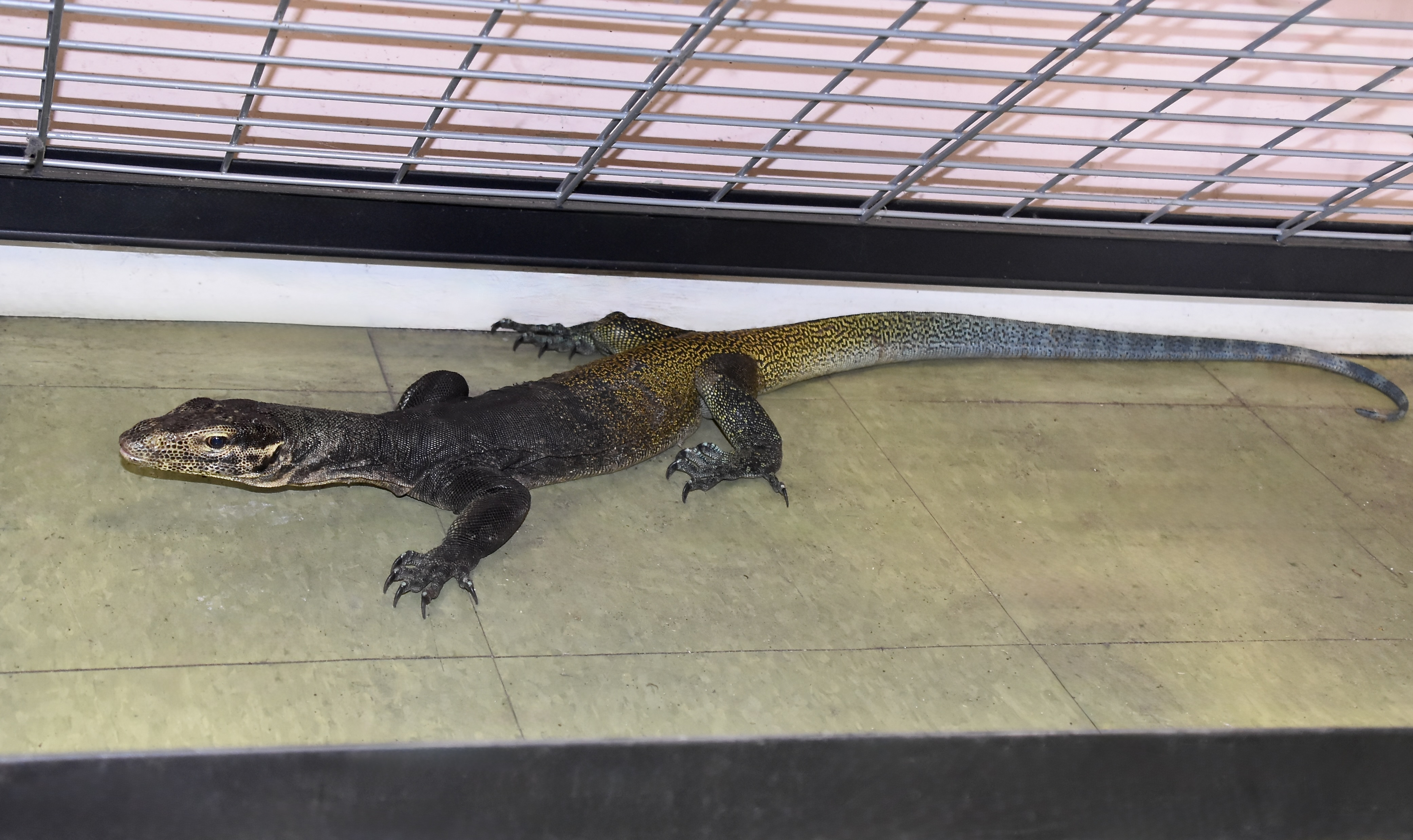
- A tricolor monitor (Varanus yuwonoi) in a reptile store, Scales ‘N Tails in North Las Vegas.
- Vulnerable (IUCN 3.1)

Scientific classification
- Kingdom: Animalia
- Phylum: Chordata
- Class: Reptilia
- Order: Squamata
- Suborder: Anguimorpha
- Family: Varanidae
- Genus: Varanus
- Subgenus: Euprepiosaurus
- Species: V. yuwonoi

Binomial name
- Varanus yuwonoi Harvey & Barker, 1998
- Varanus yuwonoi is endemic to the island of Halmahera

= Varanus yuwonoi =

Species of lizard

Varanus yuwonoi, the tricolor monitor, black-backed mangrove monitor or black-backed monitor, is a species of monitor lizard in the blue-tailed monitor species complex. The tricolor monitor is endemic to the island of Halmahera, in the Maluku Islands, Indonesia.

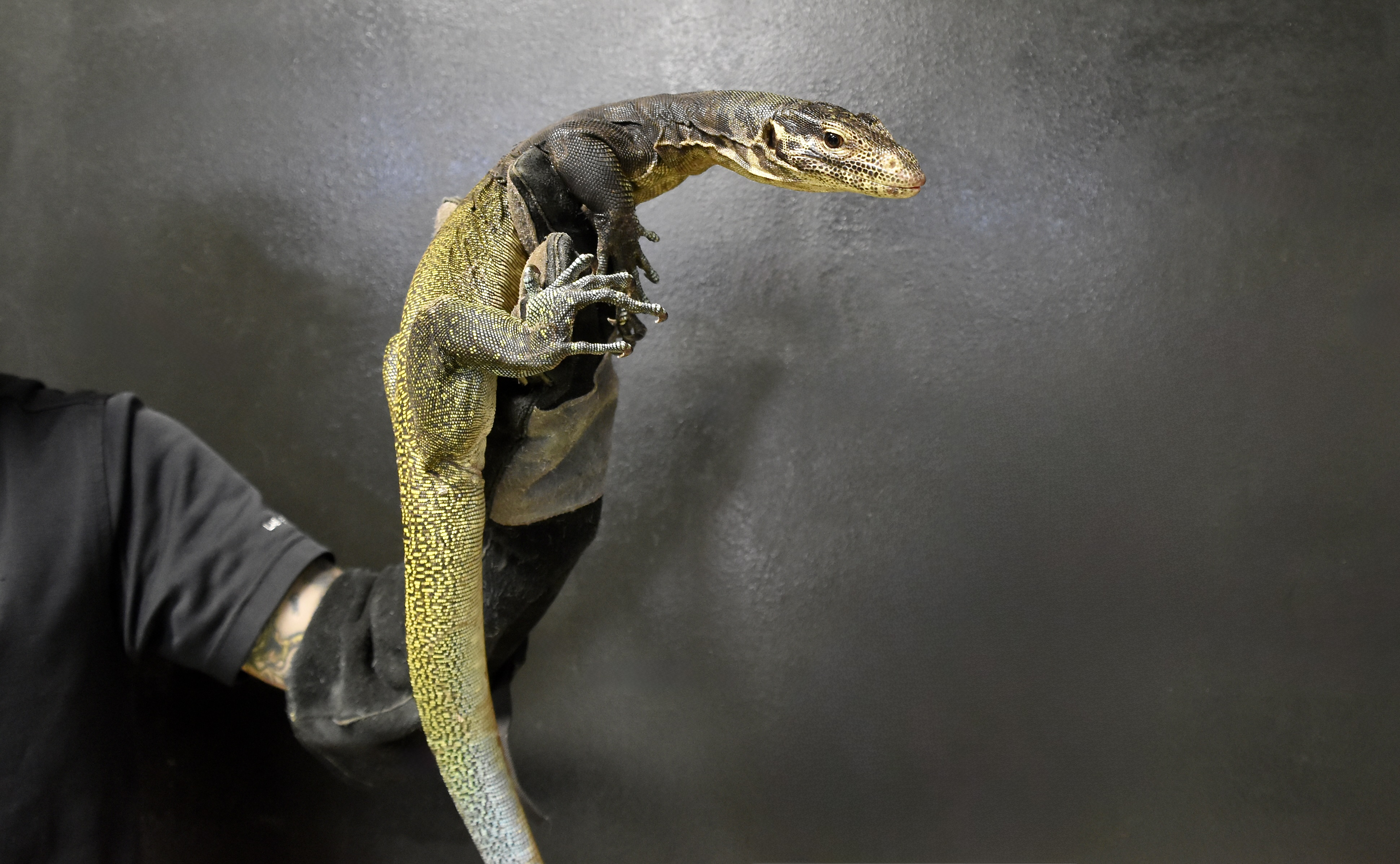
A tricolor monitor (Varanus yuwonoi) being handled.

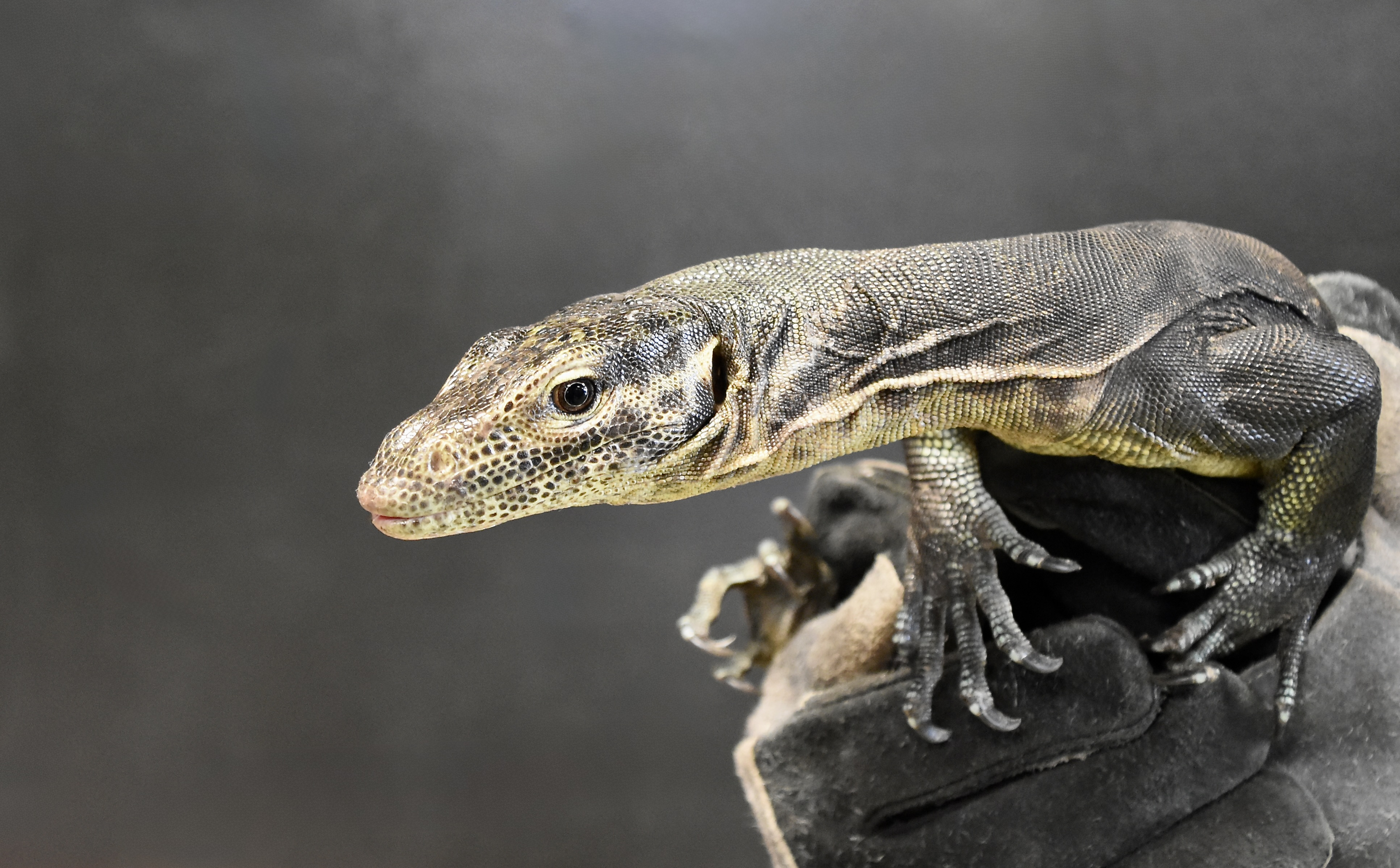
Closeup of a tricolor monitor's face.

== Etymology ==
The specific epithet, yuwonoi, is in honour of Indonesian herpetologist Frank Bambang Yuwono (born 1958).

== Taxonomy ==
The tricolor monitor is a member of the blue-tailed monitor (Varanus doreanus) species complex, which includes species such as the blue-tailed monitor, Finsch's monitor, and the Mussau Island blue-tailed monitor.

== Description ==
The fully mature size of tricolor monitors is currently unknown, owing to the great difficulty of observing this species. The largest individual recorded was 1.46 metres (4.79 feet) in total length (including tail) but was not fully grown.

The species is strikingly colourful, with a bright blue tail and a yellow body. The tongue is also yellow, a shared characteristic of all species in the blue-tailed monitor species complex. The tail is heavily compressed and the teeth are proportionately very long compared to most monitors, even those which it is closely related to.

== Geographic range and habitat ==
Tricolor monitors are endemic to Halmahera Island, and are primarily found in its inland rainforest, where they are sympatric with the turquoise monitor, Rainer Günther's monitor, and possibly the silver monitor.

== Diet ==
Tricolor monitors are carnivorous. They frequent nest mounds excavated by megapodes, which attract smaller birds as well as small reptiles and insects that they may take as prey with their unusually long teeth. They may also consume megapode chicks and are reported to also excavate mounds to eat the eggs inside. This suggests that this species is specialized at ambushing birds.
