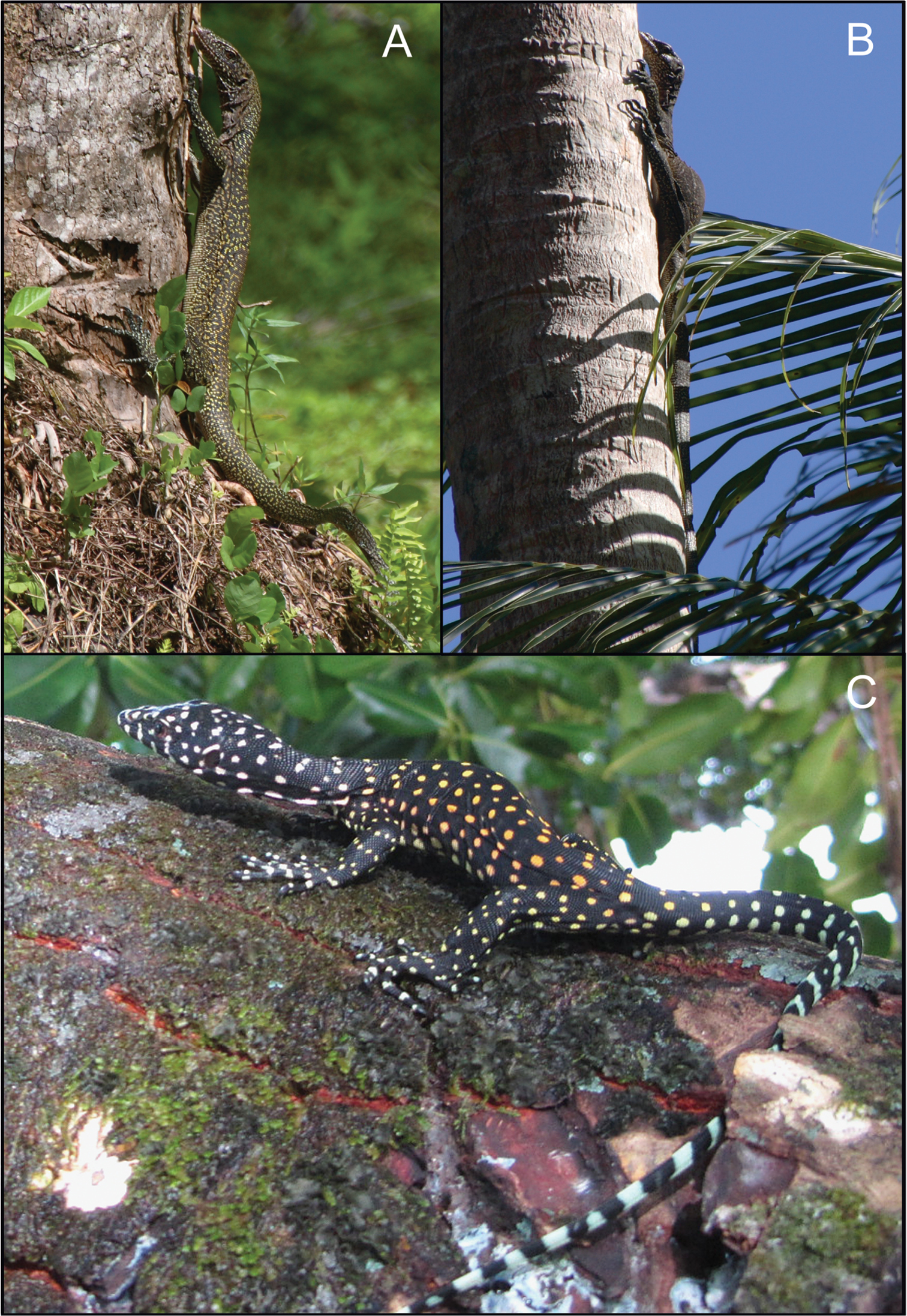

Scientific classification
- Kingdom: Animalia
- Phylum: Chordata
- Class: Reptilia
- Order: Squamata
- Suborder: Anguimorpha
- Family: Varanidae
- Genus: Varanus
- Subgenus: Euprepiosaurus
- Species: V. semotus

Binomial name
- Varanus semotus Weijola, Donnellan & Lindqvist, 2016

= Mussau Island blue-tailed monitor =

Species of lizard

The Mussau Island blue-tailed monitor or Mussau monitor (Varanus semotus) is a species of monitor lizard endemic to Mussau Island in Papua New Guinea. It belongs to the Varanus doreanus species complex.

== Taxonomy ==
The specific name semotus is Latin for "distant" or "remote", in reference to this species being isolated from its closest relatives by several hundred kilometres as it only occurs on Mussau Island.

It is a member of the V. doreanus species complex (V. doreanus, V. finschi, V. semotus, V. yuwonoi).

== Distribution ==
It is endemic to the island of Mussau in Papua New Guinea. Although once likely common throughout Mussau, it is now restricted to a small coastal area of the island due to logging. It is however still common in its current range, where it can be found on palm trees, shrubs, and other dry coastal vegetation. There are unconfirmed reports of this species also occurring on Emirau Island.

== Description ==
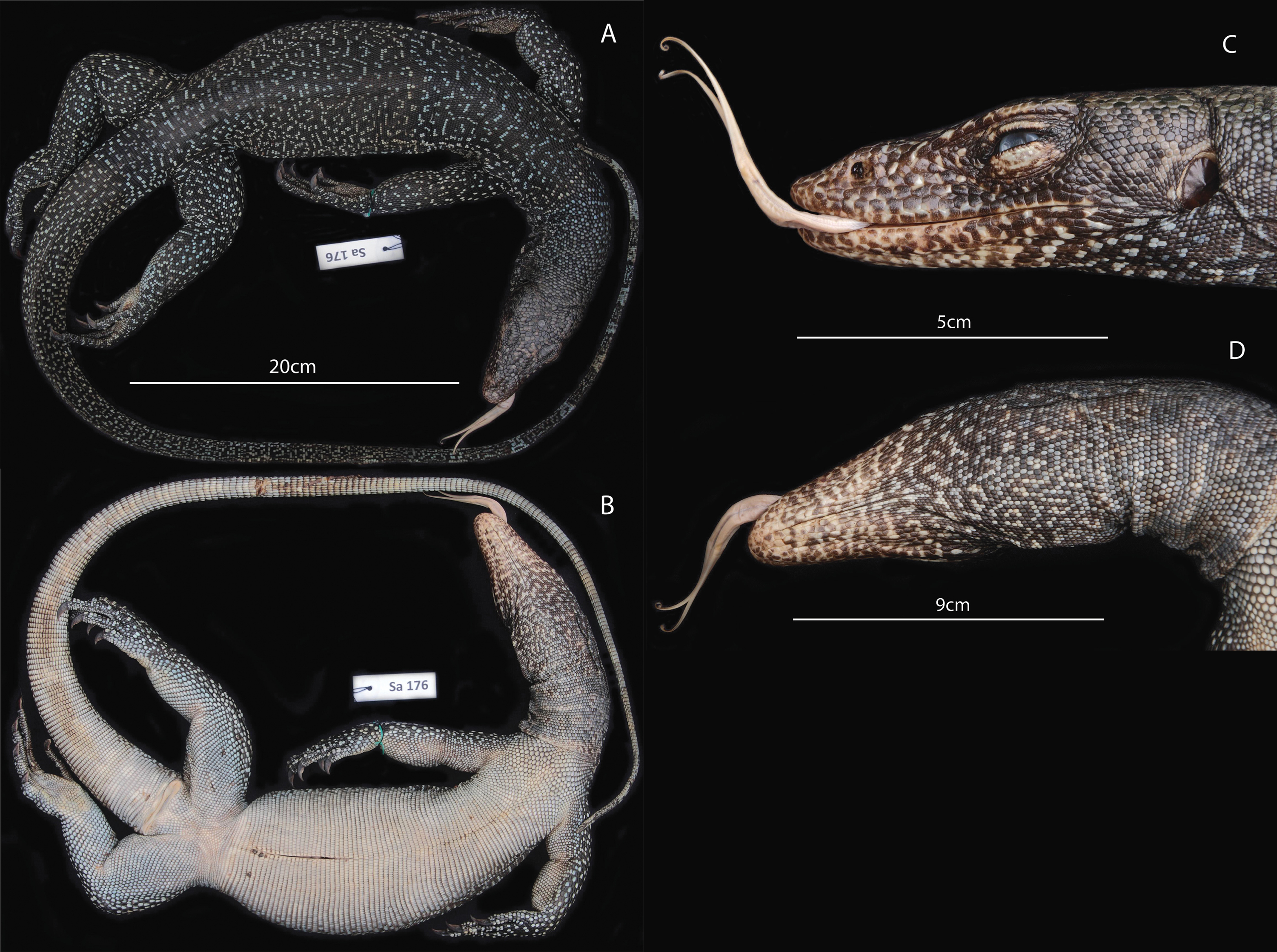

The Mussau Island blue-tailed monitor reaches just over 1 metre in length. It has a pale yellow tongue, which is a shared characteristic of the V. doreanus species complex. It has a marbled black and cream coloured throat and a banded tail with varying levels of blue colouration. Juveniles are black and more strikingly patterned, with white spots on the head, orange spots on the back, and pale green to cream coloured bands on the tail.

== Diet ==
Like other monitors of the V. doreanus species complex, the Mussau Island blue-tailed monitor feeds on a relatively high amount of vertebrate prey, especially when compared to other monitors of the subgenus Euprepriosaurus. It has been reported to feed on skinks, birds, eggs, and crabs.

It is the only large terrestrial generalist predator and scavenger on Mussau Island.
