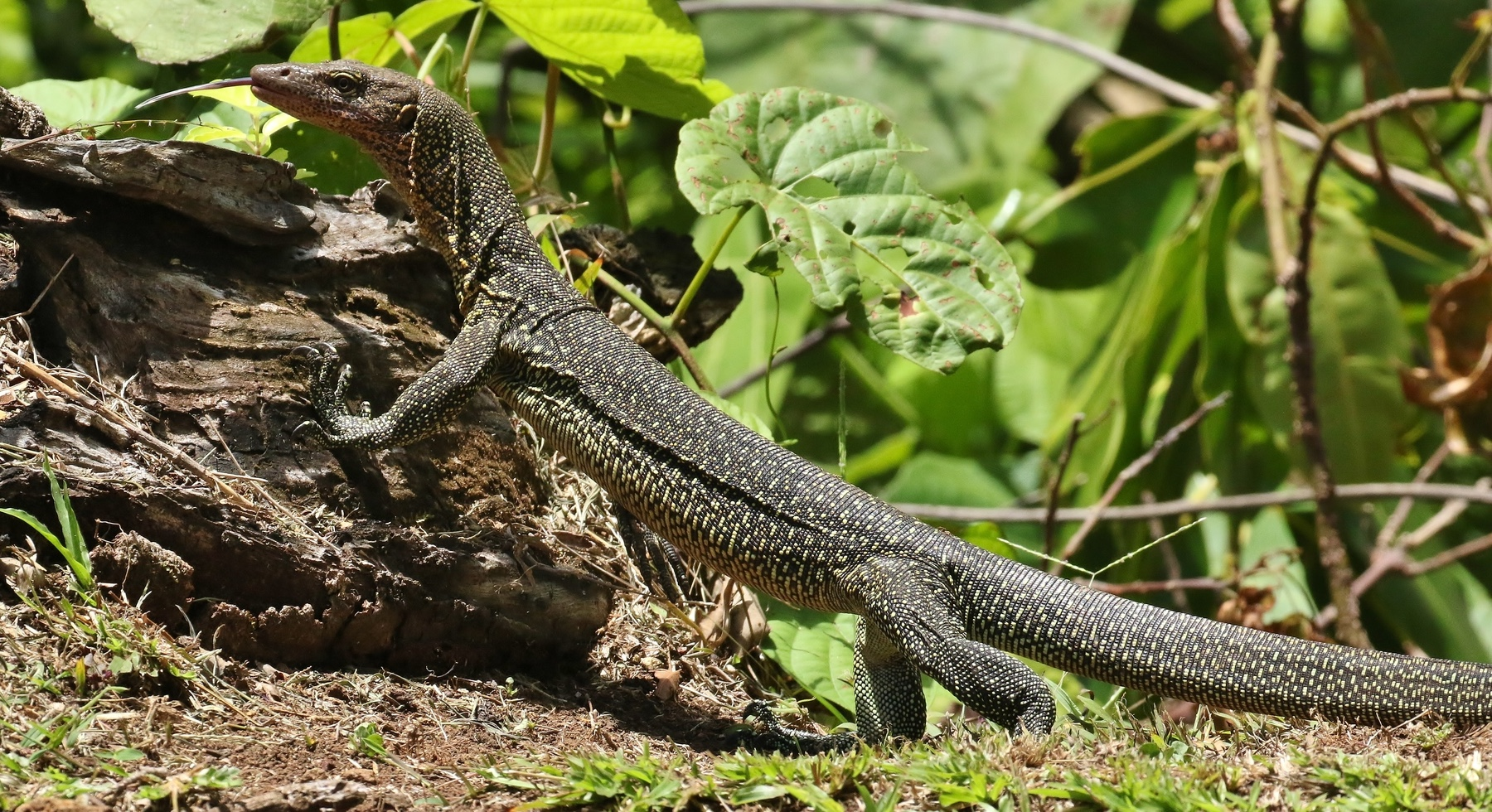
- Bennett's long-tailed monitor (V. bennetti)

Scientific classification
- Kingdom: Animalia
- Phylum: Chordata
- Class: Reptilia
- Order: Squamata
- Suborder: Anguimorpha
- Family: Varanidae
- Genus: Varanus
- Subgenus: Euprepiosaurus

Species
- 20, see text

= Varanus (Euprepiosaurus) =

Subgenus of monitor lizards

Euprepiosaurus is a subgenus of monitor lizards found in the Malay Archipelago and northern Australia, which includes small to medium sized species.

== Classification ==
In 1988, the tree monitors that now form the subgenus Hapturosaurus were instead placed within Euprepriosaurus alongside the mangrove monitors. Nevertheless, there was a distinction between mangrove and tree monitors that was clear even then, so Euprepriosaurus was commonly considered to consist of two species complexes, i.e., the V. indicus complex and the V. prasinus complex. In 2016, Yannick Bucklitsch, Wolfgang Böhme, and André Koch found the two species complexes sufficiently morphologically, ecologically, and biologically distinct, and so all species within the V. prasinus complex were moved under a newly erected subgenus, i.e., Hapturosaurus. Euprepriosaurus and Hapturosaurus diverged from each other during the late Miocene.

=== Species complexes ===
Euprepiosaurus consists of three species complexes:

- V. indicus species complex (V. indicus, V. cerambonensis, V. caerulivirens, V. colei, V. obor, V. lirugensis, V. rainerguentheri, V. zugorum)
- V. doreanus species complex (V. doreanus, V. finschi, V. semotus, V. yuwonoi)
- V. jobiensis species complex (V. jobiensis)

== Species ==
- V. bennetti, Bennett's long-tailed monitor
- V. caerulivirens, turquoise monitor
- V. cerambonensis, Ceram monitor
- V. chlorostigma, mangrove goanna
- V. colei Kei Islands monitor
- V. doreanus, blue-tailed monitor
- V. douarrha, New Ireland monitor
- V. finschi, Finsch's monitor
- V. indicus, mangrove monitor
- V. jobiensis, peach-throated monitor
- V. juxtindicus, Rennell Island monitor
- V. lirungensis, Talaud mangrove monitor
- V. louisiadensis, Louisiade monitor
- V. melinus, quince monitor
- V. obor, sago monitor
- V. rainerguentheri Rainer Günther's monitor
- V. semotus, Mussau Island blue-tailed monitor
- V. tanimbar, Tanimbar monitor
- V. tsukamotoi, Mariana monitor
- V. yuwonoi black-backed mangrove monitor, tricolor monitor
- V. zugorum, silver monitor, Zug's monitor
