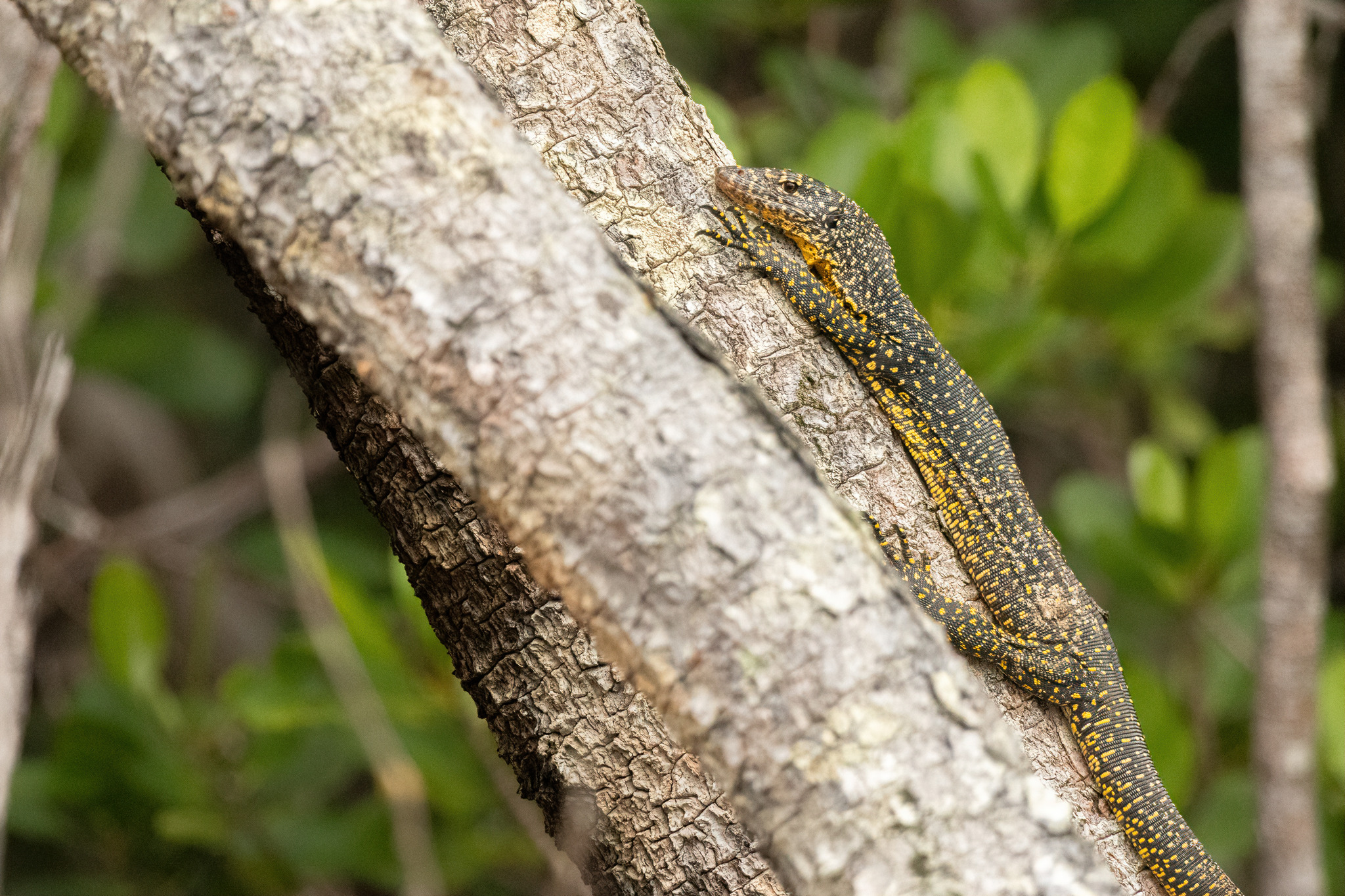

Scientific classification
- Kingdom: Animalia
- Phylum: Chordata
- Class: Reptilia
- Order: Squamata
- Suborder: Anguimorpha
- Family: Varanidae
- Genus: Varanus
- Subgenus: Euprepiosaurus
- Species: V. chlorostigma

Binomial name
- Varanus chlorostigma Gray, 1831

= Varanus chlorostigma =

Species of monitor lizard

Varanus chlorostigma, known commonly as the mangrove goanna or mangrove monitor, is a species of monitor lizard of the subgenus Euprepiosaurus native to northern Australia, Indonesia, Papua New Guinea and the Solomon Islands. It was previously considered conspecific with Varanus indicus before being classified as its own species in 2023.
