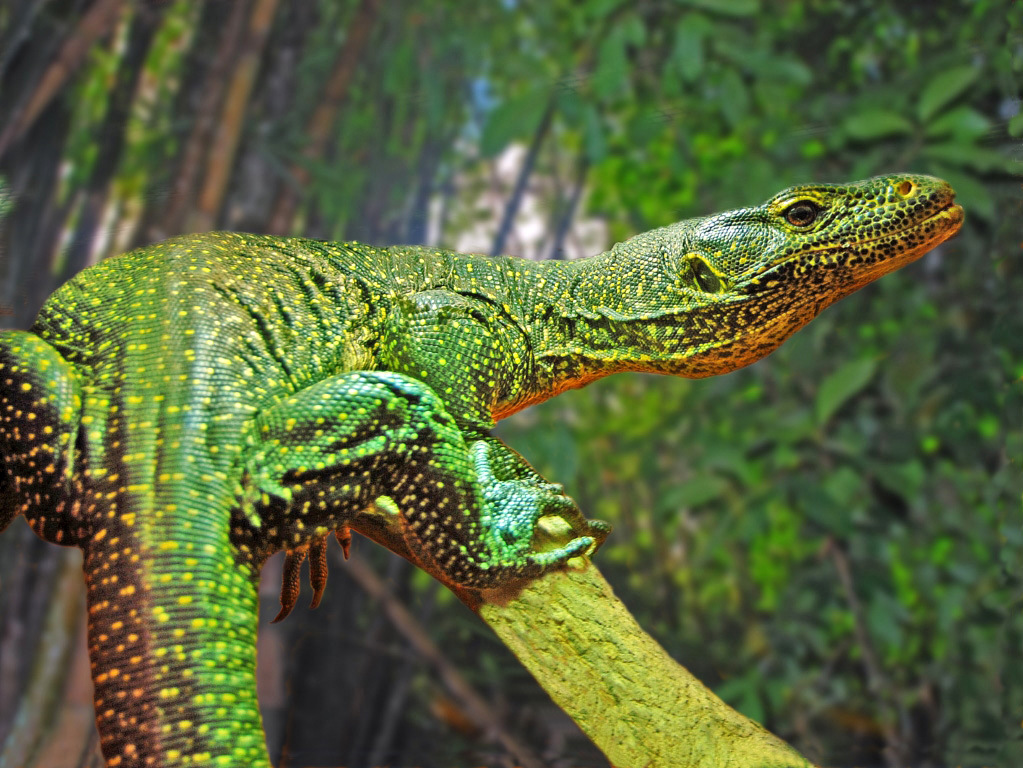

Conservation status
- Least Concern (IUCN 3.1)
- CITES Appendix II

Scientific classification
- Kingdom: Animalia
- Phylum: Chordata
- Class: Reptilia
- Order: Squamata
- Suborder: Anguimorpha
- Family: Varanidae
- Genus: Varanus
- Subgenus: Euprepiosaurus
- Species: V. doreanus

Binomial name
- Varanus doreanus (Meyer, 1874)

Synonyms
- List: Monitor doreanus MEYER 1874; Varanus kalabeck PETERS & DORIA 1878; Varanus kalabeck BOULENGER 1885; Varanus kalabeck DE ROOIJ 1915; Varanus indicus kalabeck MERTENS 1942; Varanus doreanus doreanus BÖHME 1994; Varanus doreanus doreanus DE LISLE 1996; Varanus indicus kalabeck AVALOS & MARTINEZ CARRION 1997; Varanus doreanus AST 2001; Varanus (Euprepiosaurus) doreanus ZIEGLER et al. 2007; Varanus (Euprepiosaurus) doreanus KOCH et al. 2013; Varanus doreanus COGGER 2014; Varanus (Euprepiosaurus) doreanus BUCKLITSCH et al. 2016

= Blue-tailed monitor =

Species of lizard

The blue-tailed monitor, blue-tailed tree monitor or Kalabeck's monitor (Varanus doreanus), is a monitor lizard of the family Varanidae. It belongs to the V. doreanus group of the subgenus Euprepiosaurus.

== Taxonomy ==
Two subspecies have been described:

- V. d. doreanus (Meyer, 1874)
- V. d. finschi (Bohme, Horn & Zeigler, 1994)

The latter has since been elevated to full-species status as Varanus finschi.

Once considered a member of the V. indicus species complex, it now forms its own species complex with V. finschi, V. semotus, and V. yuwonoi, having diverged from the V. indicus species complex 5.8 million years ago. The V. doreanus species complex formed at most 4.1 million years ago. V. doreanus is the most basal and widespread member of this species complex.

== Distribution ==
This species can be found throughout New Guinea, New Britain, the Bismarck Archipelago, Biak, Salawati, and Waigeo. The blue-tailed monitor is also found on mainland Australia on the tip of the Cape York Peninsula. It inhabits rainforest areas, dry streambeds, and riparian zones.

== Description ==
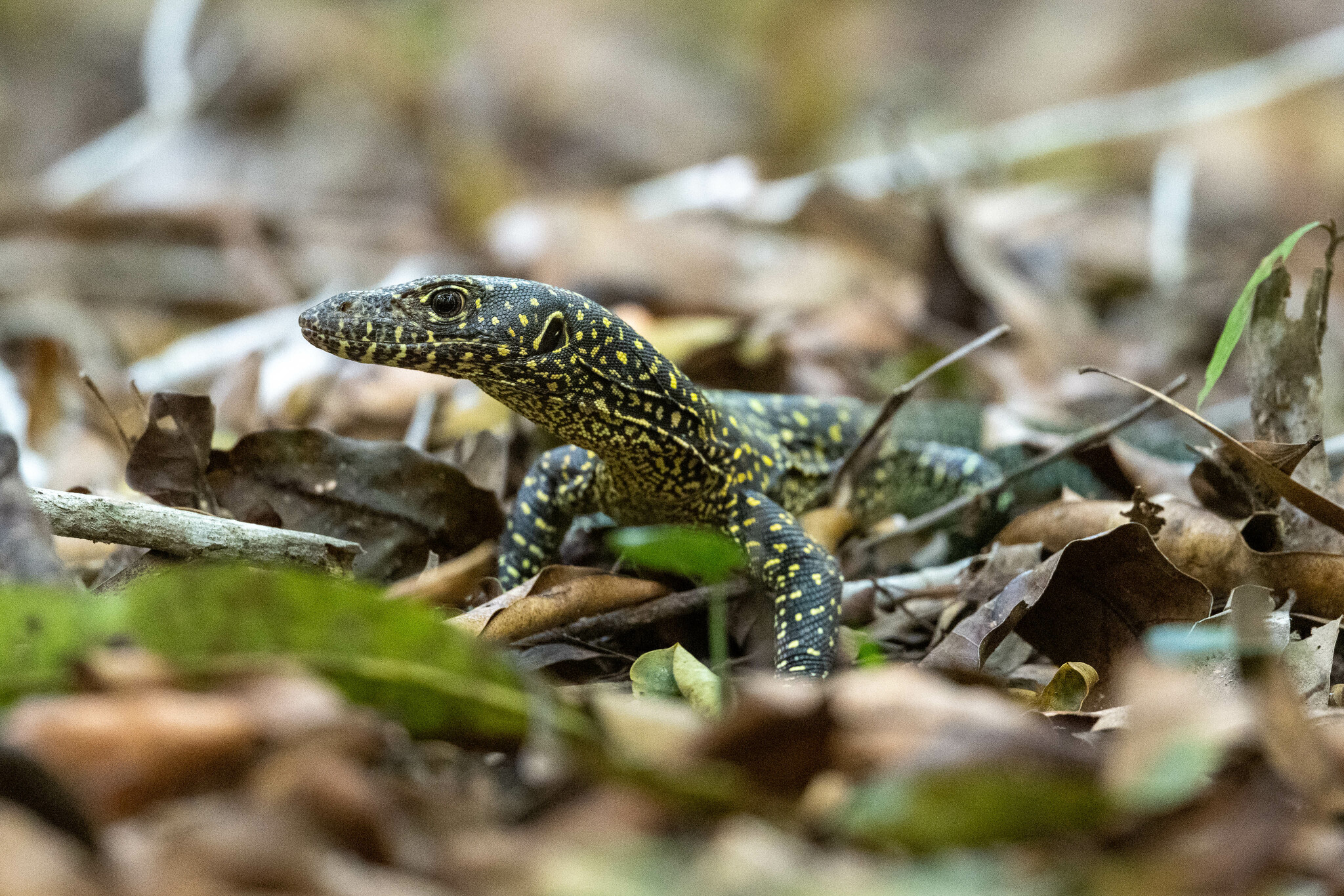
Juvenile, Cape York Peninsula, Australia

The blue-tailed monitor can reach a total length (including the tail) up to 135 cm (53 in). The maximum size record of this species belongs to a male specimen collected from Cape York in 1948, with a total length of 173.5 cm (68 in) despite missing its tail tip.

The body is greyish-blue in colour and covered with round ocelli. The throat is whitish and strongly marbled. The tail shows clearly a double keel. The tail is light blue (hence the common name of this species), which is interrupted by black cross bands. In adults this color partially fades away. Scales on its neck are smooth and oval. It has a yellow tongue, which is a shared characteristic of the V. doreanus species complex.

== Ecology ==
Like other monitors of the V. doreanus species complex, the blue-tailed monitor feeds on a relatively high amount of vertebrate prey such as birds, especially when compared to other monitors of the subgenus Euprepriosaurus. It will also feed on invertebrates such as beetles.

Like many monitor lizards, males fight over females and territory by standing on their hindlegs and grappling with each other.

In Australia, they are predated on by black-headed pythons.

It is sympatric with the mangrove monitor and the peach-throated monitor in many parts of its range.

== Bibliography ==
- Harvey, Michael B. and David G. Barker A New Species of Blue-Tailed Monitor Lizard (Genus Varanus) from Halmahera Island, Indonesia Herpetologica, Vol. 54, No. 1 (Mar., 1998), pp. 34–44.
- Bennett, D. (1995). A Little Book of Monitor Lizards. Viper Press, UK.
- Böhme, W., H. G. Horn & T. Ziegler (1994). Zur Taxonomie der Pazifikwarane (Varanus-indicus-Komplex): Revalidierung von Varanus doreanus (A. B. MEYER, 1874) mit Beschreibung einer neuen Unterart. Salamandra 30 (2): 119-142.
- Boulenger, G.A. 1885. Catalogue of the lizards in the British Museum (Natural History). Vol. 2, Second edition. London, xiii+497 pp.
- De Lisle, H.F. (1996). Natural History of Monitor Lizards. Krieger, Malabar (Florida)
- De Rooij, N. de (1915). The Reptiles of the Indo-Australian Archipelago. I. Lacertilia, Chelonia, Emydosauria. Leiden (E. J. Brill), xiv + 384 pp.
- Good, David A.;Bauer, Aaron M.;G_nther, Rainer (1993). An Annotated Type Catalogue of the Anguimorph Lizards (Squamata: Anguidae, Helodermatidae, Varanidae, Xenosauridae) in the Zoological Museum, Berlin Mitt. Zool. Mus. Berl. 69 (1): 45-56
- Koch A, Arida E, Schmitz A, Böhme W, Ziegler T. (2009). Refining the polytypic species concept of mangrove monitors (Squamata: Varanus indicus group): a new cryptic species from the Talaud Islands, Indonesia, reveals the underestimated diversity of Indo-Australian monitor lizards. Australian Journal of Zoology 57(1): 29-40
- Lesson, R.P. (1830). Description de quelques reptiles nouveaux ou peu connus. In: M.L.I. Duperrey, Voyage Autour du Monde Execute par Ordre du Roi, sur la Corvette de La Majeste, La Coquille, exécuté Pendant les Annees 1822, 1823, 1824 et 1825. 2. Zoologie 2 (1). Arthur Bertrand, Paris: 1-65
- Mertens, R. (1942). Die Familie der Warane (Varanidae), 3. Teil: Taxonomie. Abh. Senckenb. naturf. Ges., 466: 235-391
- Meyer, A.B. (1874). [Eine Mittheilung von Hrn. Dr. Adolf Meyer] über die von ihm auf Neu-Guinea und den Inseln Jobi, Mysore und Mafoor im Jahre 1873 gesammelten Amphibien. Monatsber. K. Preuss. Akad. Wiss. Berlin 1874: 128-140
- Peters, Wilhem Carl Hartwig and G. Doria. (1878). Catalogo dei retilli e dei batraci raccolti da O. Beccari, L. M. D'Alberts e A. A. Bruijn. nella sotto-regione Austro-Malese. Annali del Museo Civico de Storia Naturale di Genova. ser. 1, 13: 323-450
- Philipp, K.M.; Ziegler, T. & Böhme, W. (2007). Preliminary Investigations of the Natural Diet of Six Monitor Lizard Species of the Varanus (Euprepiosaurus) indicus Group. Mertensiella 16: 336-345
