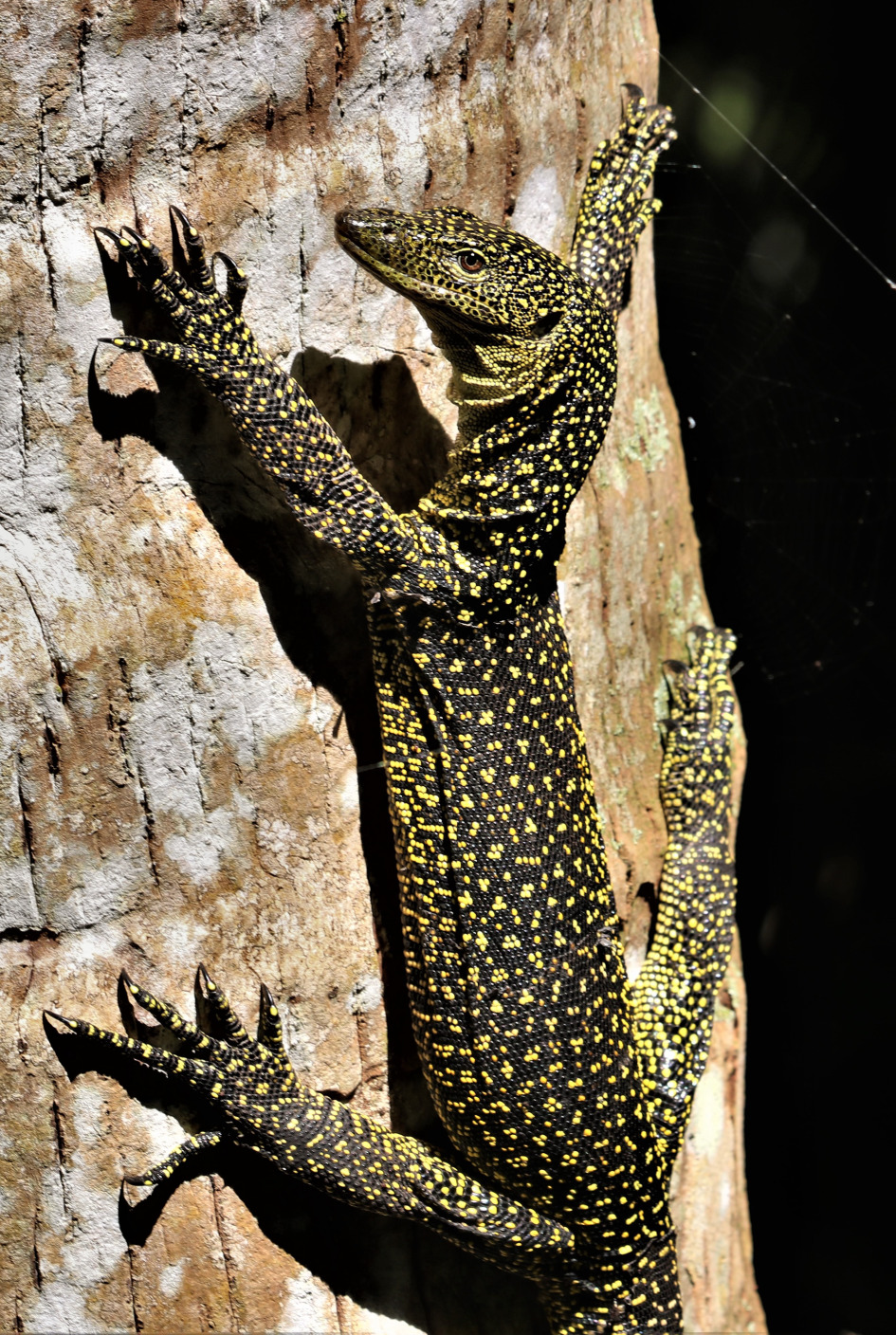
- On Guam

Scientific classification
- Kingdom: Animalia
- Phylum: Chordata
- Class: Reptilia
- Order: Squamata
- Suborder: Anguimorpha
- Family: Varanidae
- Genus: Varanus
- Species: V. tsukamotoi

Binomial name
- Varanus tsukamotoi (Kishida, 1929)

= Mariana monitor =

Species of lizard

Varanus tsukamotoi, the Mariana monitor or Saipan monitor, is a species of lizard of the family Varanidae. It is endemic to the Northern Mariana Islands and Guam, and has been introduced to Japan in the Marshall Islands.

== Etymology ==
It was named by Kyukichi Kishida after Dr. Iwasaburo Tsukamoto, who supported his expedition to the South Pacific. In the Chamorro language, it is known as hilitai.

== Taxonomy ==
Along with the closely related Bennett's long-tailed monitor, it was long considered a population of the mangrove monitor (V. indicus) that had been introduced from the East Indies to smaller Pacific islands by Polynesians to provide a meat supply. However, other scientists maintained that this would not be likely, as the monitors would compete with humans for food, grow slowly, and yield little meat. The presence of a native Chamorro name for the species (hilitai) also indicates that it would have either been present on the islands when they arrived, or the Chamorro would have brought the species with them.

Phylogenetic analysis has also affirmed monitors being native to Micronesia, having colonized the islands and diverged from the V. indicus species complex during the Late Pleistocene.

It's two closest relatives are Bennett's long-tailed monitor and the Lirung monitor.

== Distribution ==
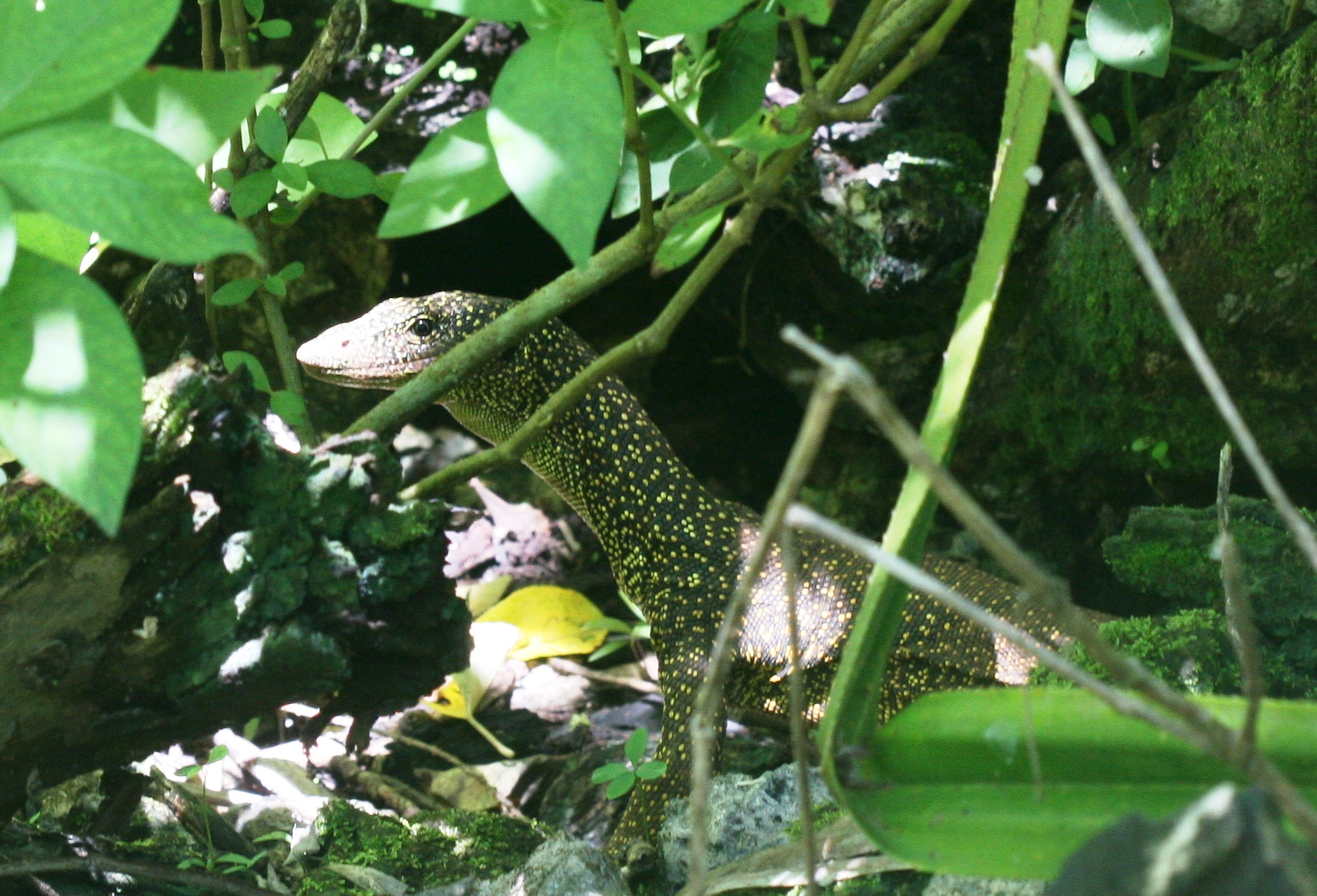
Mariana monitor in Guam forest

The Mariana monitor is native to the Mariana Islands of Alamagan, Anatahan, Cocos Island, Guam, Pagan, Rota, Saipan and Tinian, as well as Kosrae, in the Federated States of Micronesia. It is also known from the Marshall Islands, on Aur and Enewetak Atolls, and Japan; the species is thought to have found its way to the latter island via human introduction. An alleged record from the Bonin Islands in Japan is thought to be erroneous.

For unknown reasons, this species is not present on Sarigan, in the Northern Marianas island chain, despite being present on adjacent islands; the monitor species on that island is instead thought to be Bennett's long-tailed monitor (Varanus bennetti).

== Diet ==
Mariana monitors in the Southern Mariana Islands shifted major prey classes when their regular prey began declining. The monitors were known for being the top predator on Guam, but the introduction of the brown tree snake (Boiga irregularis) led to a decrease in prey numbers, prompting the monitors to switch to eating invertebrates and foraging through human garbage.

== Reproduction ==
The species lacks distinct sexual dimorphism, but mature male monitors on Guam have been reported to be three times the mass of mature females.

== Relationship with humans ==
An ethnic group on Guam eats the monitors as a traditional food, and a business there sells monitors for consumption. The USDA's Animal and Plant Inspection Service announced that it intends to use a combination of two poisons, diphacinone and brodifacoum, to kill-off the invasive rodents on Cocos Island (Guam), thus negatively affecting monitor populations, either by directly consuming the poisoned rodents, dead or alive, or by lowering their overall prey availability leading to starvation. The USDA has also expressed an interest in lowering (or eliminating) the introduced mangrove monitor (Varanus indicus) population on Cocos Island by at least 80%, with several trapping methods proposed by herpetologist Seamus Ehrhard; this is deemed as vital, as the monitors are believed to prey upon the critically endangered, ground-nesting Guam rail (Gallirallus owstoni) and its eggs. Most locals, however, do not see the monitors as invasive, with many activists being firmly opposed to attempts to cull the lizards on the islands. This stance has been further supported by more recent and detailed genetic analyses, which have shown the monitors to be native to Guam and other adjacent islands, having arrived there during the Pleistocene epoch.
