= Sago monitor =

Conservation status
- Endangered (IUCN 3.1)

Scientific classification
- Kingdom: Animalia
- Phylum: Chordata
- Class: Reptilia
- Order: Squamata
- Suborder: Anguimorpha
- Family: Varanidae
- Genus: Varanus
- Subgenus: Euprepiosaurus
- Species: V. obor

Binomial name
- Varanus obor Weijola and Sweet 2010

Species of lizard

The sago monitor or torch monitor (Varanus obor) is a species of monitor lizards endemic to the Indonesian island of Sanana.

== Description ==
Varanus obor is the only melanistic member of the Pacific monitor (V. indicus) group, and the only species belonging to the subgenus Euprepiosaurus, which has prominent red-orange markings on its body. Proportions of the body and the construction of scales most closely resemble V. melinus, which can be found on the islands of Mangole and Taliabu. Most often, V. obor occurs in coastal sago palm swamps - a habitat that is underused by other species of the V. indicus group, but is also frequently encountered in riparian habitats and rainforests. It can reach lengths of 0.8 to 1.5 m (2 ft 7 in to 4 ft 11 in) in length and weigh between 0.5 and 1.5 kg (1.1 and 3.3 lb). The lizard was named obor (meaning "torch" in Indonesian) due to its unique coloration.

The sago monitor was first seen in the wild by Valter Weijola, who in March and April 2009 visited Sanana. One preserved specimen (the holotype), apparently collected between 1860 and 1866, is housed in Naturalis (formerly Rijksmuseum van Natuurlijke Historie, later Nationaal Natuurhistorisch Museum), Leiden, the Netherlands.
