= Varanus rainerguentheri =

Conservation status
- Least Concern (IUCN 3.1)

Scientific classification
- Kingdom: Animalia
- Phylum: Chordata
- Class: Reptilia
- Order: Squamata
- Suborder: Anguimorpha
- Family: Varanidae
- Genus: Varanus
- Subgenus: Euprepiosaurus
- Species: V. rainerguentheri

Binomial name
- Varanus rainerguentheri Ziegler, Böhme & Schmitz, 2007

Species of lizard

Varanus rainerguentheri, also commonly known as Günther's mangrove monitor and Rainer Günther's monitor, is a species of lizard in the family Varanidae. The species is endemic to the Moluccas.

== Taxonomy ==
V. rainerguentheri is a member of the "mangrove monitor species complex". V. rainerguentheri was described in 2007 from specimens originally designated as V. indicus from the island of Halmahera in the northern Moluccas, Indonesia. It was distinguished based on differences in pattern and well as molecular studies.

== Etymology ==
The specific name, rainerguentheri, is in honor of German herpetologist Rainer Günther.

== Description ==
Average adult total length (including tail) of V. rainerguentheri is up to three feet (1 metre), though specimens close to five feet (1.6 metres) have been observed. The background color is dark greyish-black. The dorsal pattern consists of ocelli with yellow centers, arranged in transverse rows. The ventral surface is cream to greyish in color. The ventral surface possesses faint bands and the throat is unpatterned. The tongue is pink with a dark tip.

== Geographic range ==
V. rainerguentheri was originally described from Halmahera, where it is now known to occur throughout the island. It is also found on the islands of Morotai, Ternate, Tidore, Gebe, Bacan, Kasiruta, and Obi. Its range was later expanded to include Buru, and it is likely to prove to be even more widespread throughout the Moluccas.

== Habitat ==
V. rainerguentheri mainly inhabits coastal environments including mangroves, thus filling an ecological niche similar to that held by the mangrove monitor (Varanus indicus) elsewhere. Little is known about the specific ecology and habits of V. rainerguentheri, though it is known to feed mainly on aquatic prey.

== Reprodiction ==
V. rainerguentheri is oviparous and parthenogenetic.
