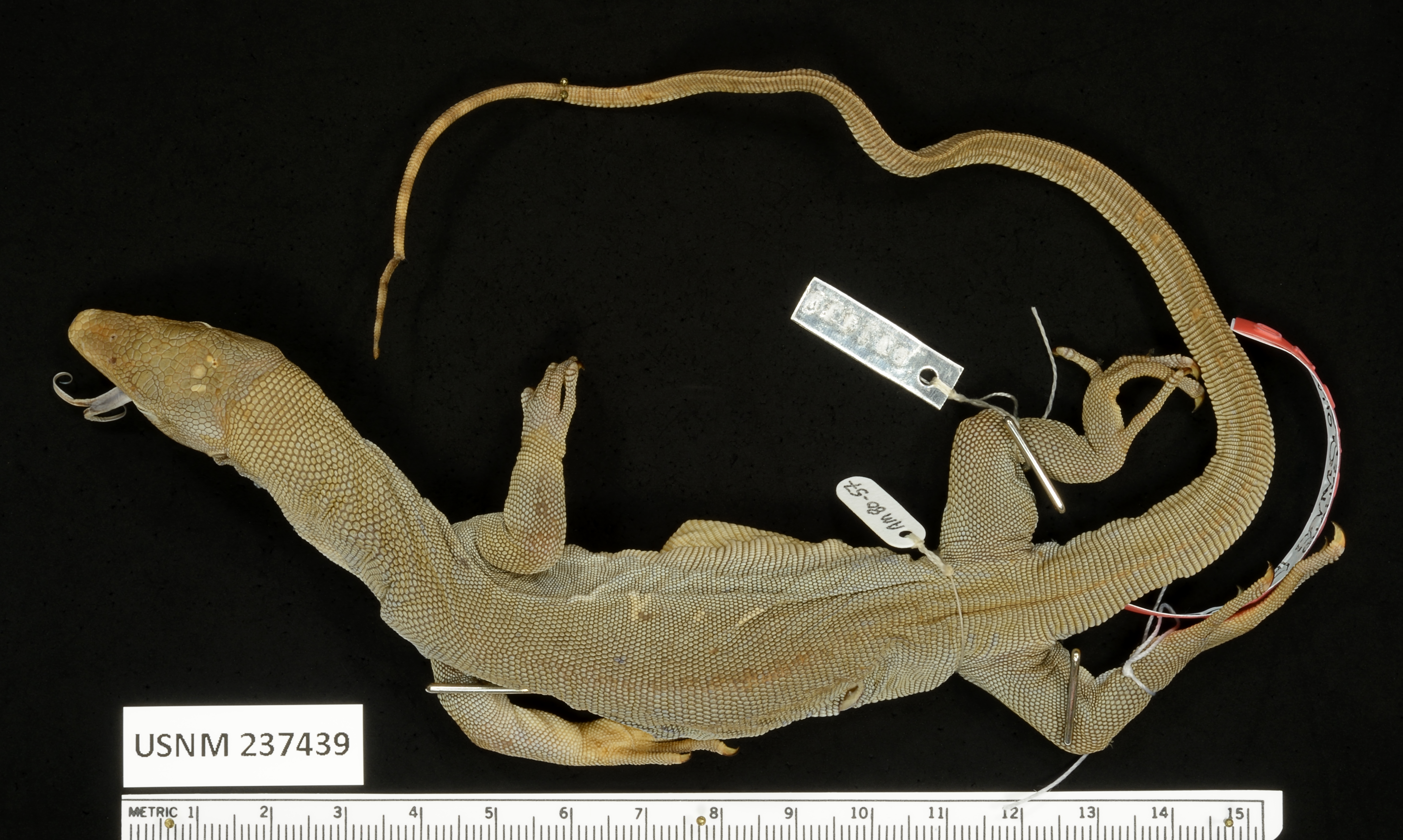
- Holotype specimen, collected in 1980

Conservation status
- Data Deficient (IUCN 3.1)

Scientific classification
- Kingdom: Animalia
- Phylum: Chordata
- Class: Reptilia
- Order: Squamata
- Suborder: Anguimorpha
- Family: Varanidae
- Genus: Varanus
- Subgenus: Euprepiosaurus
- Species: V. zugorum

Binomial name
- Varanus zugorum Böhme & Ziegler, 2005

= Varanus zugorum =

Species of lizard

Varanus zugorum, also known commonly as the silver monitor or Zugs' monitor, is a species of monitor lizard in the family Varanidae. The species is endemic to the island of Halmahera in the Moluccas, in Indonesia. The only known specimen of this species was a juvenile collected in 1980.

== Etymology ==
The specific name, zugorum (genitive, plural), is in honor of American herpetologist George R. Zug and his wife Patricia.

== Geographic range ==
V. zugorum is only known with certainty from its type locality in the vicinity of Jailolo. Reasonably reliable local eyewitness accounts exist from Akesahu (lower western side of Kao Bay) and Labi Labi (northeast Halmahera).

== Taxonomy ==
Zugs' monitor was described from a juvenile museum specimen originally labeled as Varanus indicus. At least one or two specimens resembling the type specimen and generally agreed to represent this species have been imported at various times for the pet trade. Other than this however, the species is unknown. Its habits are unknown as it has not been observed in the wild and is rarely seen even by natives.

== Conservation status ==
V. zugorum is among the 25 "most wanted lost" species that are the focus of Re:wild's "Search for Lost Species" initiative. The Biodiversity Group is currently working to find the Zug's monitor using EDNA and using a 3D scanning camera to avoid having to taxidermy the specimen.

== Description ==
Based on the holotype, a juvenile that measures 150 mm (5.9 in) in snout–vent length and 360 mm (14.2 in) in total length, the background color of V. zugorum is a silver-greyish. The body and limbs are patternless save for scattered bluish scales. The tail is mostly patternless except for a dozen faint dark bands towards the tip. The underside is yellowish and unpatterned. The tongue is dark purplish with a pink base.
