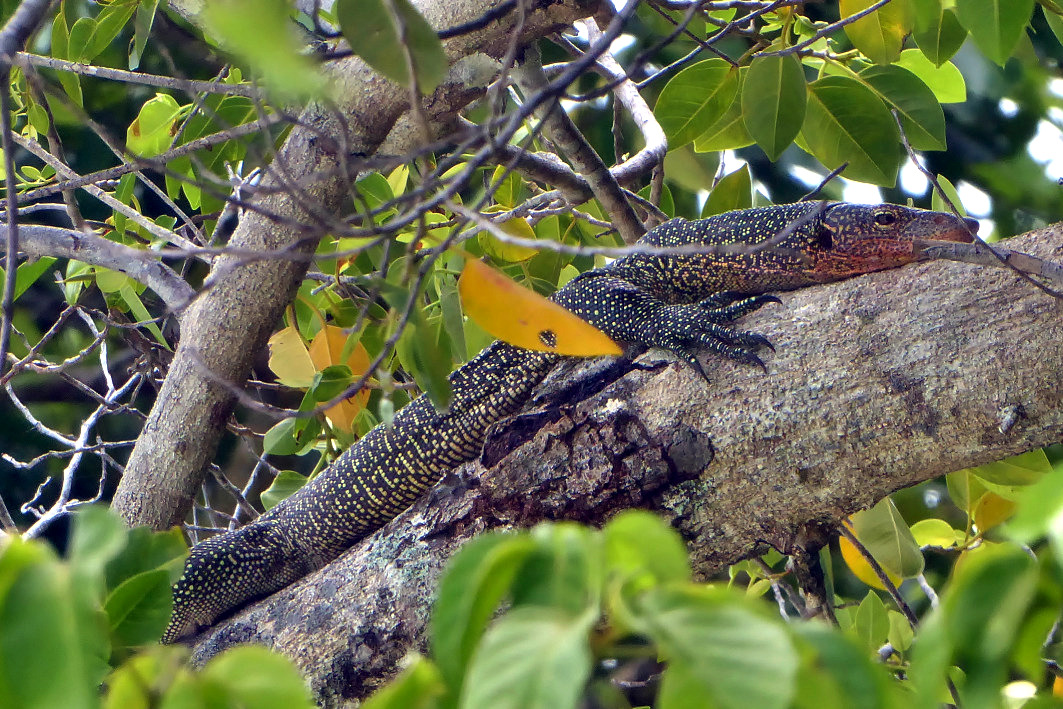

Conservation status
- CITES Appendix II

Scientific classification
- Kingdom: Animalia
- Phylum: Chordata
- Class: Reptilia
- Order: Squamata
- Suborder: Anguimorpha
- Family: Varanidae
- Genus: Varanus
- Subgenus: Euprepiosaurus
- Species: V. bennetti

Binomial name
- Varanus bennetti Weijola, Vahtera, Koch, Schmitz & Kraus, 2020

= Bennett's long-tailed monitor =

Species of lizard

Bennett's long-tailed monitor (Varanus bennetti) is a species of monitor lizard in the family Varanidae. It is found in Palau, the Federated States of Micronesia, and the Northern Mariana Islands.

== Etymology ==
The specific epithet, bennetti, is in honor of the late biologist Dr. Daniel Bennett and his life-long commitment to the study and conservation of monitor lizards.

== Taxonomy ==
Together with the related Mariana monitor (V. tsukamotoi), the species was formerly considered conspecific with the mangrove monitor (V. indicus).

== Distribution ==
It is found in Koror, Ngeaur and Ngcheangel islands in Palau and Yap and Losiap islands in the Federated States of Micronesia. A disjunct population is also known from Sarigan in the Northern Mariana Islands.

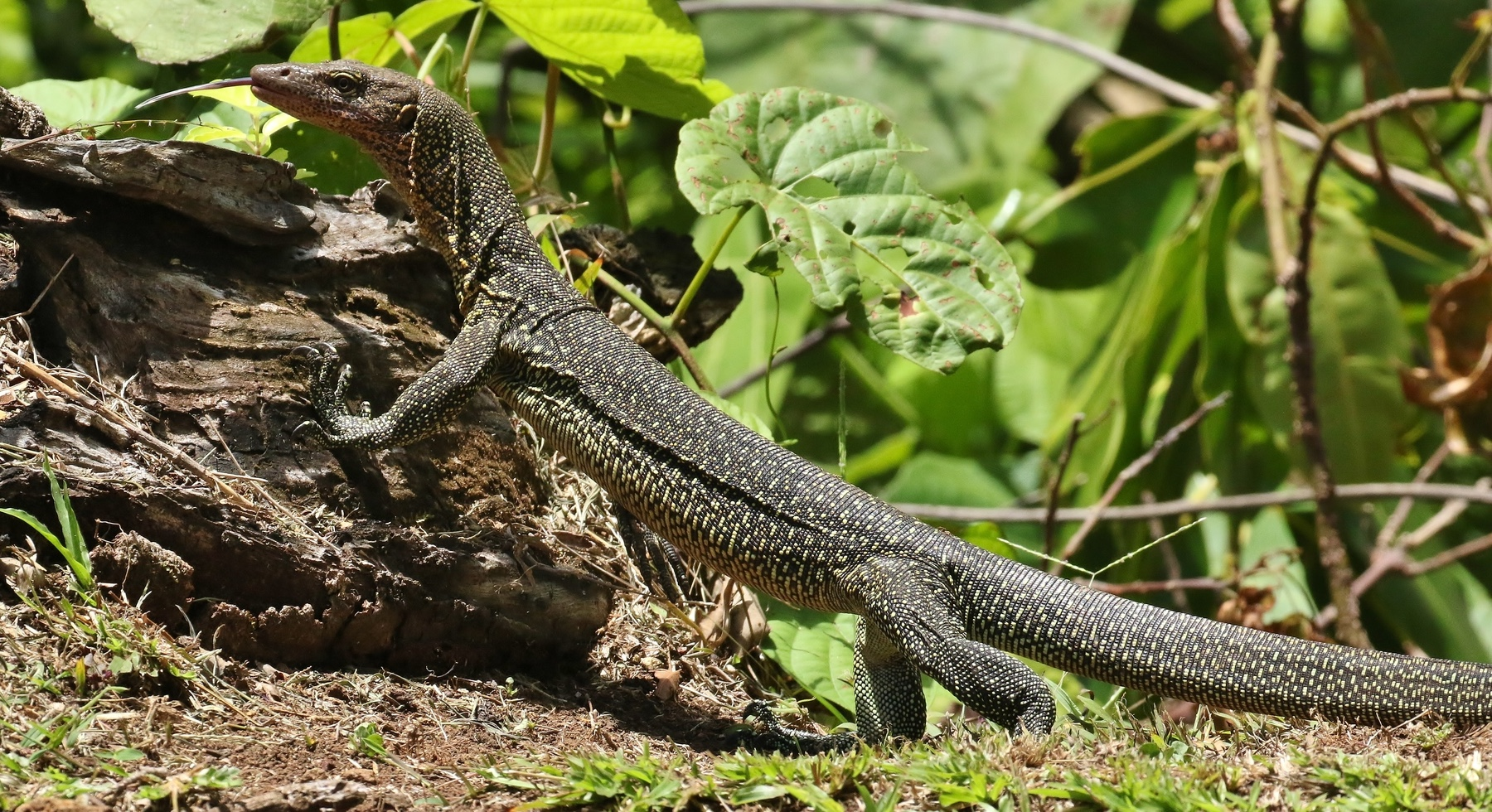
Ngarchelong, Palau

Due to the remoteness of its habitats, it was formerly suggested that populations of V. bennetti were actually populations of mangrove monitor introduced by either the native Micronesians or the German or Japanese colonial empires. However, fossils, linguistic evidence and literary records indicate that the monitor lizards were present on the islands for much longer than expected, and thus likely represented an endemic species to the region, which DNA sequencing has also affirmed. However, the Ulithi population may originate from a recent introduction.

The population on Sarigan is extremely isolated from the other populations of V. bennetti, and the monitors of all neighboring islands are Mariana monitors rather than V. bennetti. This has raised the question of whether humans transported V. bennetti to Sarigan. However, it is very unlikely that humans would have transported the species all that way and there are notable genetic differences in the Sarigan population, indicating that the species naturally reached that area.

== Ecology ==
Monitors on Palau are generally more terrestrial in nature and take refuge in terrestrial habitats, and on Ngeaur they are most abundant in the island's rocky limestone interior. This is in contrast to most other species in the V. indicus species complex, which take refuge in trees and are most common in coastal habitats. Their diet consists primarily of the Polynesian rat, insects, and smaller lizards.

== Relationship with humans ==
Due to the species formerly being considered an introduced population of mangrove monitor, there have been many attempts to control or cull populations, which may be harmful to the species' survival. Cane toads were introduced to Kayangel in Palau to reduce lizard predation on livestock, and the demise of the mangrove monitors led to an increase in numbers of beetles known to be harmful to coconuts. Bounty programs in the early 2010s are known to have culled hundreds of monitors in Angaur, Palau. There have also been plans to eradicate the species from Losiap. It has been recommended that V. bennetti be treated as an indigenous species worthy of conservation.
