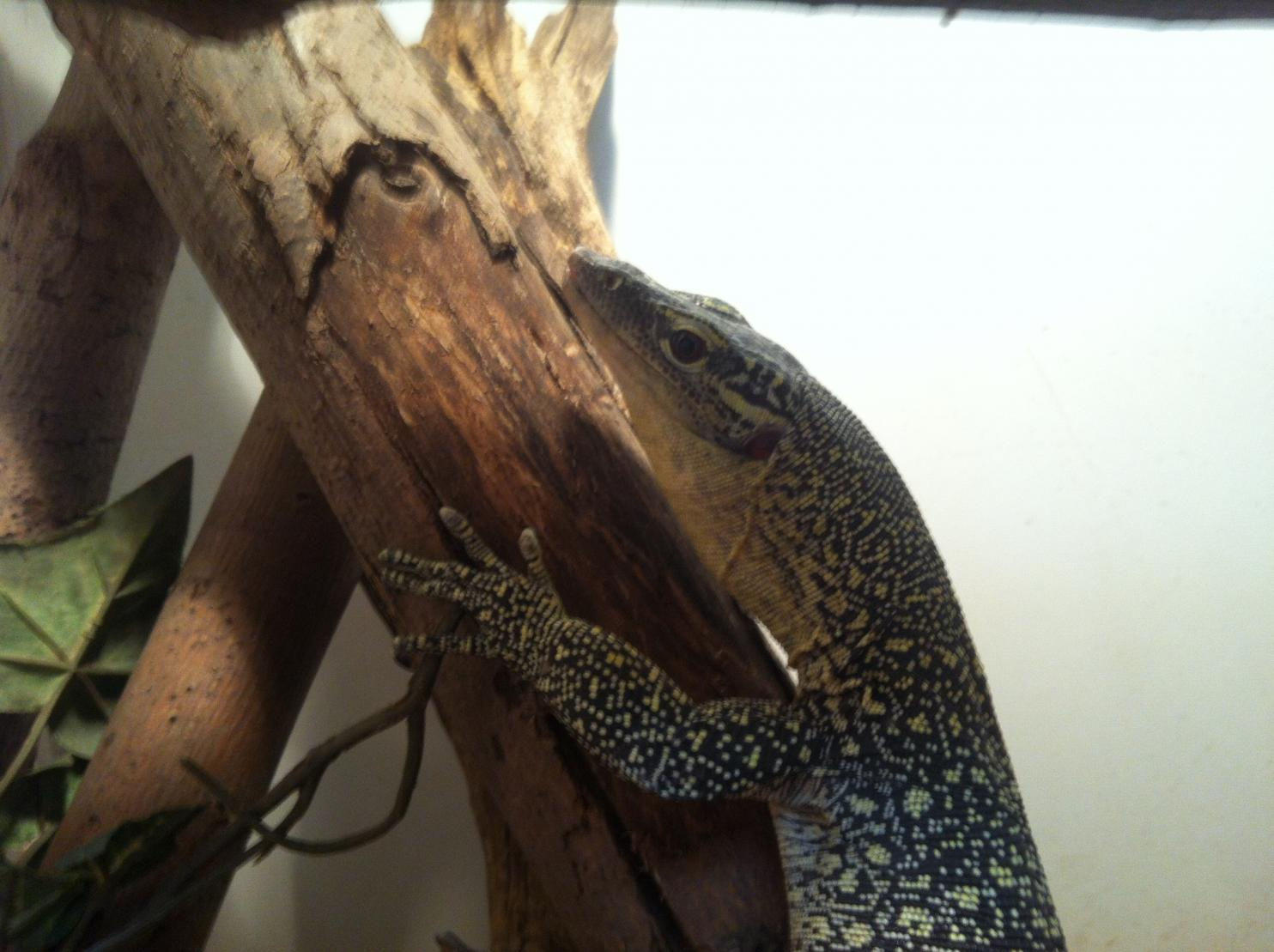
- A Ceram Mangrove Monitor in captivity

Conservation status
- CITES Appendix II

Scientific classification
- Kingdom: Animalia
- Phylum: Chordata
- Class: Reptilia
- Order: Squamata
- Suborder: Anguimorpha
- Family: Varanidae
- Genus: Varanus
- Subgenus: Euprepiosaurus
- Species: V. cerambonensis

Binomial name
- Varanus cerambonensis Philipp, Böhme & Ziegler, 1999

= Ceram mangrove monitor =

Species of lizard

The Ceram mangrove monitor (Varanus cerambonensis) is a species of monitor lizards found in Indonesia. Specifically, it is found on some of the central Moluccan Islands including: Ambon, Seram, Obi, Buru, and Banda. On Ambon and probably on New Guinea V. cerambonensis occurs sympatrically with Varanus indicus. It is in the indicus species group of the subgenus Euprepiosaurus.

== Description ==
The Ceram mangrove monitor has a total length is up to 95 cm (37 in), making it smaller than most monitor lizards. Its nostrils are situated nearer to tip of its long snout than to its eyes. Its tail is compressed with a double keel on top and is quite prehensile. They are very adept at swimming however they are more closer related to tree monitors as they are known to be found within low-lying rainforests, often in close proximity to streams. The dorsal ground coloration Appears dark Blue to black, with many scattered large and small yellow spots, which are arranged to form cross bands. The belly is yellowish-white. The tongue color is dark from a distance but light up close. They are very wary of people and are not commonly kept as pets. Field observations of V. cerambonensis have been scarce, and little has been published on its natural history and occurrence.
