= Finsch's monitor =

Conservation status
- Least Concern (IUCN 3.1)
- CITES Appendix II

Scientific classification
- Kingdom: Animalia
- Phylum: Chordata
- Class: Reptilia
- Order: Squamata
- Suborder: Anguimorpha
- Family: Varanidae
- Genus: Varanus
- Subgenus: Euprepiosaurus
- Species: V. finschi

Binomial name
- Varanus finschi Wolfgang Böhme (zoologist), Horn & Ziegler, 1994

Synonyms
- Varanus doreanus finschi Böhme, Horn & Ziegler, 1994; Varanus finschi — Ziegler, Philipp & Böhme, 1999; Varanus (Euprepiosaurus) finschi — Ziegler et al., 2007

Species of lizard

Finsch's monitor (Varanus finschi) is a species of monitor lizard in the family Varanidae. The species is native to New Guinea and Australia.

== Etymology ==
The specific name, finschi, is in honor of German naturalist Friedrich Hermann Otto Finsch (1839–1917).

== Geographic range ==
Finsch's monitor was only known from Blanche Bay, Ralum, and Massawa in New Britain. Further research on the available museum specimens enlarged the range of the species, which currently includes the Bismarck Archipelago (New Ireland), New Guinea and Queensland, Australia. The specimen from Queensland lacks any fixed data on its locality, so the exact distribution of Finsch's monitor in Northern Australia remains unknown.

== Pet trade ==
Reports of this species, V. finschi, imported for the pet trade from the Kei Islands are erroneous and refer to similar though distinct animals that have yet to be formally described.

== Habitat ==
V. finschi is found in several habitats: mangrove forest, inland forest, fresh-cut clearings, coconut plantations, and rocky beaches.

== Taxonomy ==
V. finschi belongs to the subgenus Euprepiosaurus along with the closely related Ceram mangrove monitor, Varanus (Euprepiosaurus) cerambonensis, and the peach-throated monitor, Varanus (Euprepiosaurus) jobiensis.

== Description ==
The dorsal pattern of V. finschi adults consists of "black ocelli, which are often arranged in irregular transverse rows - with a yellowish center on a dark grayish background." The dark head of V. finschi is speckled with many yellowish spots. Its tongue color is pink.

== Reproduction ==
V. finschi is oviparous.

== Conservation status ==
Finsch's monitor is of Least Concern as evaluated by the IUCN.
