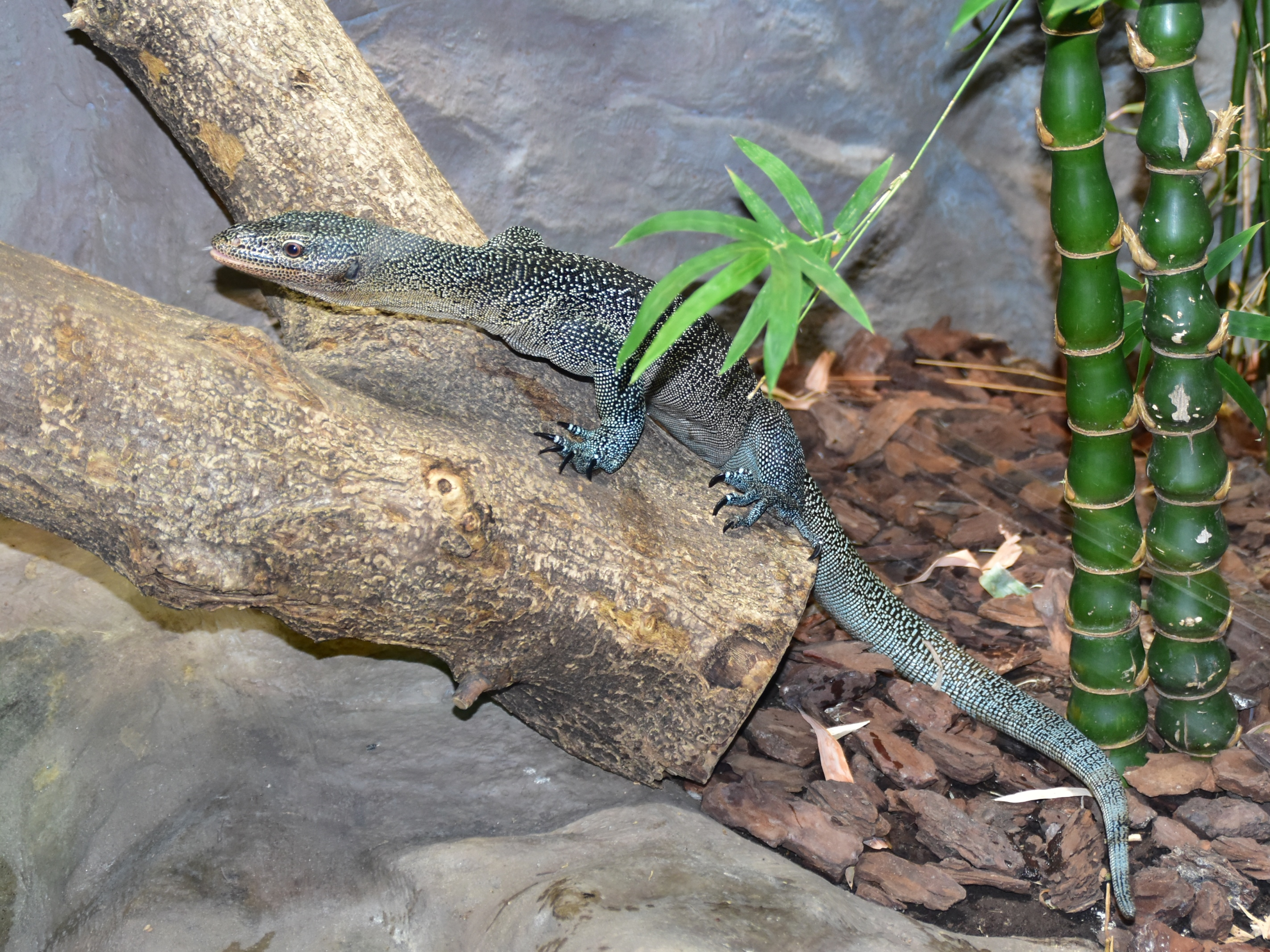

Conservation status
- CITES Appendix II
- Least Concern (IUCN 3.1)

Scientific classification
- Kingdom: Animalia
- Phylum: Chordata
- Class: Reptilia
- Order: Squamata
- Suborder: Anguimorpha
- Family: Varanidae
- Genus: Varanus
- Subgenus: Euprepiosaurus
- Species: V. caerulivirens

Binomial name
- Varanus caerulivirens Ziegler, Böhme, & Philipp, 1999

= Turquoise monitor =

Species of lizard

The turquoise monitor (Varanus caerulivirens) is a species of monitor lizards found in Indonesia. Specifically, it is found on Halmahera Island and in the Maluku Islands.

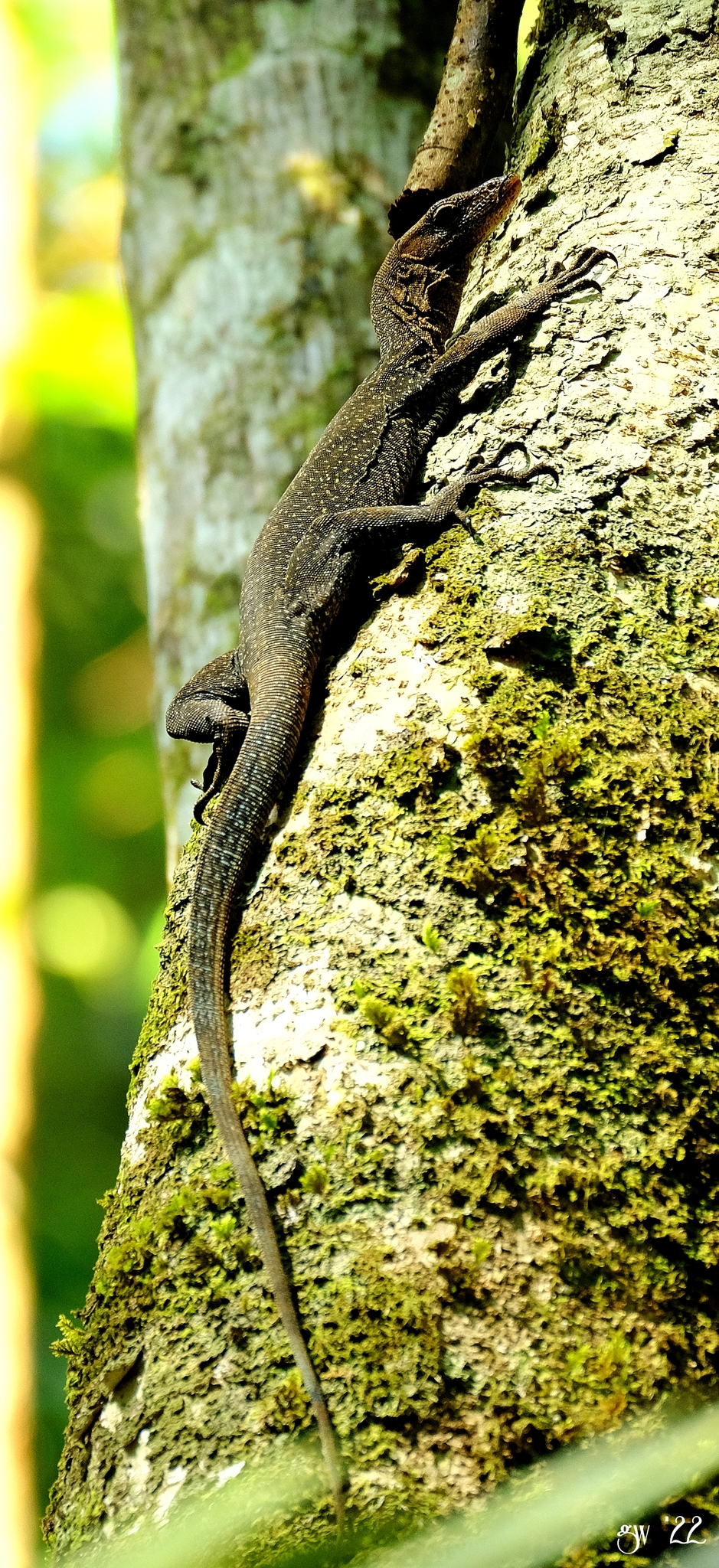
Turquoise monitor

== Description ==
The main coloration of the turquoise monitor is black-brown and greyish-brown with some turquoise pattern. The underside coloration is light yellowish to turquoise with a blackish pattern. The throat and lower part of the neck of this monitor lizard is mostly yellowish. Varanus caerulivirens can grow up to about 110 cm in total length.

The diet of Varanus caerulivirens mainly consists of crustaceans, scorpions, grasshoppers and frogs.
