= Lirung monitor =

Conservation status
- Endangered (IUCN 3.1)

Scientific classification
- Kingdom: Animalia
- Phylum: Chordata
- Class: Reptilia
- Order: Squamata
- Suborder: Anguimorpha
- Family: Varanidae
- Genus: Varanus
- Subgenus: Euprepiosaurus
- Species: V. lirungensis

Binomial name
- Varanus lirungensis Koch, Arida, Schmitz, Böhme, & Ziegler, 2009

Species of lizard

The Lirung monitor (Varanus lirungensis) is a species of monitor lizards on the Talaud Islands in Indonesia. It was recently discovered by André Koch, a German scientist from the Zoological Research Museum Alexander Koenig in Bonn, during a joint German-Indonesian research project. Koch stated the discovery was important, "because it illustrates the high diversity of monitor lizards in Indonesia."

== Description ==
The known Lirung monitor specimen has a total length of about 80 cm. Its belly is yellow-grey with some darker cross bands.
