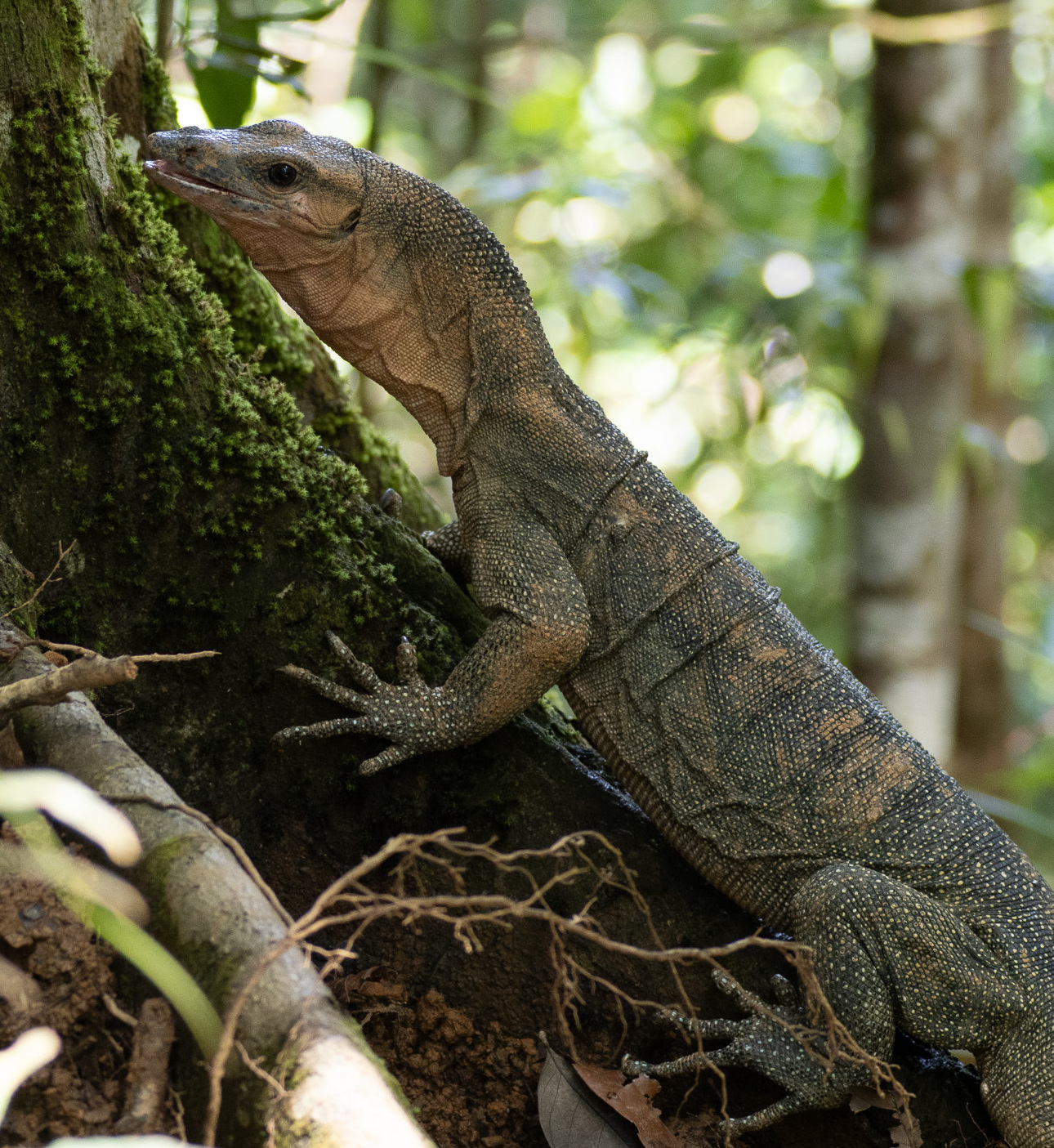
- In Indonesia

Conservation status
- Least Concern (IUCN 3.1)
- CITES Appendix II

Scientific classification
- Kingdom: Animalia
- Phylum: Chordata
- Class: Reptilia
- Order: Squamata
- Suborder: Anguimorpha
- Family: Varanidae
- Genus: Varanus
- Subgenus: Euprepiosaurus
- Species: V. jobiensis

Binomial name
- Varanus jobiensis Ahl, 1932

Synonyms
- Varanus indicus jobiensis Ahl, 1932; Varanus karlschmidti Mertens, 1951; Varanus jobiensis — Böhme, 1991; Varanus (Euprepiosaurus) jobiensis — Ziegler et al., 2007

= Peach-throated monitor =

Species of lizard

The peach-throated monitor (Varanus jobiensis), also known as the Sepik monitor, is a species of monitor lizard native to New Guinea.

== Taxonomy ==
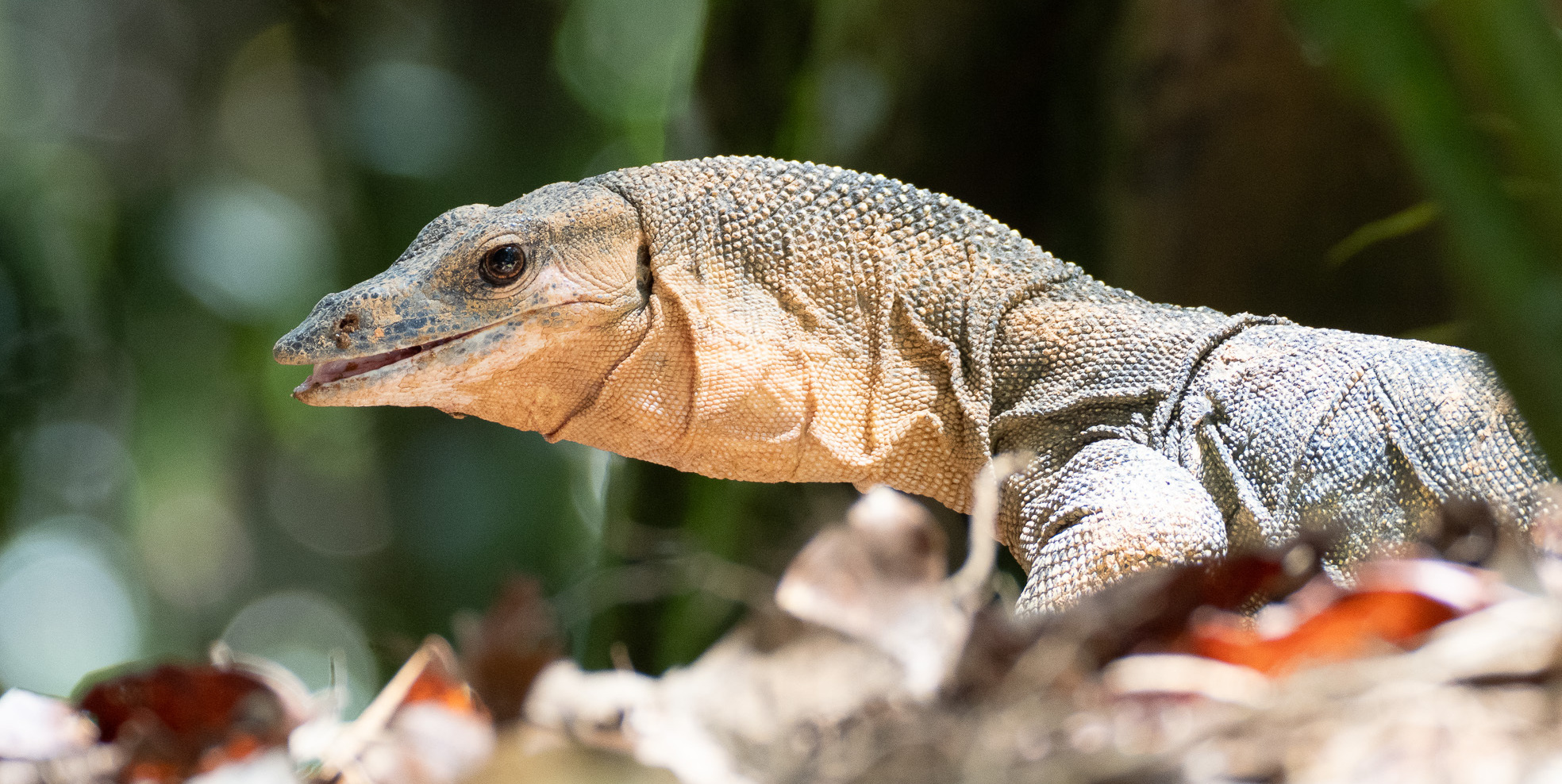
In Indonesia

Varanus jobiensis belongs to the subgenus Euprepiosaurus, which includes species such as the blue-tailed monitor and mangrove monitor, both of which it is sympatric with in much of its range.

It is likely that this species is actually a species complex of multiple different species that have been diverging since the Pliocene, and diverged from the V. indicus species complex 4.7 million years ago.

=== Etymology ===
The specific name, jobiensis, which is Latin, means "from Jobi". Jobi is the island also known as Yapen, which is the type locality of this species.

The junior synonym, Varanus karlschmidti, was named in honour of American herpetologist Karl Patterson Schmidt.

== Distribution ==
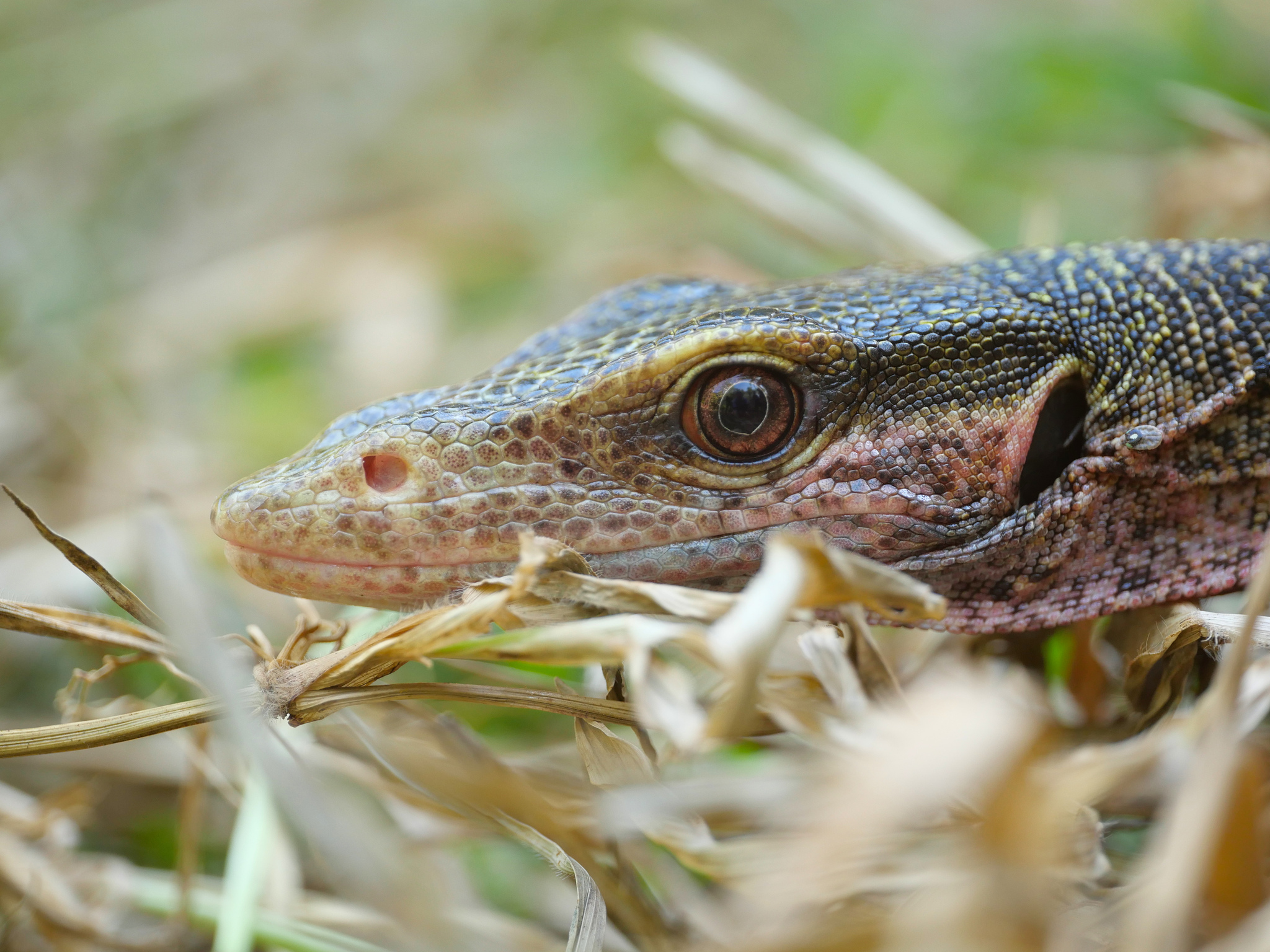
In Madang, Papua New Guinea

Peach-throated monitors are endemic to New Guinea and surrounding islands such as Biak, Salawati, Yapen, Normanby, and Waigeo. It occurs in rainforests at altitudes of 0–900 m (0–2,953 ft).

== Description ==
Peach-throated monitors grow up to 120 centimetres (3.9 ft) in total length (including tail). The colour of the throat is white-yellow to red, to which one of its common names refers.

== Diet ==
Peach-throated monitors primarily eat insects, and sometimes frogs, but may also take freshwater fish and small mammals.

== As food ==
Peach-throated monitors are hunted for human consumption in New Guinea.

== Reproduction ==
Peach-throated monitors are oviparous.

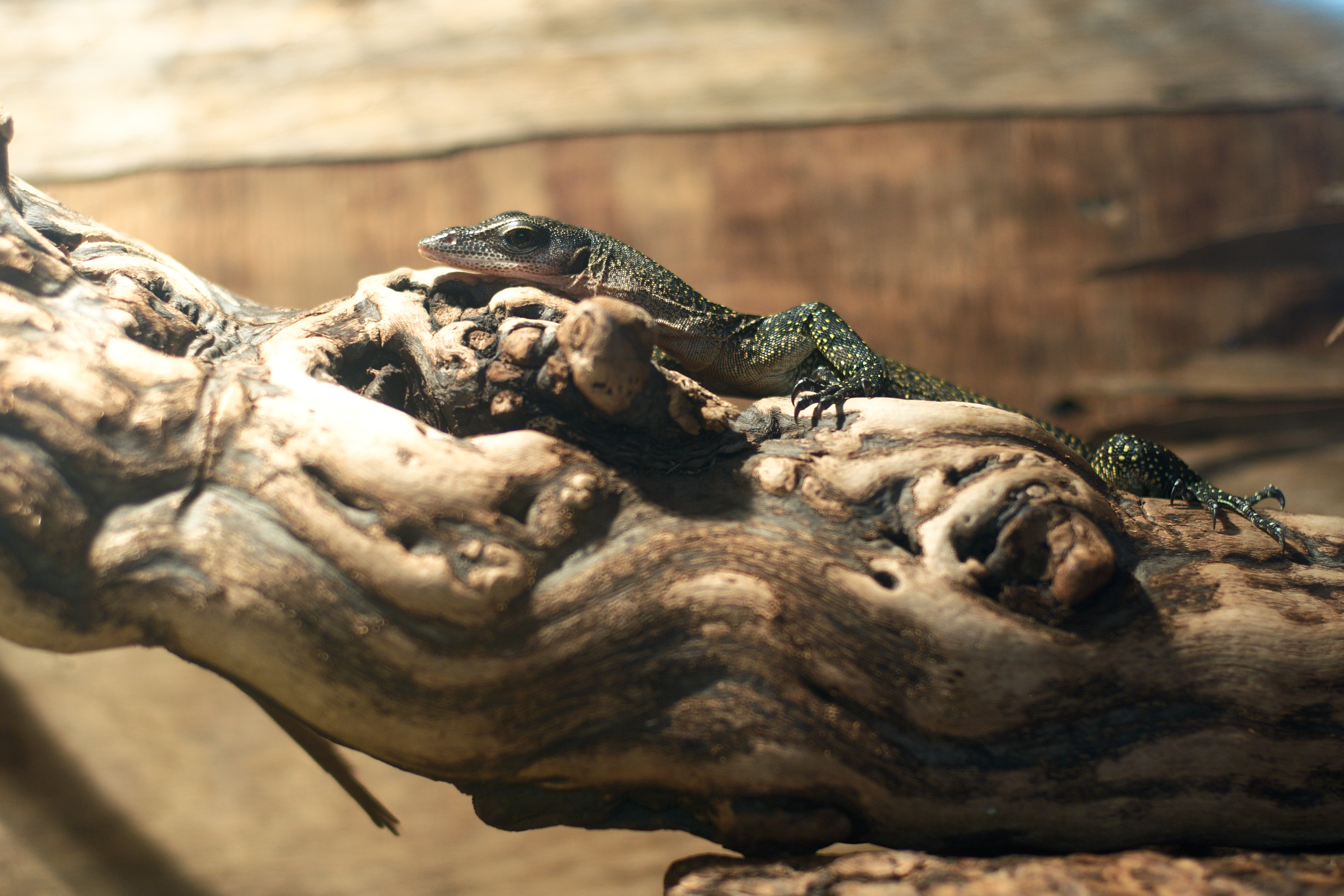
Peach-throated monitor in a vivarium

== Gallery ==
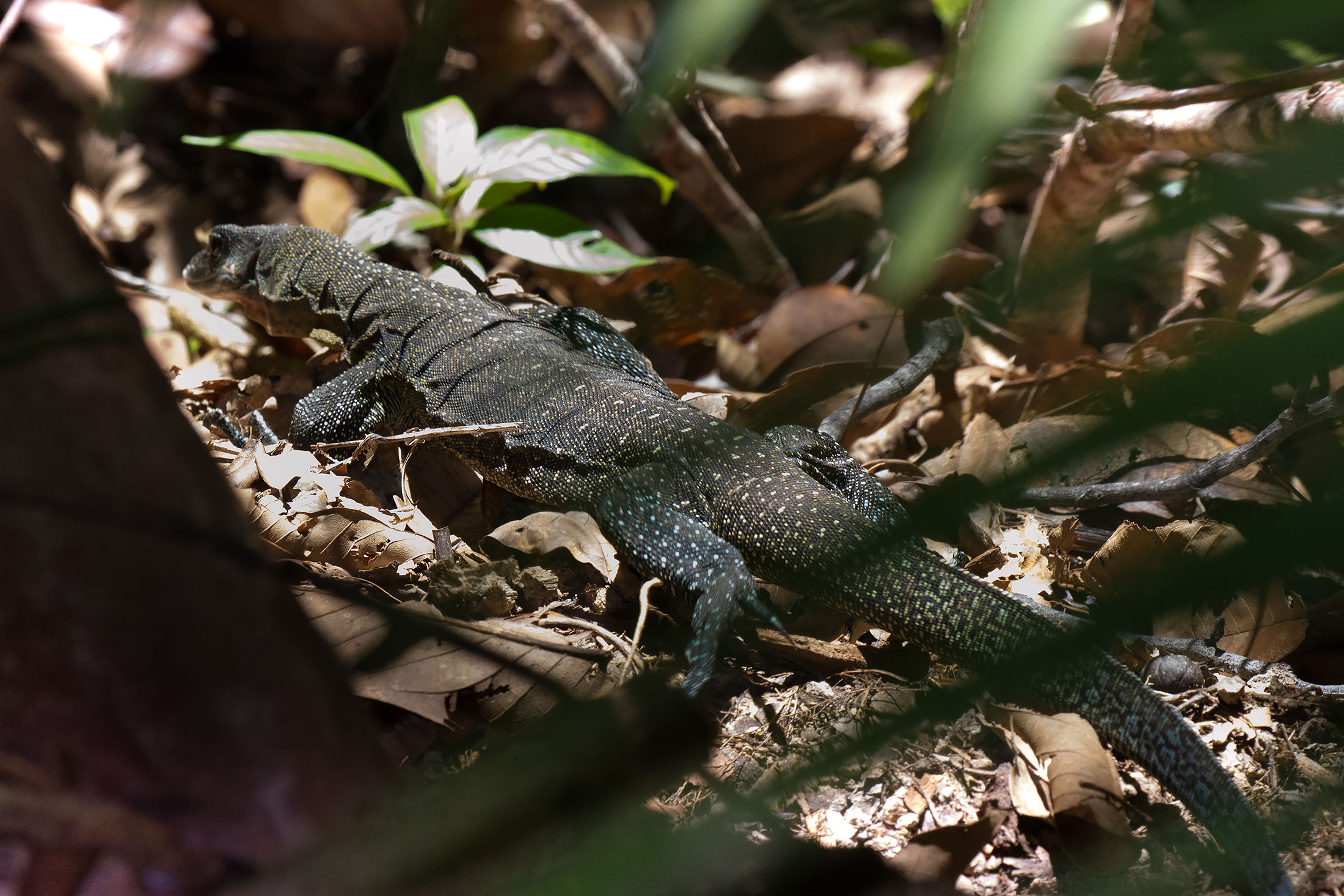
Raja Ampat Papua, 2017

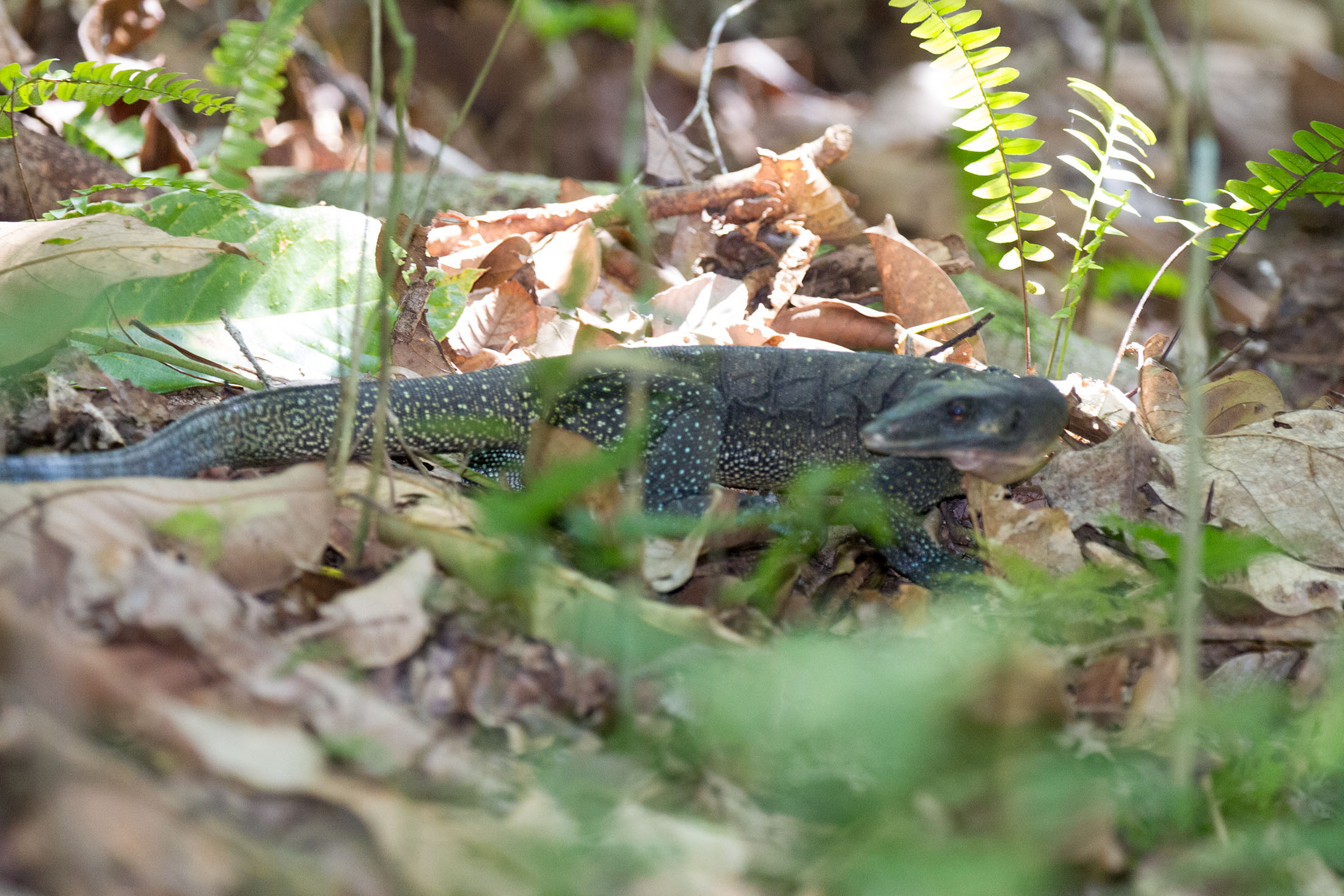
Raja Ampat Papua, 2017

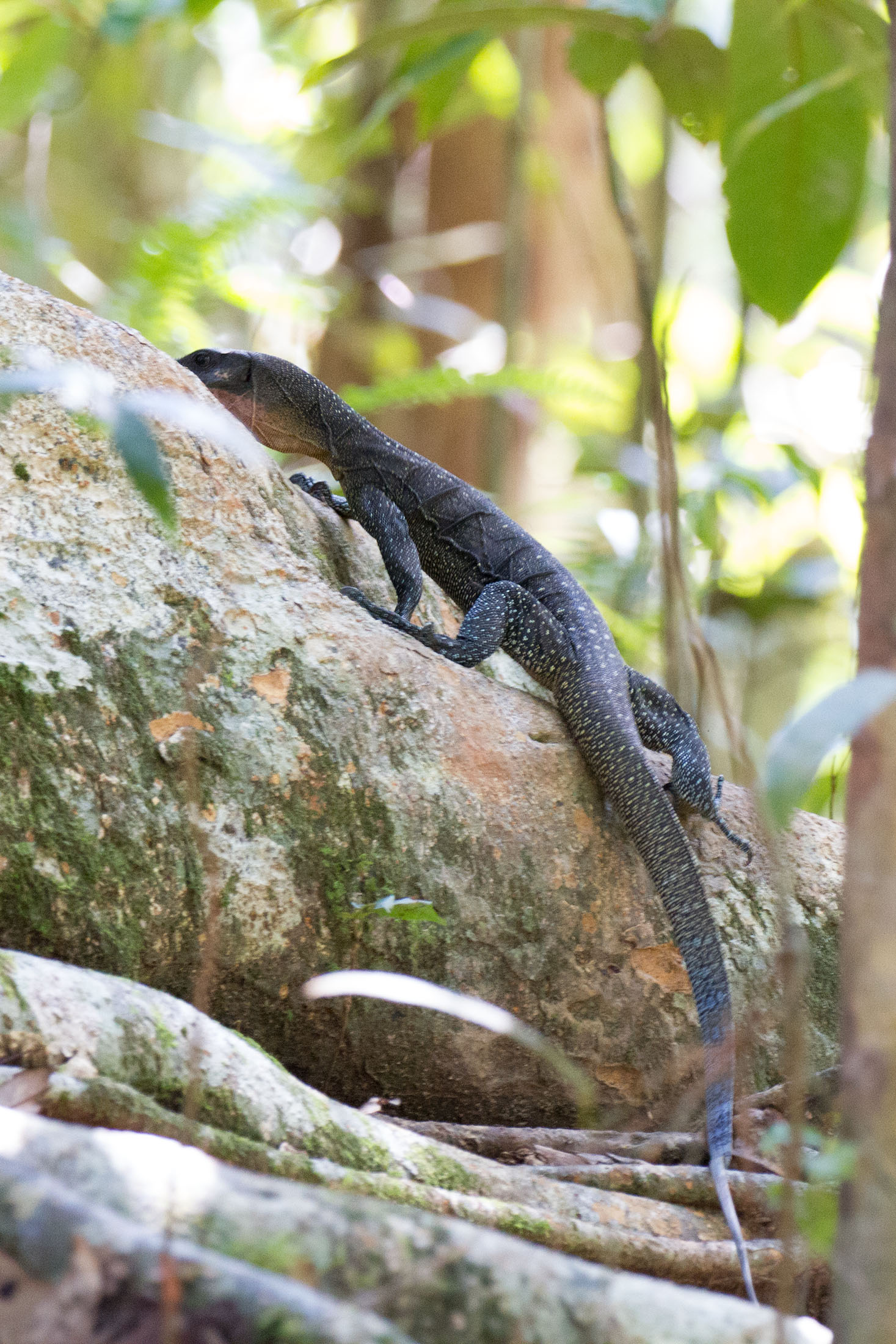
Raja Ampat Papua, 2017, note the peach coloured throat

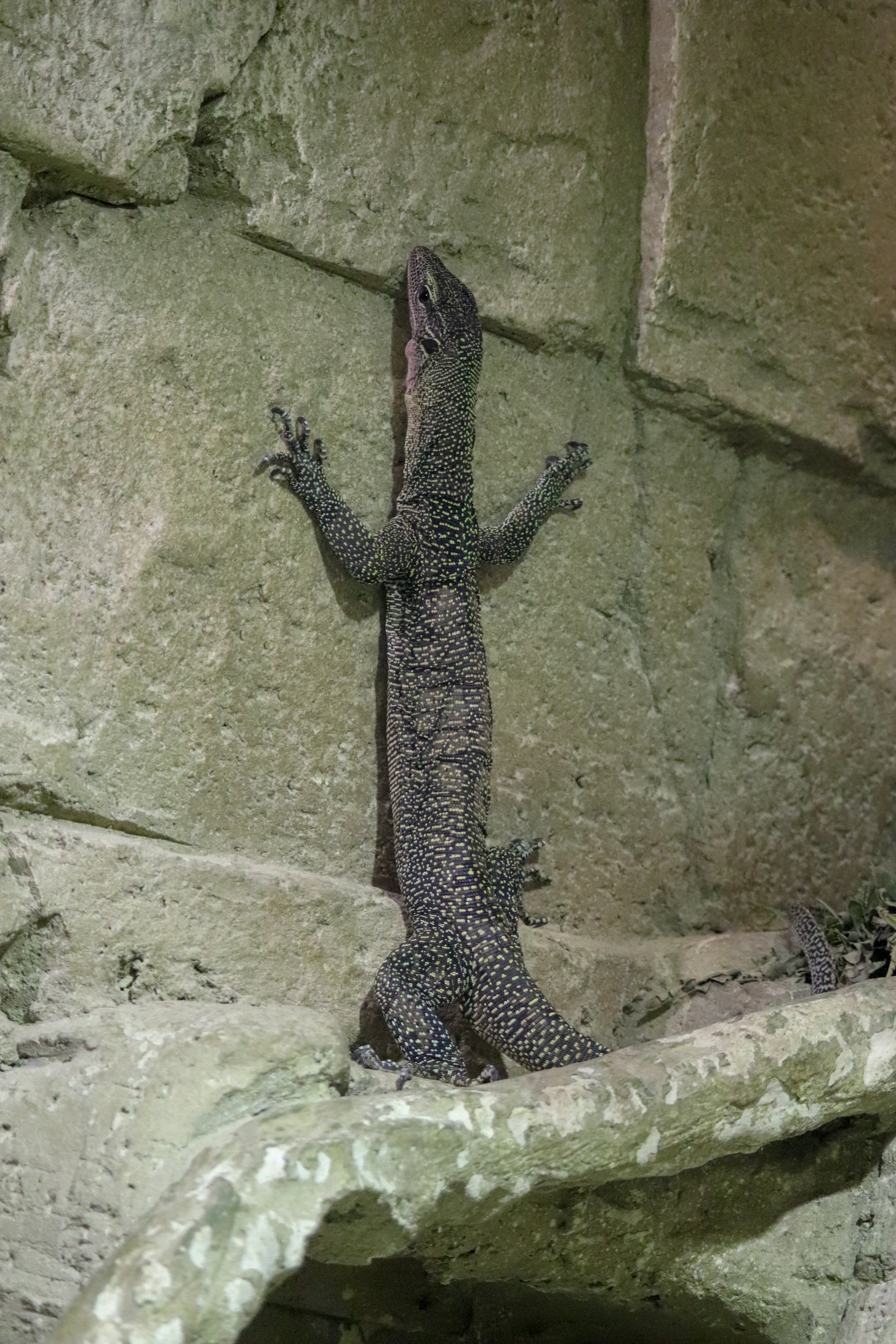
On wall
