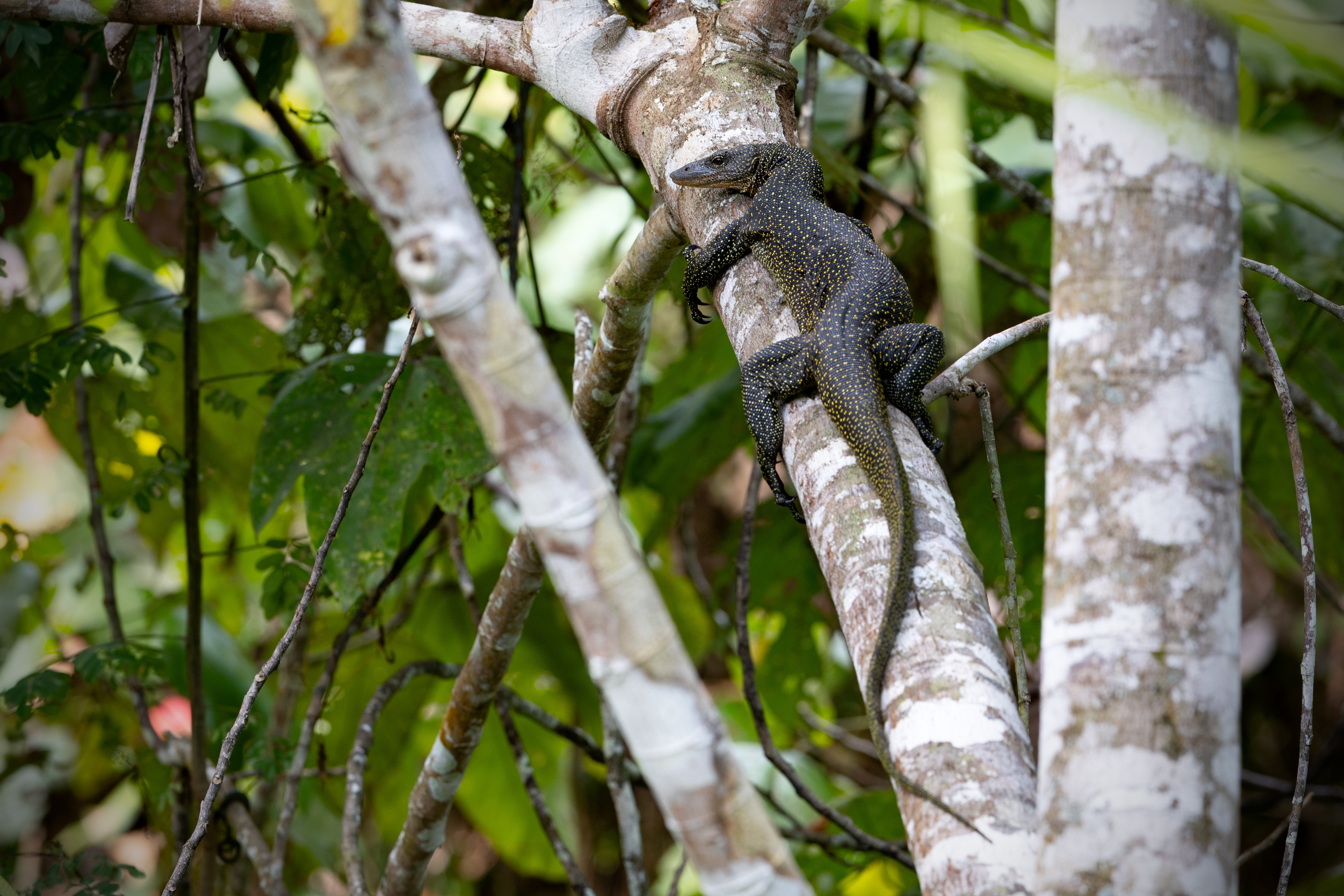

Conservation status
- Least Concern (IUCN 3.1)
- CITES Appendix II

Scientific classification
- Kingdom: Animalia
- Phylum: Chordata
- Class: Reptilia
- Order: Squamata
- Suborder: Anguimorpha
- Family: Varanidae
- Genus: Varanus
- Subgenus: Euprepiosaurus
- Species: V. indicus

Binomial name
- Varanus indicus (Daudin, 1802)

= Mangrove monitor =

Species of lizard

The mangrove monitor, mangrove goanna, or Western Pacific monitor lizard (Varanus indicus) is a member of the monitor lizard family with a large distribution from northern Australia and New Guinea to the Moluccas and Solomon Islands. It grows to lengths of 3.5 to 4 ft (1.1 to 1.2 m). It is known as wbl yb in the Kalam language of Papua New Guinea.

== Taxonomy ==
The mangrove monitor was first described by the French herpetologist François Marie Daudin in 1802. Daudin's original holotype of a subadult specimen was collected on Ambon, Indonesia, and has since disappeared from the museum in Paris. Daudin's original name for the species was Tupinambis indicus, an appellation it would carry for 100 years until being renamed as a Varanus.

The generic name Varanus is derived from the Arabic word waral (ورل), which translates to English as "monitor". Its specific name, indicus, is Latin for the country of India, but in this instance it relates to Indonesia or the East Indies, where the animal was first described.

Due to its large geographic range, V. indicus is considered a cryptic species complex of at least four species: Varanus indicus, Varanus doreanus, Varanus spinulosus, and Varanus jobiensis. More research is being done on possible future species within this complex, not surprisingly, since it has had over 25 different scientific names since it was first described. Populations from Guam, the Marshall Islands, Caroline Islands and Mariana Islands formerly classified in V. indicus are now considered to comprise two distinct species: Bennett's long-tailed monitor (V. bennetti) and the Mariana monitor (V. tsukamotoi).

== Distribution and habitat ==
The mangrove monitor's range extends throughout northern Australia, New Guinea, and the Solomon Islands, where it inhabits damp forests near coastal rivers, mangroves, and permanent inland lakes. It also occurs on the Moluccan islands of Morotai, Ternate, Halmahera, Obi, Buru, Ambon, Haruku, and Seram in Indonesia. Within this range of thousands of miles across hundreds of islands are large variations in size, pattern, and scalation. The monitors have also been introduced to Japan since the 1940s.

== Description ==
The monitor's body is dark green or black in color and covered with golden-yellow spots, with light coloration on the top of its head and a solid, cream-colored belly lacking dark markings. It has a distinct dark purple tongue and serrated teeth. The mangrove monitor attains different sizes in different parts of its range, but seldom if ever exceeds 1.3 m in total length. Australian herpetologist Harold Cogger gives a total length of 100 cm for Australian specimens. The tail is almost twice the length of the body and laterally compressed to aid in swimming. Like the rest of the lizard's body, it is covered with small, oval, keeled scales.

This monitor has the ability to increase the size of its mouth by spreading the hyoid apparatus and dropping the lower jaw to eat large prey, a process similar in appearance to that of snakes, although the jaw of the mangrove monitor remains rigid. The mangrove monitor possesses a Jacobson's organ, which it uses to detect prey, sticking its tongue out to gather scents and touching it to the opening of the organ when the tongue is retracted.

The mangrove monitor is one of only two species of monitor lizards that possess salt-excreting nasal glands, the other being V. semiremex, which enables them to survive in saltwater conditions and to consume marine prey. The presence of this gland probably enabled the monitors to reach new islands and aid in its dispersal throughout the Pacific.

== Diet ==
The mangrove monitor is an opportunistic carnivore, feeding on the eggs of reptiles and birds, mollusks, rodents, insects, crabs, smaller lizards, fish, and carrion. Mangrove monitors are the only monitor capable of catching fish in deep water. In some parts of its range, it is known to eat juvenile crocodiles.

== Reproduction ==
Males fight for females, and in one observation, after mounting the female, the male used his chin to rub the dorsum of the female's head and forequarters. While mounted and oriented head to head, the male and female slowly rotated in a clockwise direction through 360°, with the male remaining superior.

Female mangrove monitors lay two to 12 eggs that measure 3.5 to 5 cm in length. The oblong eggs are white, and hatch in about seven to eight months.

The first successful captive breeding of this species was at the Philadelphia Zoo in 1993.

The Reptilian Zoo in Vlissingen, the Netherlands, was reported to have successfully hatched eggs by a female animal which was not in any contact with a male of the same species.

== Contact with humans ==
Humans have introduced the mangrove monitor to a number of Pacific Islands since the 1930s. They have been present on Ifaluk in the western Caroline Islands since the Second World War. The Japanese introduced the lizards to the Marshall Islands prior to World War II to eliminate rats; the lizards flourished and soon began to raid the local chicken houses. When American troops arrived, the locals asked them for help in getting rid of the mangrove monitors. The US response was to introduce the cane toad (Rhinella marina) which proved toxic to the lizards. As the monitor population dropped, however, the rat population began to rise.

The mangrove monitor is hunted in many places for its skin, which is used for leather in making drum heads. Although international trade in this species is small, Mertens referred to it as one of the most heavily exploited monitor lizards. In 1980, trade in over 13,000 monitors was declared. However, in many remote places, they are used as a food source and are killed because of their reputation for preying on domestic animals.

Mangrove monitors are often kept in zoos and private collections, as they are an active and alert, and generally can be handled if tamed properly. Most specimens defecate on their handlers when stressed. With proper care they can live up to 20 years in captivity.
