= Black-spotted ridge-tailed monitor =

Conservation status
- Least Concern (IUCN 3.1)

Scientific classification
- Kingdom: Animalia
- Phylum: Chordata
- Class: Reptilia
- Order: Squamata
- Suborder: Anguimorpha
- Family: Varanidae
- Genus: Varanus
- Species: V. insulanicus
- Subspecies: V. i. baritji

Trinomial name
- Varanus insulanicus baritji King & Horner, 1987

Species of lizard

The black-spotted ridge-tailed monitor (Varanus insulanicus baritji), also called commonly the black-spotted spiny-tailed monitor, the lemon-throated monitor, the northern ridge-tailed monitor, Whites monitor, and the yellow-throated monitor, is a subspecies of lizard in the family Varanidae. The subspecies is native to Australia's tropical Northern Territory. It is listed as Least Concern on the IUCN Red List as it is considered common and not threatened. It was first described in 1987. It is also known as White's dwarf goanna.

== Etymology ==
The subspecific name, baritji, is an Australian aboriginal word for white, in honour of Australian biological anthropologist Neville White who discovered the species.

== Habitat ==
The preferred natural habitat of V. insulanicus baritji is rocky areas.

== Description ==
V. insulanicus baritji has a spiny tail, and is similar in appearance to Varanus acanthurus, but differs in colour pattern. For example, V. baritji has a bright-yellow underside, but lacks the light and dark dorsal neck stripes and the light ocellated markings on its back for which V. acanthurus is known. The black-spotted ridge-tailed monitor can reach up to 72 centimetres (28 in) in length.

== Reproduction ==
V. insulanicus baritji is oviparous.
