= Monitor lizard =

Monitor lizard Temporal range: Early Miocene – Recent
- Left: V. salvadorii, V. griseus, V. acanthurus, V. olivaceus V. bengalensis Right: V. salvator, V. albigularis, V. spinulosus, V. prasinus, V. jobiensis Bottom: V. komodoensis

Scientific classification
- Kingdom: Animalia
- Phylum: Chordata
- Class: Reptilia
- Order: Squamata
- Suborder: Anguimorpha
- Family: Varanidae
- Genus: Varanus; Merrem, 1820

Type species
- Lacerta varia Shaw, 1790

Subgenera
- Empagusia; Euprepiosaurus; Hapturosaurus; Odatria; Papusaurus; Philippinosaurus; Polydaedalus; Psammosaurus; Solomonsaurus; Soterosaurus; Varanus; For species, see text
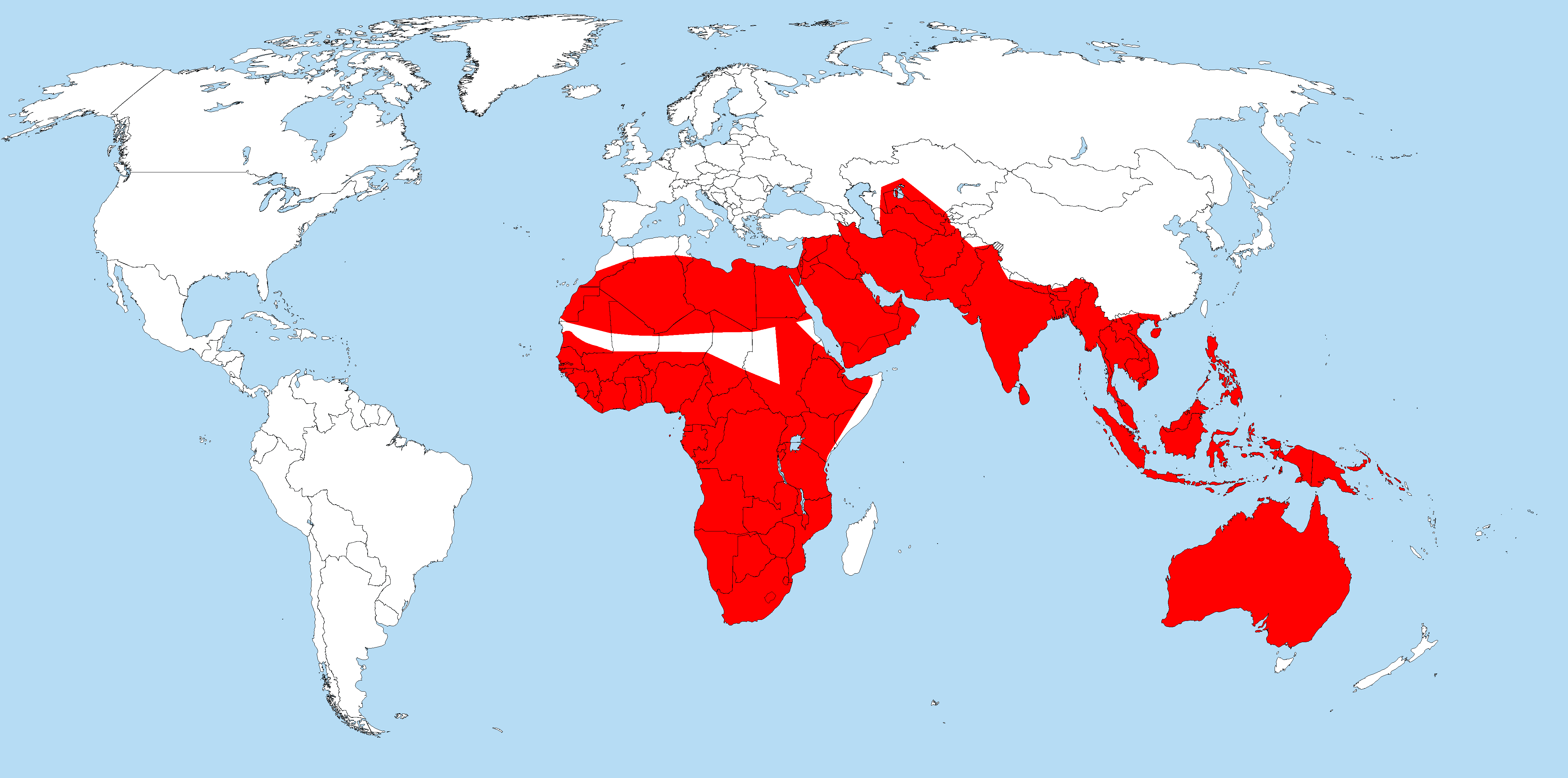
- Combined native range of all the monitor lizards

Genus of reptiles

Monitor lizards are lizards in the genus Varanus, the only extant genus in the family Varanidae. They are native to Africa, Asia, and Oceania, and one species is also found in the southern United States as an invasive species. About 94 species are recognized.

Monitor lizards have long necks, powerful tails and claws, and well-developed limbs. The adult length of extant species ranges from 20 cm (7.9 in) in some species such as Varanus sparnus, to over 3 m (10 ft) in the case of the Komodo dragon, though the extinct megalania (Varanus priscus) may have reached lengths of more than 7 m (23 ft). Most monitor species are terrestrial, but many are also arboreal or semiaquatic. While most monitor lizards are carnivorous, eating smaller reptiles, fish, birds, insects, small mammals, and eggs, a few species also eat fruit and vegetation.

== Etymology ==
The generic name Varanus is derived from the Arabic word ورل waral (Standard Arabic, colloquially ورر warar or ورن waran), from a common Semitic root ouran, waran, warar or waral, meaning "lizard beast".

In English, they are known as "monitors" or "monitor lizards". The earlier term "monitory lizard" became rare by about 1920. The name may have been suggested by the occasional habit of varanids to stand on their two hind legs and to appear to "monitor", or perhaps from their supposed habit of "warning people of the approach of venomous animals". But all of these explanations for the name "monitor" postdate Linnaeus giving the scientific name Lacerta monitor to the Nile monitor in 1758, which may have been based on a mistaken idea by Linnaeus that the German word Waran (borrowed from Arabic) was connected to warnen (to warn) or barely related to Ancient Greek word οὐρανός (ouranós, lit. "sky"), leading him to incorrectly Latinize it as monitor ('warner' or 'adviser').

Austronesian languages spoken across Southeast Asia, where varanids are common, have a large number of slightly related local names for them. They are usually known as biawak (Malay, including Indonesian standard variety), bayawak (Filipino, Sundanese), binjawak or minjawak or nyambik (Javanese), or variations thereof. Other names include hokai (Solomon Islands); bwo, puo, or soa (Maluku); halo (Cebu); galuf or kaluf (Micronesia and the Caroline Islands); batua or butaan (Luzon); alu (Bali); hora or ghora (Komodo group of islands); phut (Burmese); and guibang (Manobo).

In South Asia, they are known as hangkok in Meitei, mwpou in Boro, ghorpad (घोरपड) in Marathi, uḍumbu (உடும்பு) in Tamil and udumbu (ഉടുമ്പ്) in Malayalam, bilgoh in Bhojpuri, gohi (गोहि) in Maithili, in Sinhala as තලගොයා / කබරගොයා (talagoya [land monitor] / kabaragoya [water monitor, where 'kabara' means 'vitiligo']), in Telugu as uḍumu (ఉడుము), in Kannada as uḍa (ಉಡ), in Punjabi and Magahi as goh (गोह), in Assamese as gui xaap, in Odia as godhi (ଗୋଧି), and in Bengali as (goshaap) (গোসাপ) or (guishaap) (গুইসাপ), as goh (गोह) in Hindi, and godhā (गोधा) in Sanskrit.

The West African Nile monitor is known by several names in Yoruba, including awọ́nríwọ́n, awọ̀n, and àlégbà. In Serer and amongst the Wolofized Serers of Kaolack, it is known as mbossé (or mboose in Serer) or bar in Wolof (pronounced barrr with a long "R"). Mbossé is the tutelary and traditional totem of the city of Kaolack, (formerly part of the Serer precolonial Kingdom of Saloum, now part of modern-day Senegal). The mbossé is also one of the totems of the noble Joof family born of Guelwar matrilineage, which is one of the many Serer maternal clans. The mbossé or mbosseh (in Gambian English) is one of the Serer religious festivals, and should not be confused with the mythical and sacred tree mbos―enshrined in Serer religion and Serer cosmogony―where the mbossé (the lizard) takes its name.

Due to confusion with the large New World lizards of the family Iguanidae, the lizards became known as "goannas" in Australia. Similarly, in South African English, they are referred to as leguaans, or likkewaans, from the Dutch term for the Iguanidae, leguanen.

== Distribution ==
The various species cover a vast area, occurring through Africa, the Indian subcontinent, to China, the Ryukyu Islands in southern Japan, south to Southeast Asia to Thailand, Malaysia, Brunei, Indonesia, the Philippines, New Guinea, Australia, and islands of the Indian Ocean and the South China Sea. They have also been introduced outside of their natural range, for instance, the West African Nile monitor is now found in South Florida. Monitor lizards also occurred widely in Europe in the Neogene, with the last known remains in the region dating to the Middle Pleistocene.

== Habits and diet ==
Most monitor lizards are almost entirely carnivorous, consuming prey as varied as insects, crustaceans, arachnids, myriapods, molluscs, fish, amphibians, reptiles, birds, and mammals. Most species feed on invertebrates as juveniles and shift to feeding on vertebrates as adults. Deer make up about 50% of the diet of adult Komodo dragons, the largest monitor species. In contrast, three arboreal species from the Philippines, Varanus bitatawa, V. mabitang, and V. olivaceus, are primarily fruit eaters.

== Biology ==
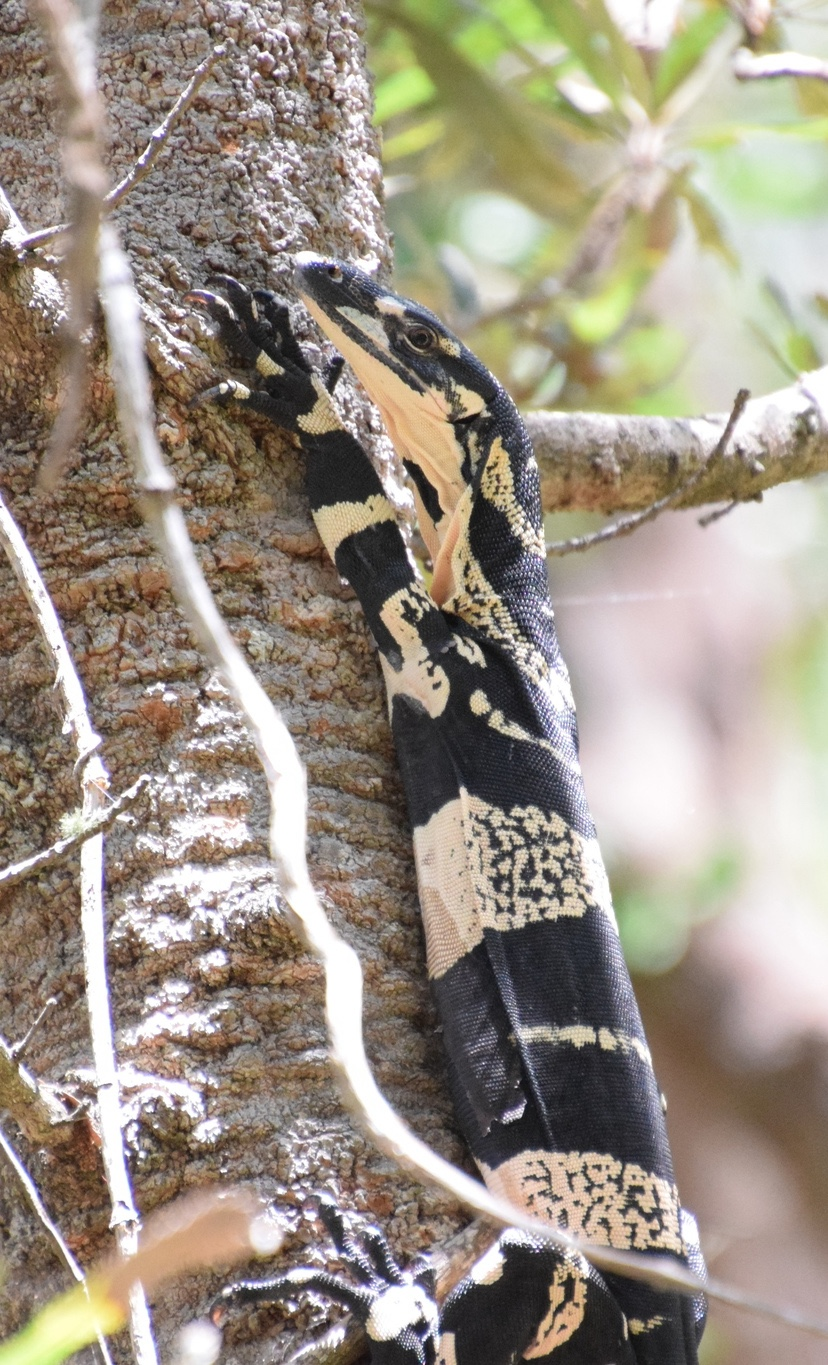
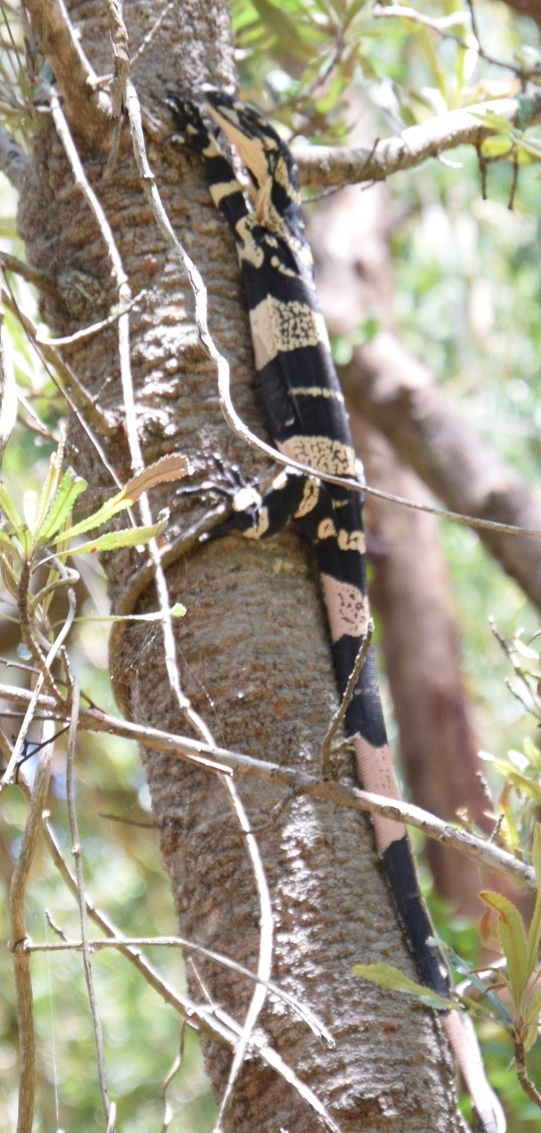
A Bell's phase lace monitor in a tree

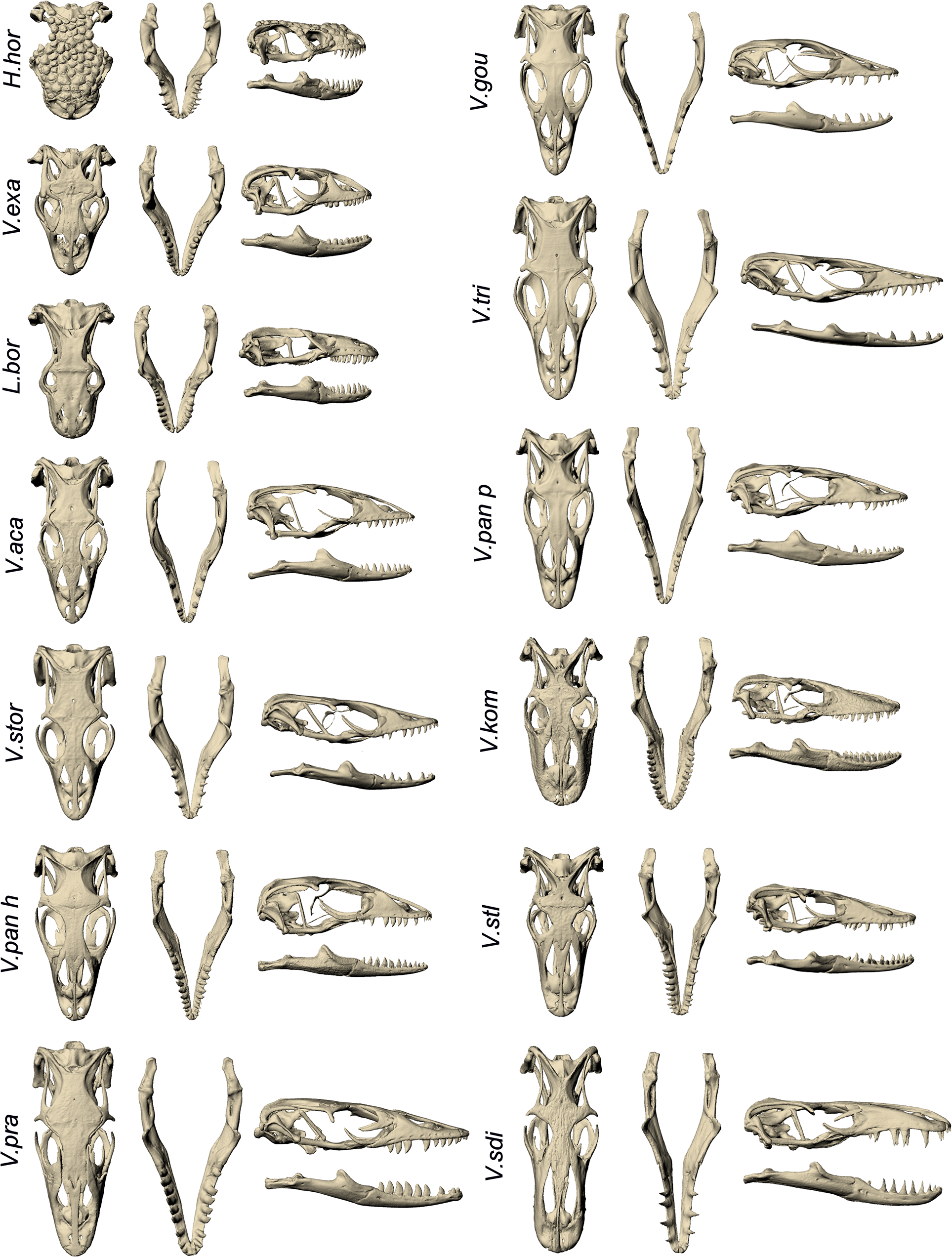
Skulls of various varanoids

Monitor lizards are considered unique among animals in that its members are relatively morphologically conservative, yet show a very large size range. However, finer morphological features such as the shape of the skull and limbs do vary, and are strongly related to the ecology of each species.

Like snakes, monitor lizards have highly forked tongues that act as part of the "smell" sense, where the tips of the tongue carry molecules from the environment to the a sensory organ in the skull called the Jacobson's organ. The forked apparatus allows for these lizards to sense boundaries in the molecules they collect, almost smelling in "stereo". While most reptiles possess taste buds, monitor lizards and likely snakes as well completely lack taste buds. Merten's water monitor, the most aquatically adapted monitor species, is uniquely capable of using its sense of smell underwater to locate and capture prey.

Monitor lizards are oviparous, laying from seven to 38 eggs, which they often cover with soil or protect in a hollow tree stump. Some species, including the Komodo dragon, are capable of parthenogenesis.

=== Venom ===
Anatomical and molecular studies indicate that most if not all varanids are venomous. Unlike snakes, monitor lizard venom glands are situated in their lower jaw. The venom of monitor lizards is diverse and complex, as a result of the diverse ecological niches monitor lizards occupy.

For example, many species have anticoagulant venom, disrupting clotting through a combination of fibrinogenolysis and blocking platelet aggregation. Amongst them, arboreal species, such as the tree monitors and the banded monitor, have by far the strongest fibrinogenolytic venom. As a result, wounds from monitor lizard bites often bleed more than they would if they were simply lacerations. Venom may also cause hypotension.

In some species, such as the Komodo dragon and the desert monitor, the venom also induces a powerful neurotoxic effect. In the latter species, for instance, envenomation causes immediate paralysis in rodents (but not birds) and lesser effects of the same nature in humans.

=== Metabolism ===
Monitor lizards maintain large territories and employ active-pursuit hunting techniques that are reminiscent of similar-sized mammals. The highly active nature of monitor lizards has led to numerous studies on the metabolic capacities of these lizards. The general consensus is that monitor lizards have the highest standard metabolic rates of all extant reptiles.

Monitor lizards have a high aerobic scope that is afforded, in part, by their heart anatomy. Whereas most reptiles are considered to have three-chambered hearts, the hearts of monitor lizards – as with those of boas and pythons – have a well developed ventricular septum that completely separates the pulmonary and systemic sides of the circulatory system during systole. This allows monitor lizards to create mammalian-equivalent pressure differentials between the pulmonary and systemic circuits, which in turn ensure that oxygenated blood is quickly distributed to the body without also flooding the lungs with high-pressure blood.

== Intelligence ==
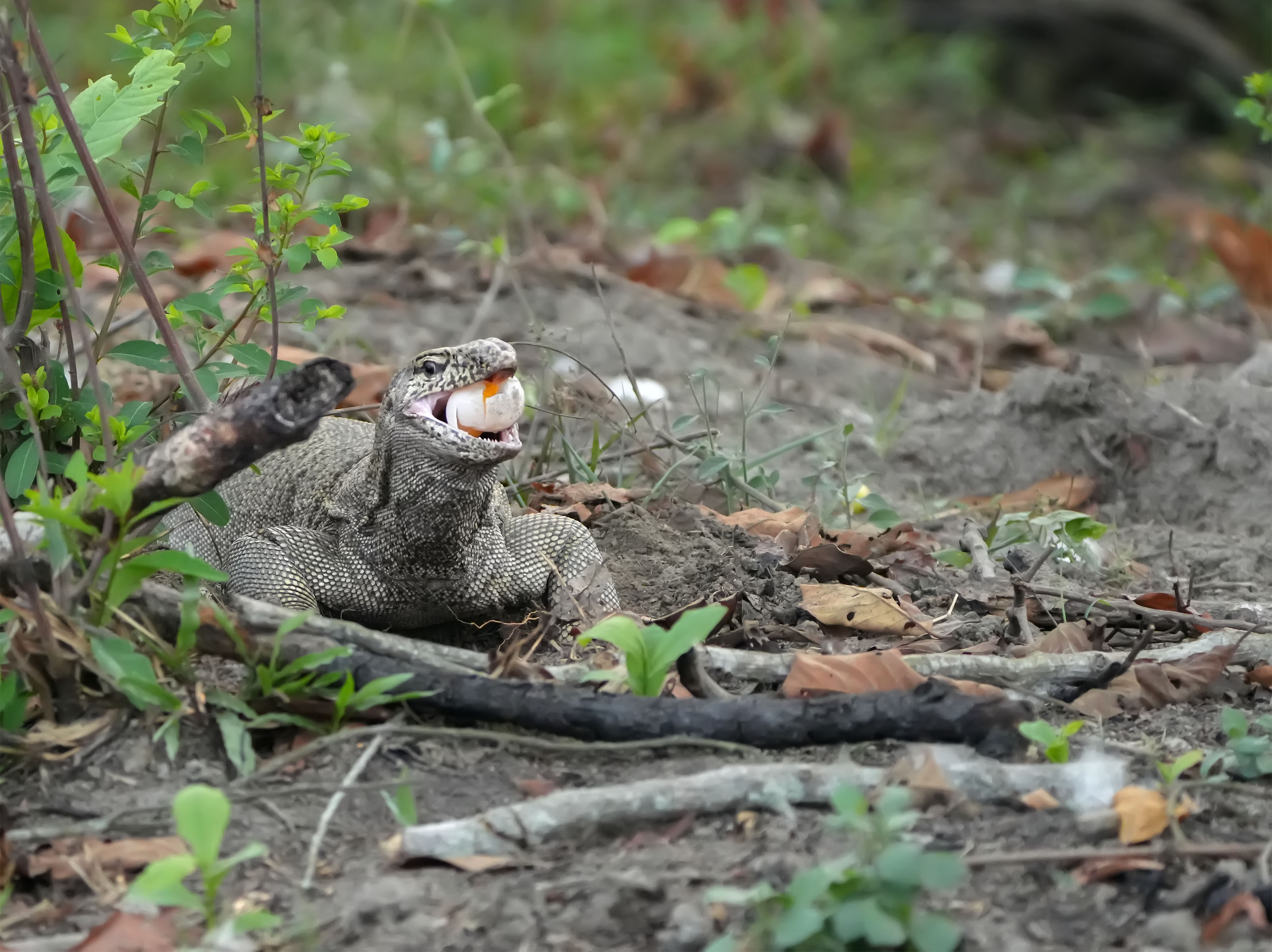
A Bengal monitor eating a bird egg in Kaziranga National Park

At least some species of monitors are known to be able to count; studies feeding rock monitors varying numbers of snails showed that they can distinguish numbers up to six. Nile monitors have been observed to cooperate when foraging; one animal lures the female crocodile away from her nest, while the other opens the nest to feed on the eggs. The decoy then returns to also feed on the eggs. Komodo dragons at the National Zoo in Washington, DC, recognize their keepers and seem to have distinct personalities. Blue and green tree monitors in British zoos have been observed shredding leaves, apparently as a form of play.

== Human uses ==
=== As pets ===
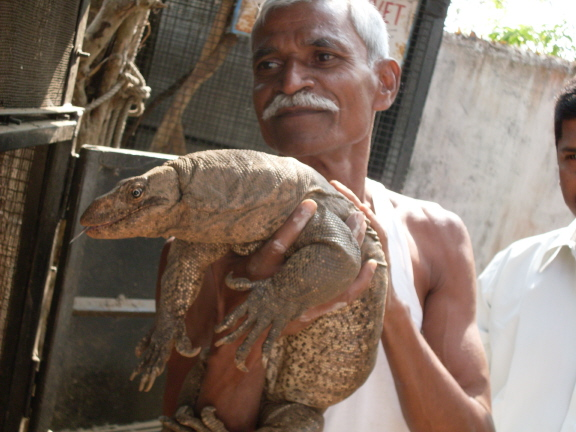
Injured Bengal monitor being nursed at the Lok Biradari Prakalp in India

Monitor lizards have become a staple in the reptile pet trade. The most commonly kept monitors are the savannah monitor and Ackie dwarf monitor, due to their relatively small size, low cost, and relatively calm dispositions with regular handling. Among others, black-throated, Timor, Asian water, Nile, mangrove, emerald tree, black tree, roughneck, Dumeril's, peach-throated, crocodile, and Argus monitors have been kept in captivity.

=== Traditional medicines ===
Monitor lizards are poached in some South- and Southeast Asian countries, as their organs and fat are used in some traditional medicines, although there is no scientific evidence as to their effectiveness.

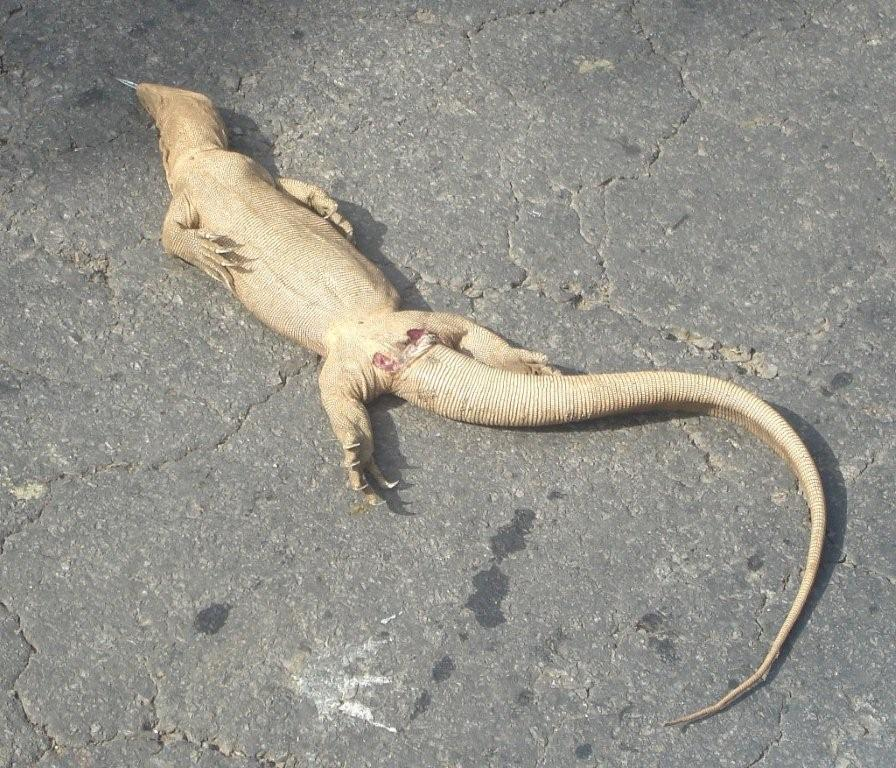
A dead monitor in India, with its hemipenes removed. Monitor hemipenes are often trafficked and illegally sold.

The dried and dyed hemipenes of Bengal monitors, and less often yellow and water monitors, are frequently trafficked and illegally sold in India and online under the deceptive term 'Hatha Jodi', where it is claimed to be the root of a supposed rare Himalayan plant in order to fool buyers and retailers, and to disguise the trade from wildlife authorities. Sellers advertise 'Hatha Jodi' as having the tantric power to bring wealth, power and contentment. A pair of hemipenes may sell at a value of up to US$250. In India, the body oil of monitor lizards is sold for thousands of Indian rupees to residents in metropolitan cities as a treatment for rheumatism.

Monitor lizard meat, particularly the tongue and liver, is eaten in parts of India and Malaysia and is supposed to be an aphrodisiac.

Consuming raw blood and flesh of monitor lizards has been reported to cause eosinophilic meningoencephalitis, as some monitors are hosts for the parasitic nematode Angiostrongylus cantonensis.

=== Leather ===
"Large-scale exploitation" of monitor lizards is undertaken for their skins, which are described as being "of considerable utility" in the leather industry. In Papua New Guinea, monitor lizard leather is used for membranes in traditional drums (called kundu), and these lizards are referred to as kundu palai or "drum lizard" in Tok Pisin, the main Papuan trade language. Monitor lizard skins are prized in making the resonant part of serjas (Bodo folk sarangis) and dotaras (native strummed string instruments of Assam, Bengal and other eastern states). The leather is also used in making a Carnatic music percussion instrument called the kanjira.

=== Food ===
The meat of monitor lizards is eaten by some tribes in India, Nepal, the Philippines, Australia, South Africa, and West Africa as a supplemental meat source. Both meat and eggs are also eaten in Southeast Asian countries such as Vietnam and Thailand as a delicacy.

== Conservation ==
According to IUCN Red List of threatened species, most of the monitor lizards species fall in the categories of least concern, but the population is decreasing globally. All but five species of monitor lizards are classified by the Convention on International Trade in Endangered Species of Wild Fauna and Flora under Appendix II, which is loosely defined as species that are not necessarily threatened with extinction but may become so unless trade in such species is subject to strict regulation to avoid use incompatible with the survival of the species in the wild. The remaining five species – the Bengal, yellow, desert, and clouded monitors and the Komodo Dragon– are classified under CITES Appendix I, which outlaws international commercial trade in the species.

The yellow monitor is protected in all countries in its range except Bhutan, Nepal, India, Pakistan, and Bangladesh.

In Kerala, Andhra Pradesh, Karnataka, Telangana and all other parts of South India, catching or killing of monitor lizards is banned under the Protected Species Act.

== Evolution ==
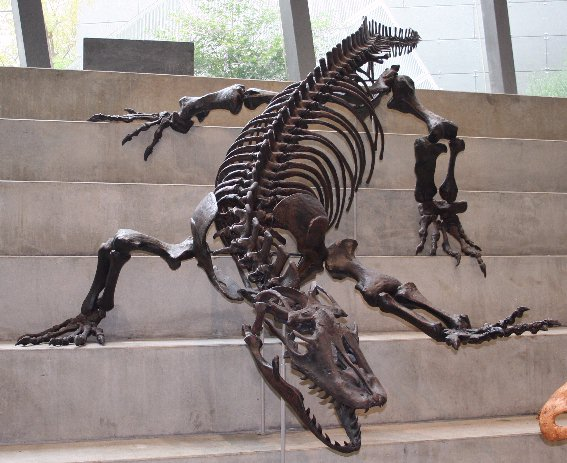
The giant extinct megalania (Varanus priscus)

Varanus is the only living genus of the family Varanidae. Varanids last shared a common ancestor with their closest living relatives, earless "monitors", during the Late Cretaceous. The oldest known varanids are from the Late Cretaceous of Mongolia. During the Eocene, the varanid Saniwa occurred in North America. The closest known relative of Varanus is Archaeovaranus from the Eocene of China, suggesting that the genus Varanus is of Asian origin. The oldest fossils of Varanus date to the early Miocene.

Many of the species within the various subgenera also form species complexes with each other:

Euprepriosaurus

- V. indicus species complex (V. indicus, V. cerambonensis, V. caerulivirens, V. colei, V. obor, V. lirugensis, V. rainerguentheri, V. zugorum)
- V. doreanus species complex (V. doreanus, V. finschi, V. semotus, V. yuwonoi)
- V. jobiensis species complex (V. jobiensis)

Odatria

- V. acanthurus species complex (V. acanthurus, V. baritji, V. primordius, V. storri)
- V. timorensis species complex (V. timorensis, V. auffenbergi, V. scalaris, V. similis, V. tristis)

Varanus

- V. gouldii species complex (V. gouldii, V. rosenbergi, V. panoptes)

Polydaedalus

- V. exanthematicus species complex (V. exanthematicus, V. albigularis, V. yemenensis)
- V. niloticus species complex (V. niloticus, V. stellatus)

Empagusia

- V. bengalensis species complex (V. bengalensis, V. nebulosus)

Soterosaurus

- V. salvator species complex (V. salvator, V. cumingi, V. nuchalis, V. togianus, V. marmoratus)

The tree monitors of the V. prasinus species complex (V. prasinus, V. beccarii, V. boehmei, V. bogerti, V. keithhornei, V. kordensis, V. macraei, V. reisingeri, V. telenesetes) were once in the subgenus Euprepriosaurus, but as of 2016, form their own subgenus Hapturosaurus.

V. jobiensis was once considered to be a member of the V. indicus species complex, but is now considered to represent its own species complex.

Phylogeny as of Brennan et al. 2020
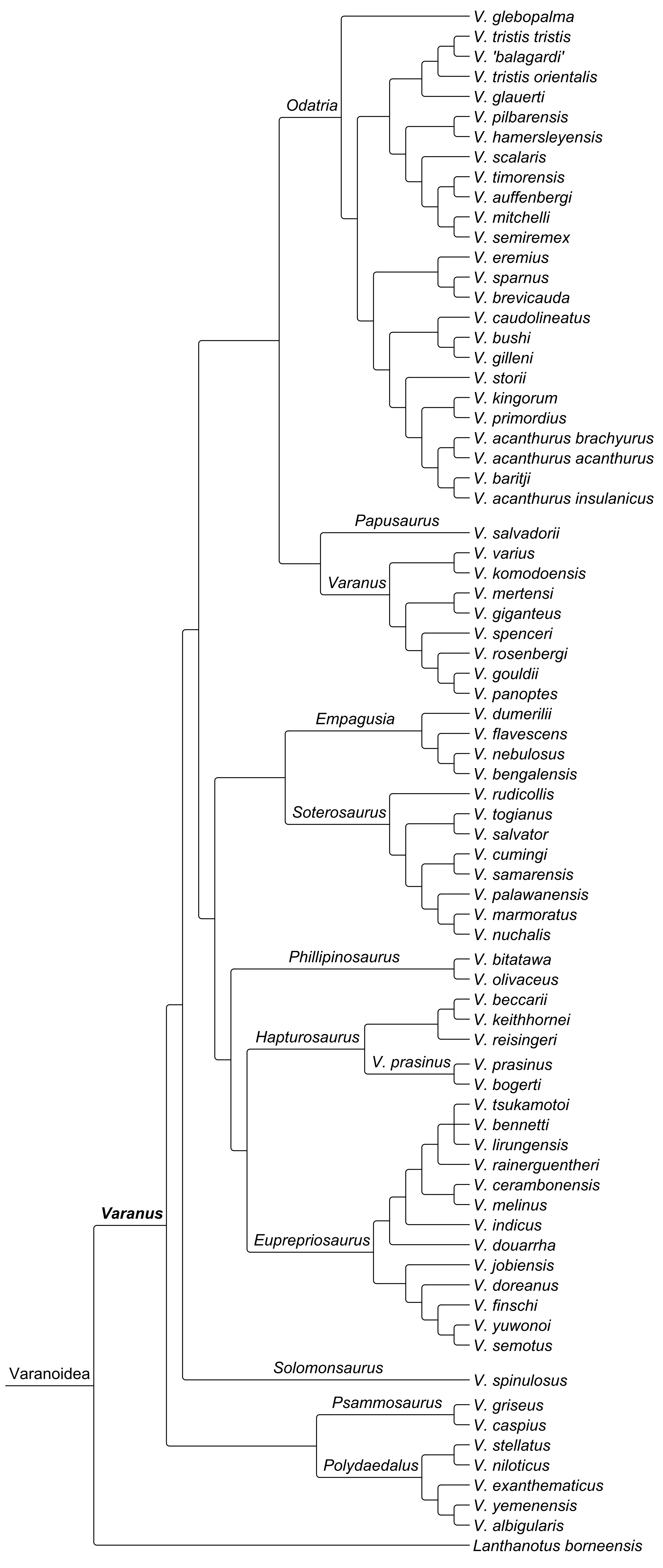

== Taxonomy ==
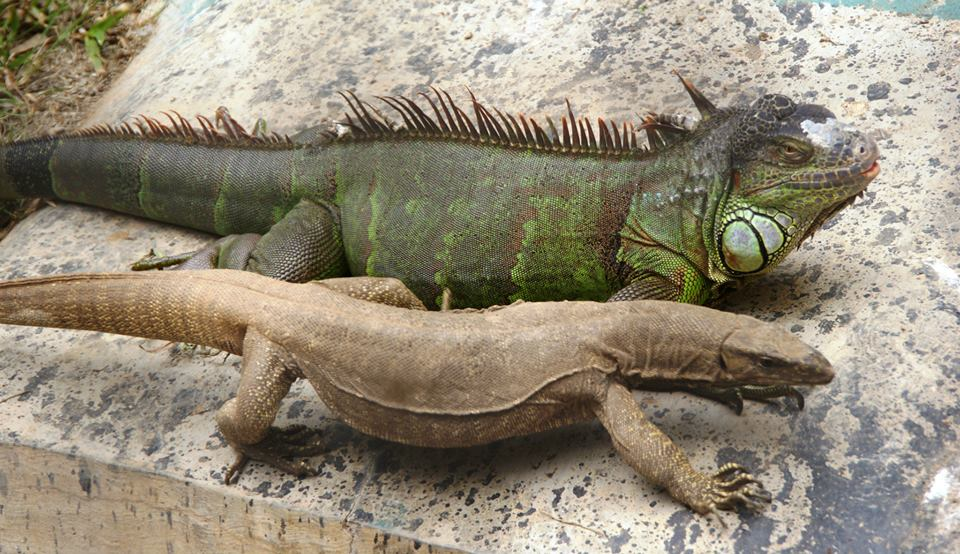
Bengal monitor (V. bengalensis) with green iguana (Iguana iguana)

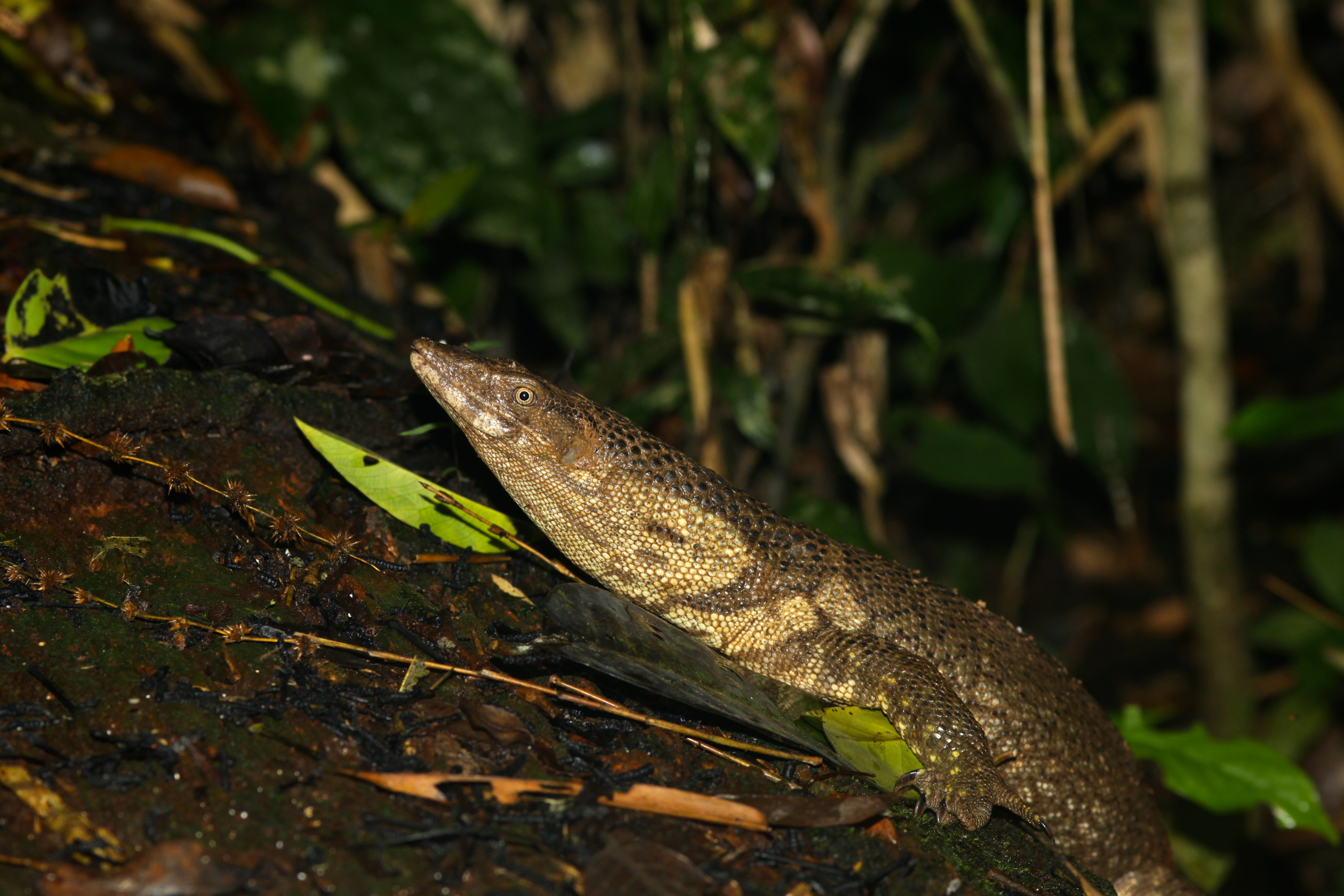
Dumeril's monitor (V. dumerilii)

Genus Varanus

Species marked with † are extinct

- †V. bolkayi
- †V. darevskii
- †V. emeritus (=V. salvadorii?)
- †V. hooijeri
- †V. hofmanni
- †V. lungui
- †V. mokrensis
- †V. pronini
- †V. semjonovi
- †V. sivalensis
- †V. tyrasiensis (=V. hofmanni?)

Subgenus Empagusia:

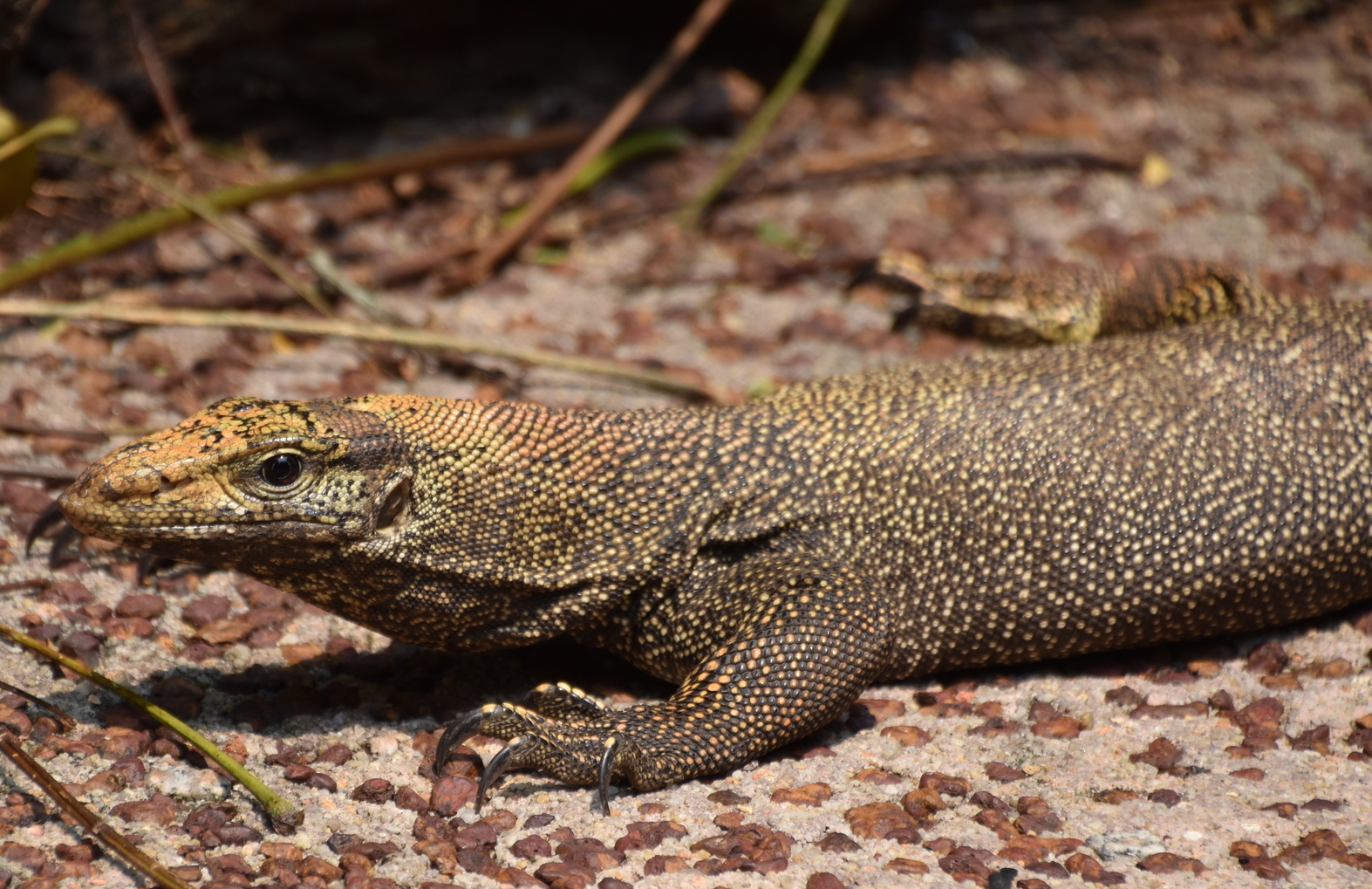
Clouded monitor (V. nebulosus)

- †V. marathonensis
- V. bengalensis, Bengal monitor
- V. dumerilii, Dumeril's monitor, brown roughneck monitor
- V. flavescens, golden monitor, yellow monitor, short-toed monitor
- V. nebulosus, clouded monitor

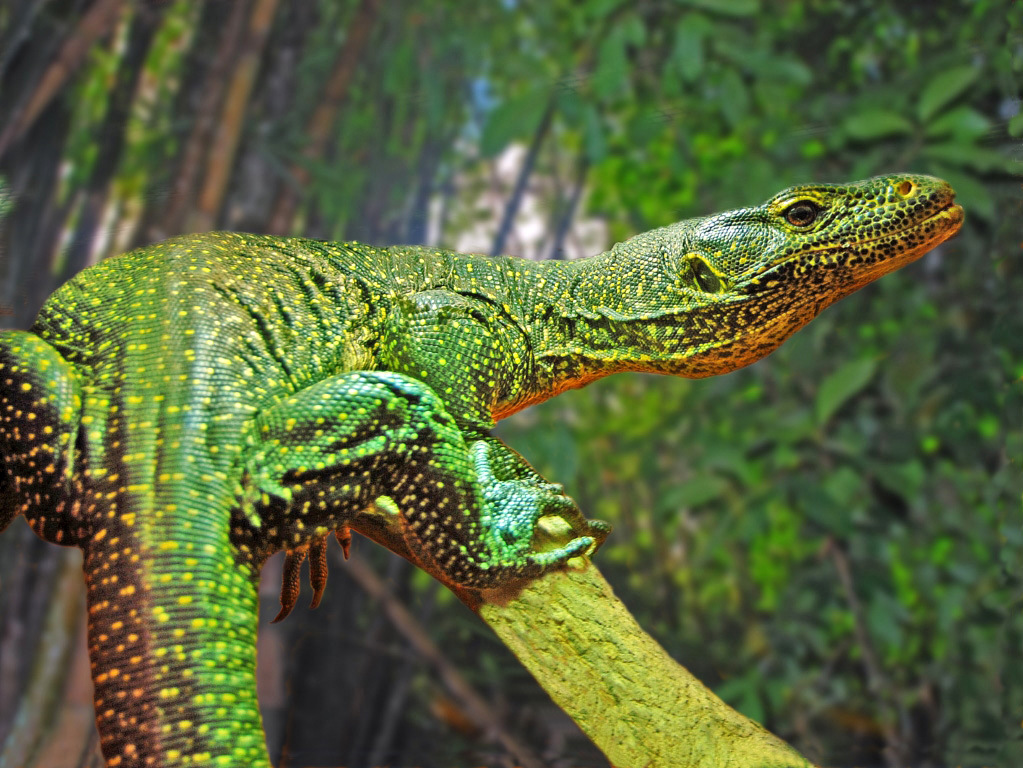
Blue-tailed monitor (V. doreanus)

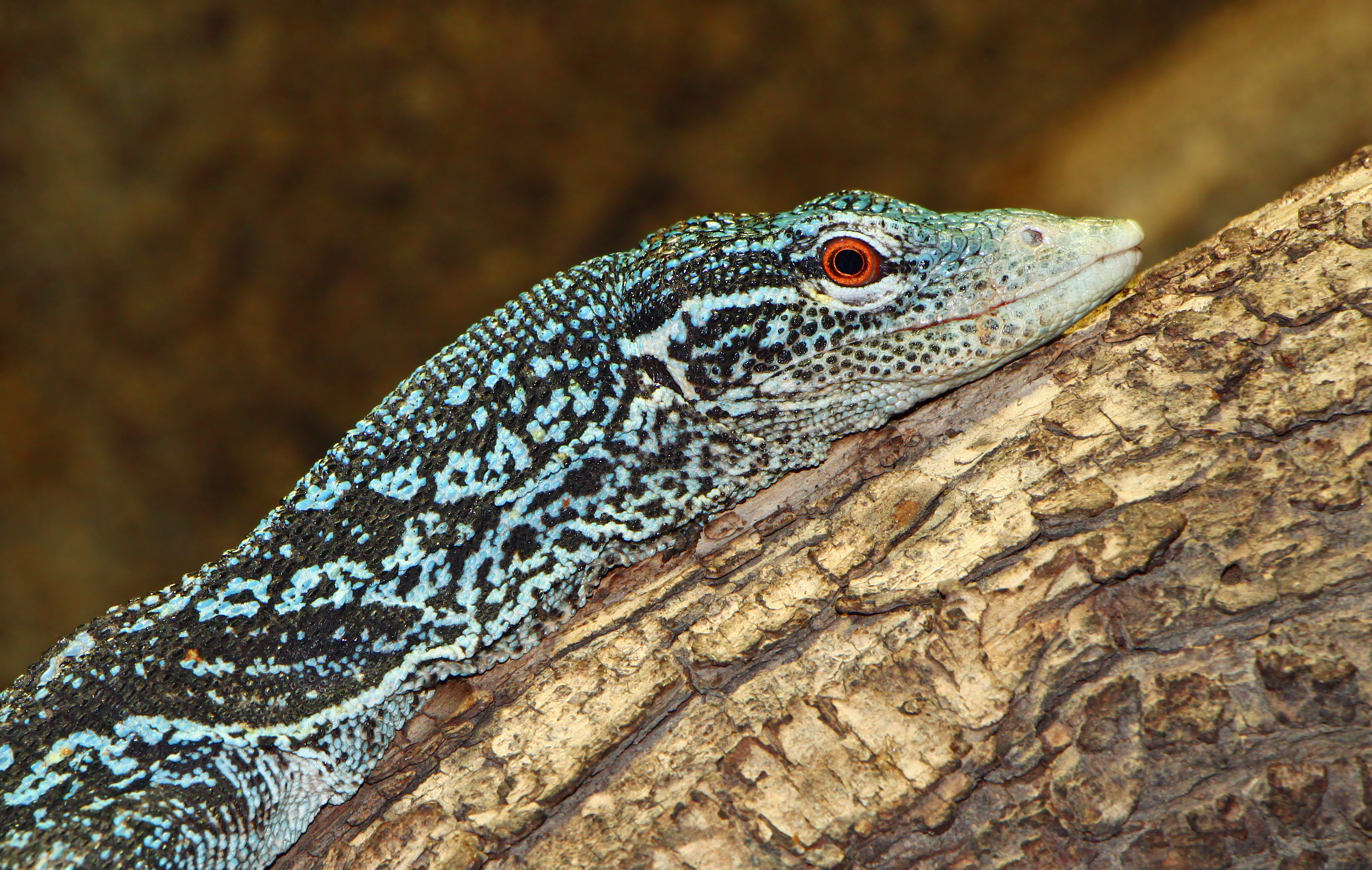
Blue-spotted tree monitor (V. macraei)

Subgenus Euprepiosaurus:

- V. bennetti, Bennett's long-tailed monitor
- V. caerulivirens, turquoise monitor
- V. cerambonensis, Ceram monitor
- V. colei Kei Islands monitor
- V. doreanus, blue-tailed monitor
- V. douarrha, New Ireland monitor
- V. finschi, Finsch's monitor
- V. indicus, mangrove monitor
- V. chlorostigma, mangrove goanna
- V. jobiensis, peach-throated monitor
- V. juxtindicus, Rennell Island monitor
- V. lirungensis, Talaud mangrove monitor
- V. louisiadensis, Louisiade monitor
- V. melinus, quince monitor
- V. obor, sago monitor
- V. rainerguentheri Rainer Günther's monitor
- V. semotus, Mussau Island blue-tailed monitor
- V. tanimbar, Tanimbar monitor
- V. tsukamotoi, Mariana monitor
- V. yuwonoi black-backed mangrove monitor, tricolor monitor
- V. zugorum, silver monitor, Zug's monitor

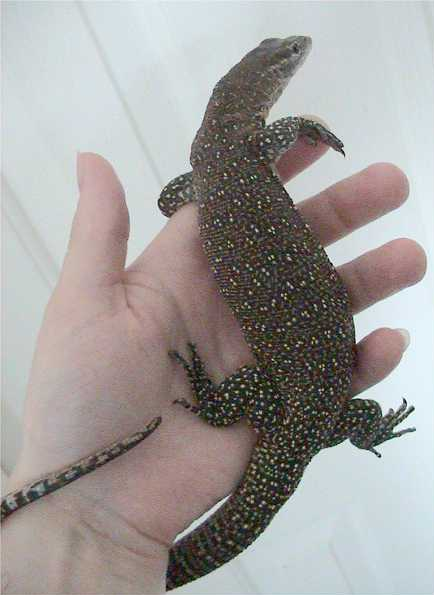
Timor tree monitor (V. timorensis)

Subgenus Hapturosaurus:

- V. beccarii, black tree monitor
- V. boehmei, golden-spotted tree monitor
- V. bogerti, Bogert's monitor
- V. keithhornei, canopy goanna, blue-nosed tree monitor, Nesbit River monitor
- V. kordensis, Biak tree monitor
- V. macraei, blue-spotted tree monitor
- V. prasinus, emerald tree monitor
- V. reisingeri yellow tree monitor
- V. telenesetes, mysterious tree monitor, Rossell tree monitor

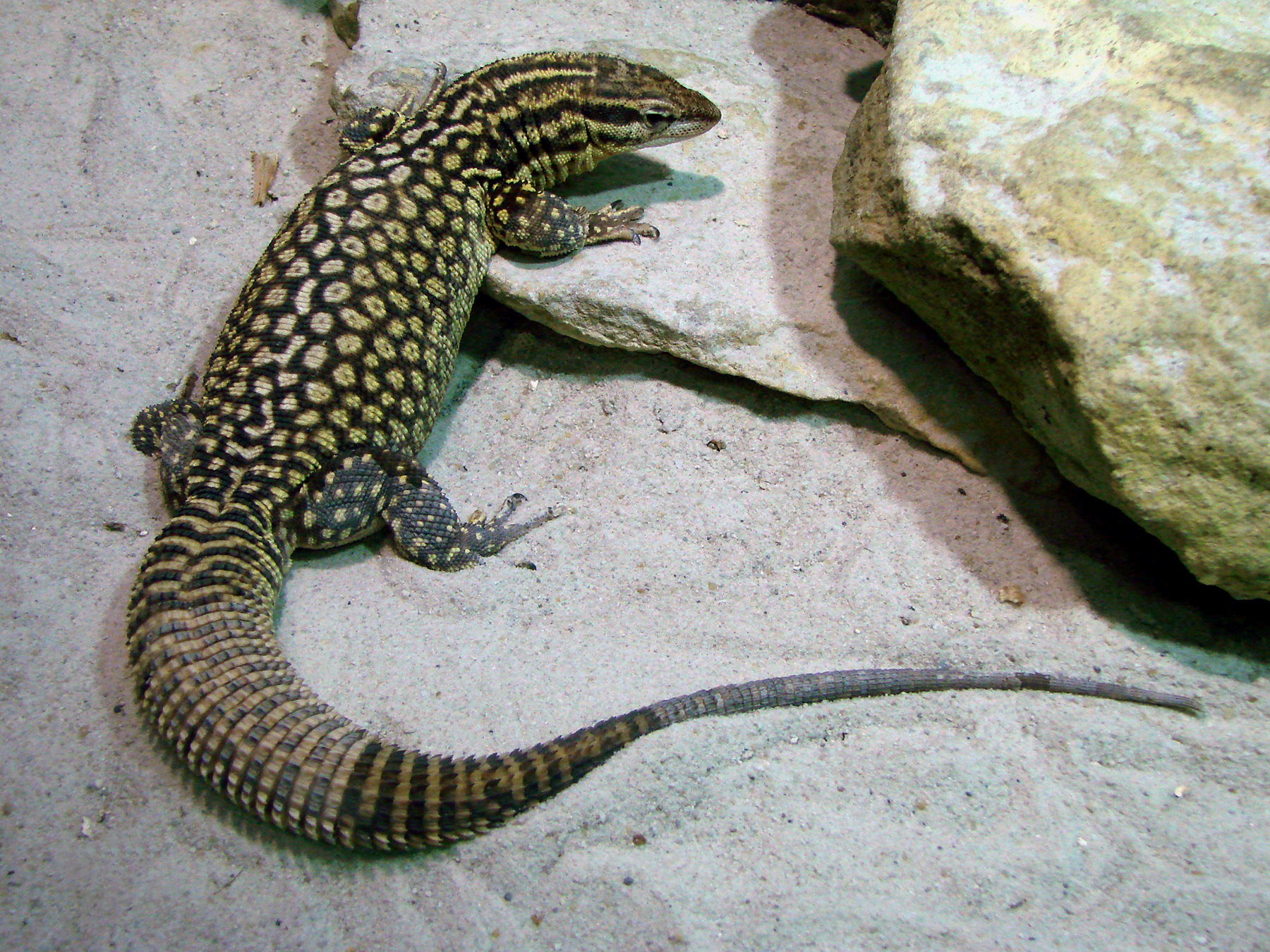
Ridge-tailed monitor (V. acanthurus)

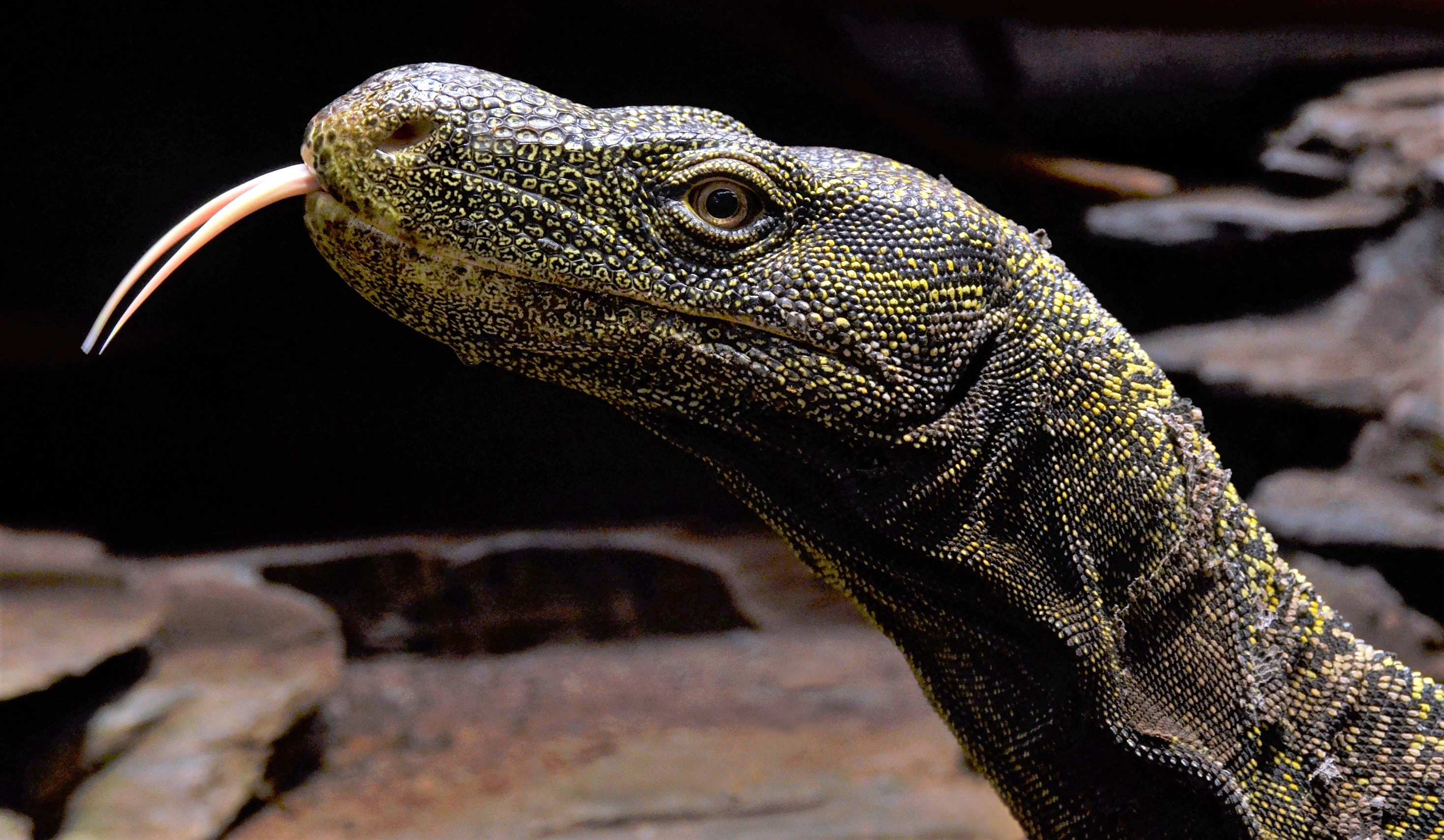
Crocodile monitor (V. salvadorii)

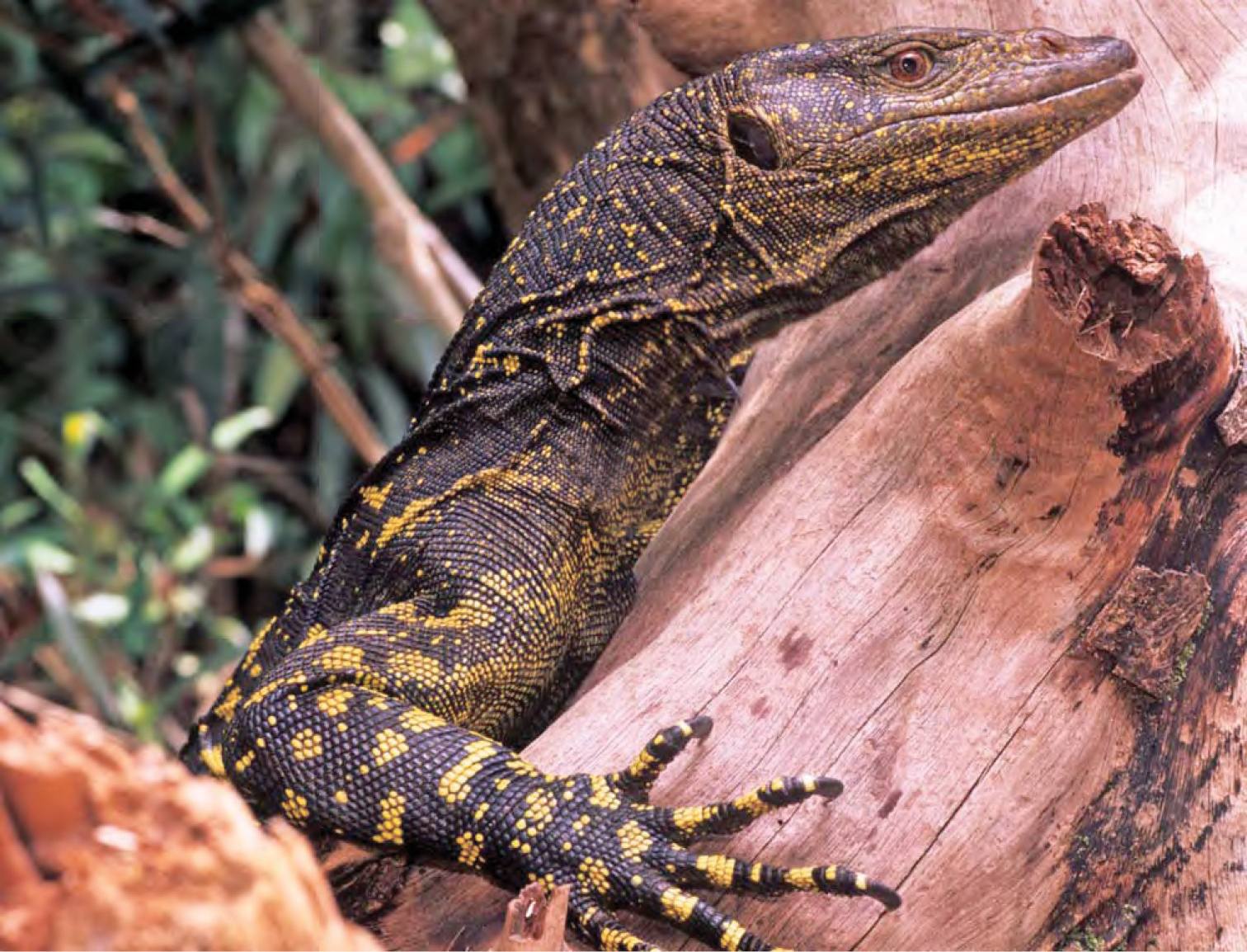
Northern Sierra Madre forest monitor (V. bitatawa)

Subgenus Odatria:

- V. acanthurus, spiny-tailed monitor, ridge-tailed monitor, Ackie's dwarf monitor
  - V. a. acanthurus, spiny-tailed monitor
  - V. a. brachyurus, common spiny-tailed monitor
- V. auffenbergi, Auffenberg's monitor, peacock monitor
- V. brevicauda, short-tailed monitor
- V. bushi, Pilbara stripe-tailed monitor, Bush's monitor
- V. caudolineatus, stripe-tailed monitor
- V. citrinus, Gulf ridge-tailed monitor
- V. delcantoi Patschke, Koch, Schmitz & Böhme, 2025
- V. eremius, rusty desert monitor, pygmy desert monitor
- V. gilleni, pygmy mulga monitor
- V. glauerti, Kimberley rock monitor
- V. glebopalma, twilight monitor, black-palmed rock monitor
- V. hamersleyensis, Hamersley Range rock monitor
- V. insulanicus, Groote Eylandt monitor
  - V. i. baritji, black-spotted ridge-tailed monitor
- V. iridis Zozaya, Read, Macor, Pavón-Vázquez, Gale, Wright & Broady, 2026
- V. kingorum, Kings' rock monitor
- V. mitchelli, Mitchell's water monitor
- V. ocreatus, Storr's monitor
- V. phosphoros Zozaya, Read, Macor, Pavón-Vázquez, Gale, Wright & Broady, 2026
- V. pilbarensis, Pilbara rock monitor
- V. primordius northern blunt-spined monitor
- V. scalaris, banded tree monitor
- V. semiremex rusty monitor
- V. similis, Similis monitor, spotted tree monitor
- V. sparnus, Dampier Peninsula monitor
- V. storri, eastern Storr's monitor
- V. timorensis, Timor monitor
- V. tristis
  - V. t. tristis, black-headed monitor
  - V. t. orientalis, freckled monitor
- V. umbra Zozaya, Read, Macor, Pavón-Vázquez, Gale, Wright & Broady, 2026

Subgenus Papusaurus

- V. salvadorii, crocodile monitor

Subgenus Philippinosaurus:

- V. bitatawa, northern Sierra Madre forest monitor, butikaw, bitatawa
- V. mabitang, Panay monitor, mabitang
- V. olivaceus, Gray's monitor, butaan

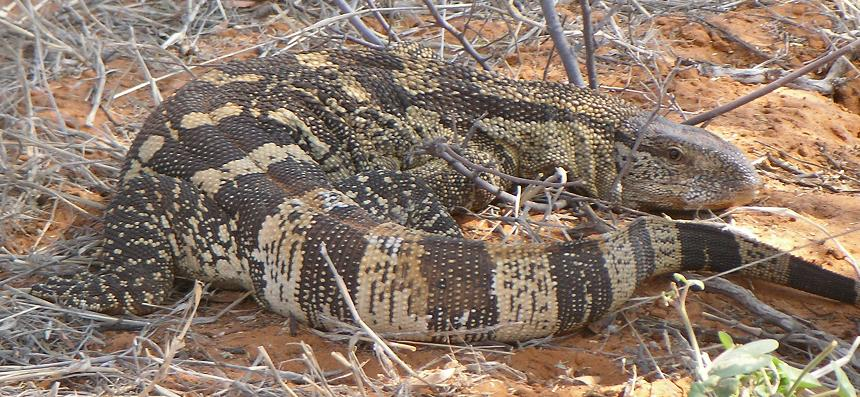
White-throated monitor (V. a. albigularis) on the Kalahari savannah

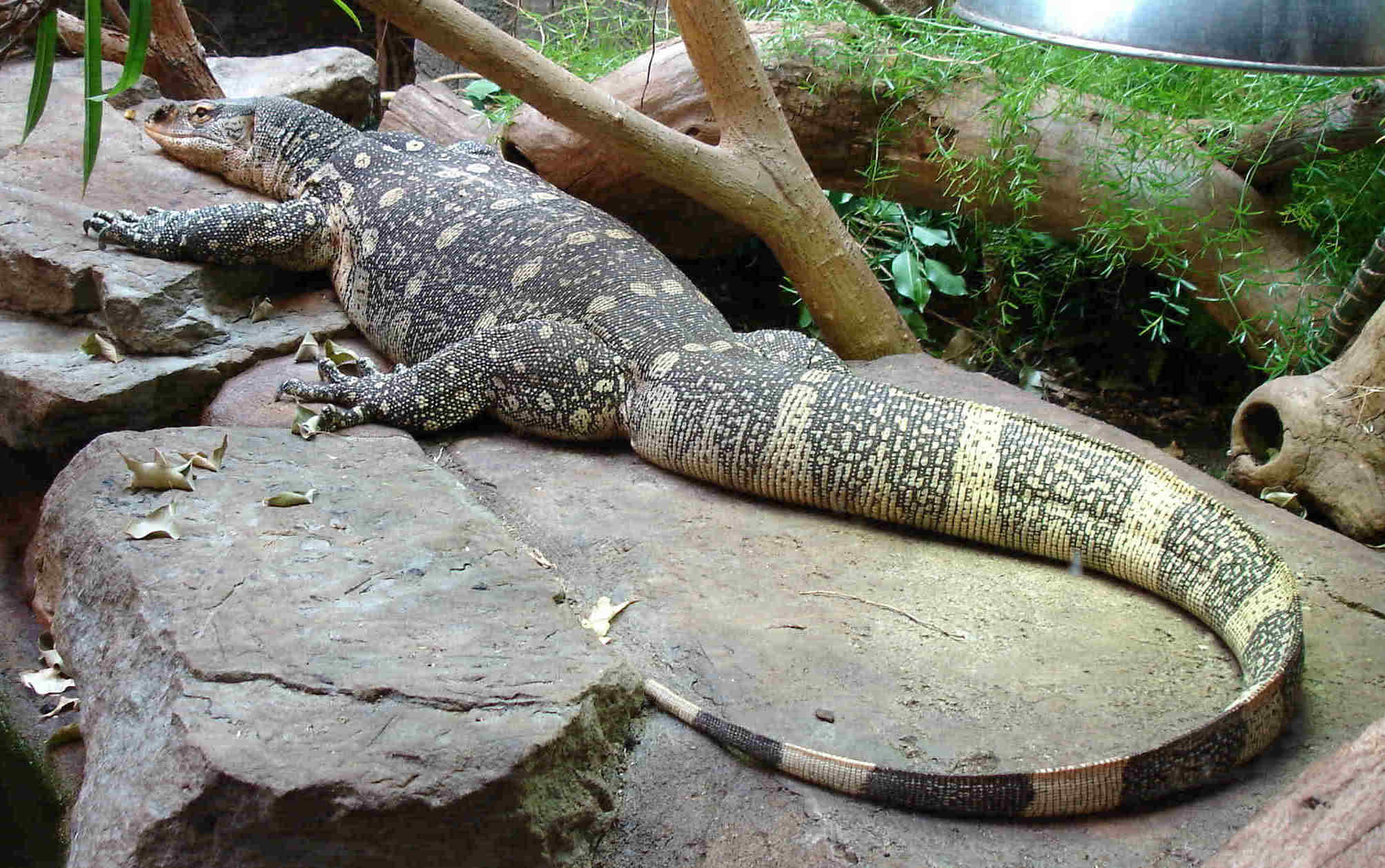
"Ornate monitor", "V. ornatus"

Subgenus Polydaedalus:

- †V. rusingensis
- †V. varswater
- V. albigularis, rock monitor, white-throated monitor
  - V. a. albigularis, white-throated monitor
  - V. a. angolensis, Angolan monitor
  - V. a. microstictus, black-throated monitor
- V. exanthematicus, savannah monitor, Bosc's monitor
- V. niloticus, Nile monitor
- V. stellatus, West African Nile monitor
- V. ornatus, ornate monitor
- V. yemenensis, Yemen monitor

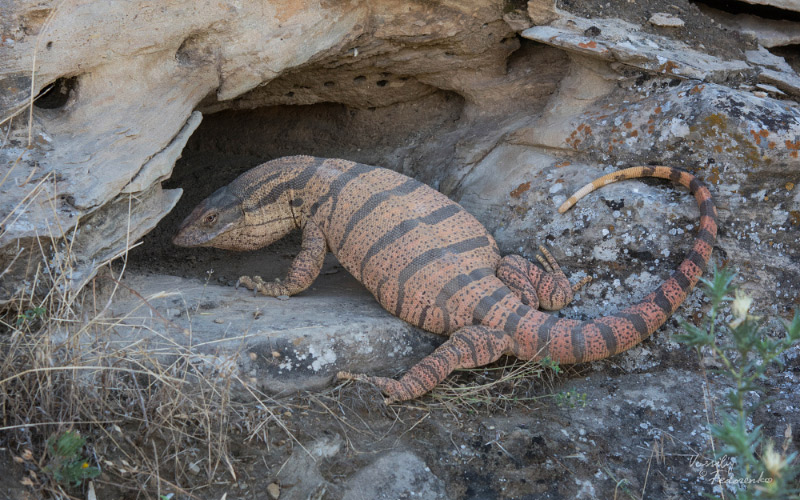
Caspian monitor (V. g. caspius)

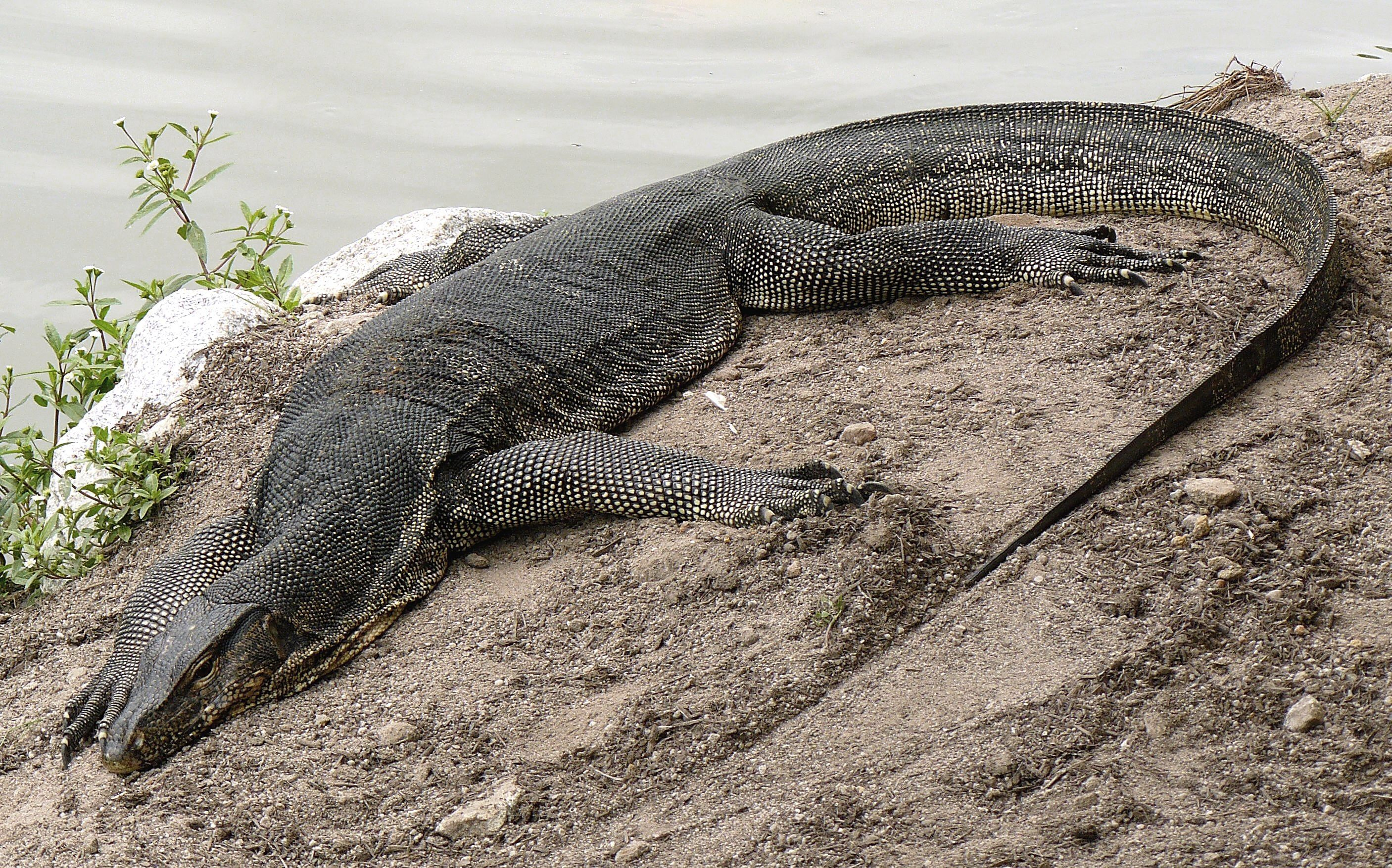
Water monitor (V. salvator)

Subgenus Psammosaurus:

- V. griseus, desert monitor
  - V. g. griseus, desert monitor, grey monitor
  - V. g. caspius, Caspian monitor
  - V. g. koniecznyi, Indian desert monitor, Thar desert monitor
- V. nesterovi, Nesterov's desert monitor

Subgenus Solomonsaurus:

- V. spinulosus, spiny-necked mangrove monitor, Solomon Islands spiny monitor

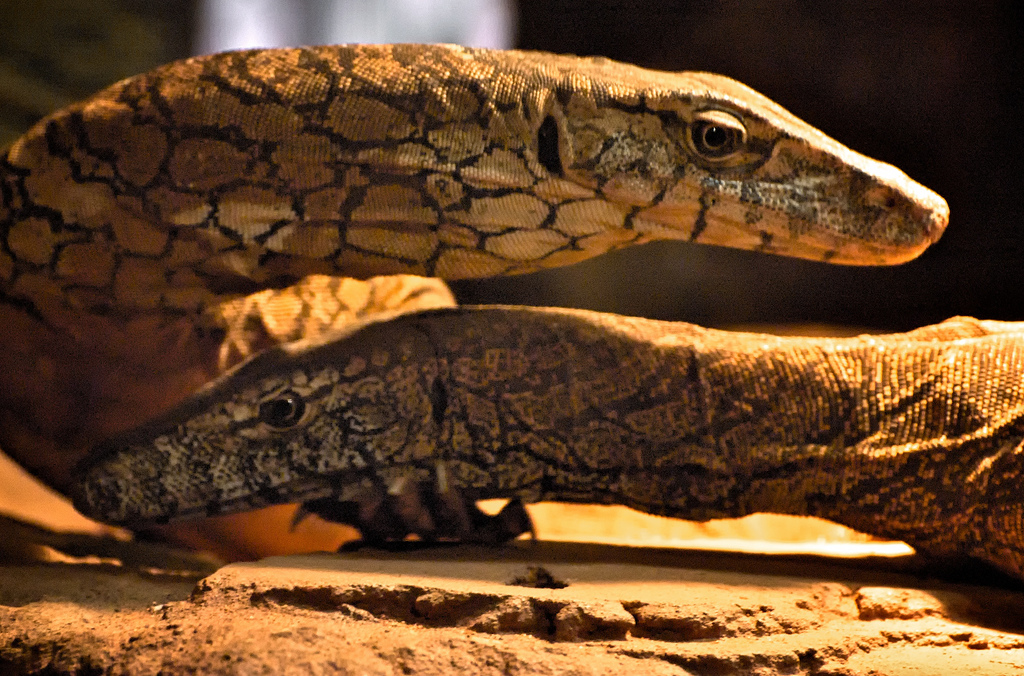
Perentie (V. giganteus)

Subgenus Soterosaurus:

- V. bangonorum, Bangon monitor
- V. cumingi, Cuming's water monitor, yellow-headed water monitor
- V. dalubhasa, Enteng's monitor
- V. marmoratus, marbled water monitor, Philippine water monitor
- V. nuchalis large-scaled water monitor
- V. palawanensis, Palawan water monitor
- V. rasmusseni Rasmussen's water monitor
- V. rudicollis, black roughneck monitor
- V. salvator, Asian water monitor
  - V. s. salvator, Sri Lankan water monitor
  - V. s. andamanensis, Andaman water monitor
  - V. s. bivittatus, two-striped water monitor, Javan water monitor
  - V. s. macromaculatus, Southeast Asian water monitor
  - V. s. ziegleri, Ziegler's water monitor
- V. samarensis, Samar water monitor
- V. togianus, Togian water monitor

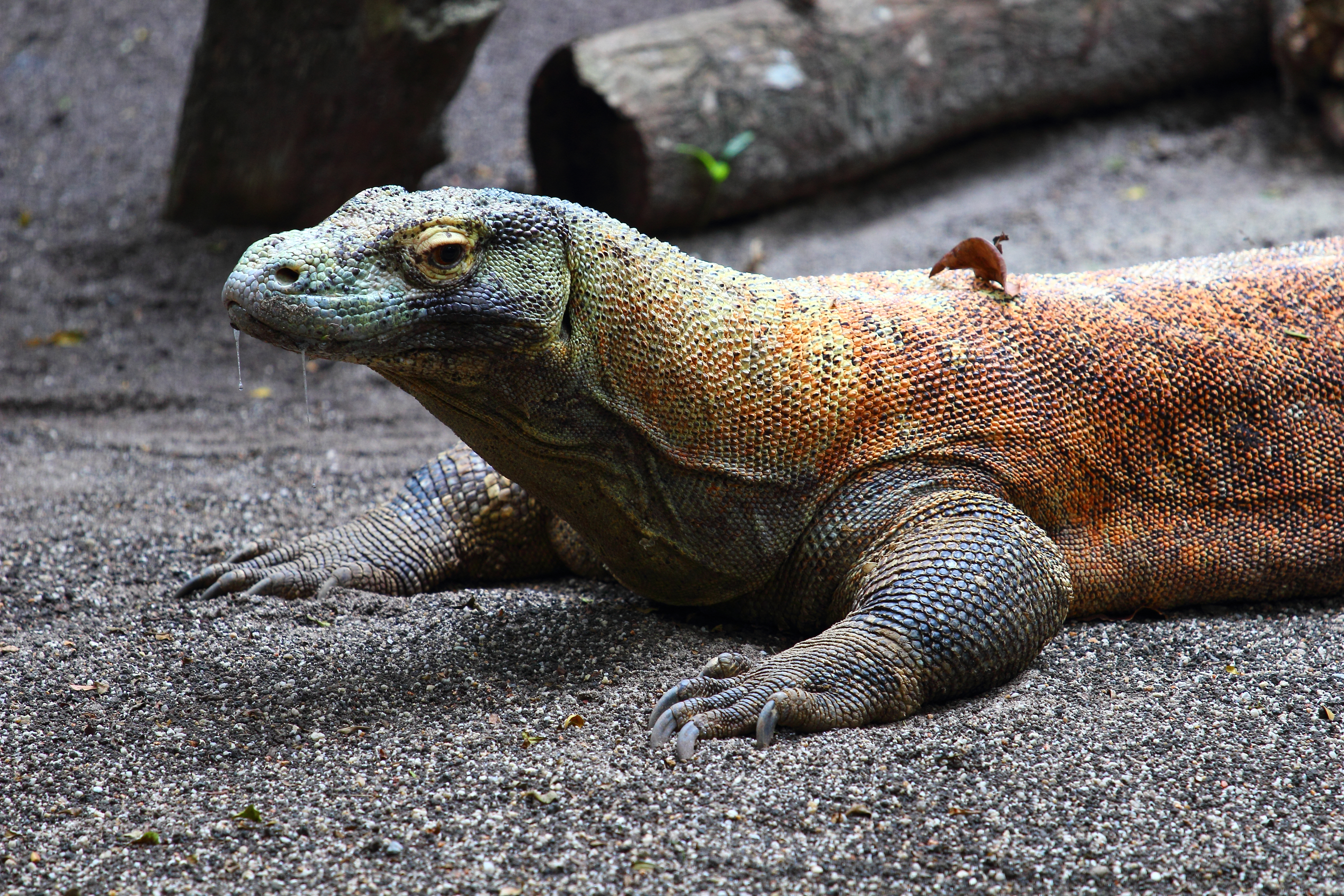
Komodo dragon (V. komodoensis)

Subgenus Varanus:

- V. giganteus, perentie
- V. gouldii, Gould's monitor, sand monitor, sand goanna
- V. komodoensis, Komodo dragon
- V. mertensi, Mertens' monitor
- V. panoptes
  - V. p. panoptes, Argus monitor
  - V. p. horni, Horn's monitor
  - V. p. rubidus, yellow-spotted monitor
- †V. priscus, megalania
- V. rosenbergi, Rosenberg's monitor, heath monitor
- V. spenceri, Spencer's monitor
- V. varius, lace monitor
