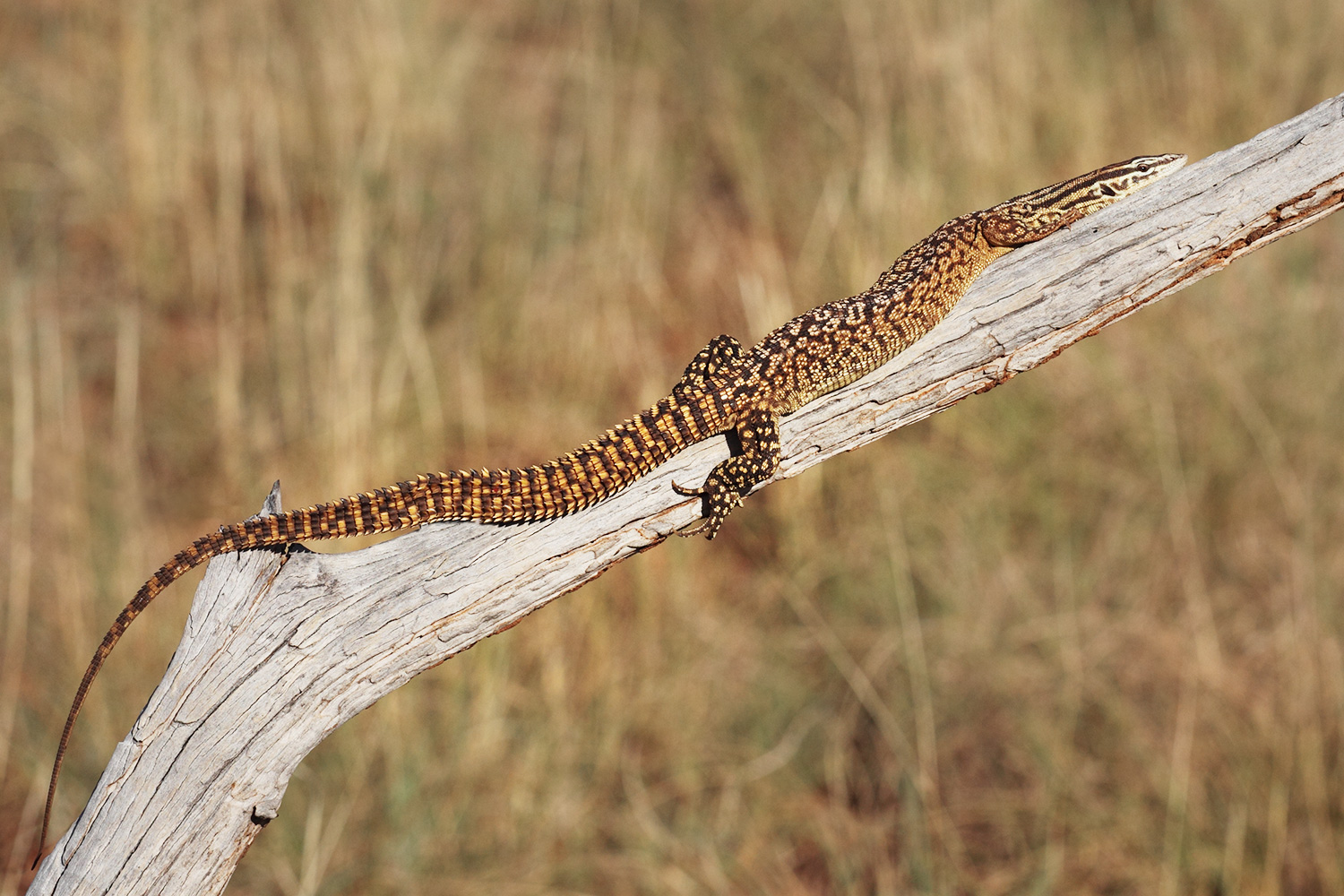
- In the wild, Northern Territory

Conservation status
- Least Concern (IUCN 3.1)

Scientific classification
- Kingdom: Animalia
- Phylum: Chordata
- Class: Reptilia
- Order: Squamata
- Suborder: Anguimorpha
- Family: Varanidae
- Genus: Varanus
- Subgenus: Odatria
- Species: V. acanthurus

Binomial name
- Varanus acanthurus Boulenger, 1885

Subspecies
- V. a. acanthurus; V. a. brachyurus; V. a. insulanicus
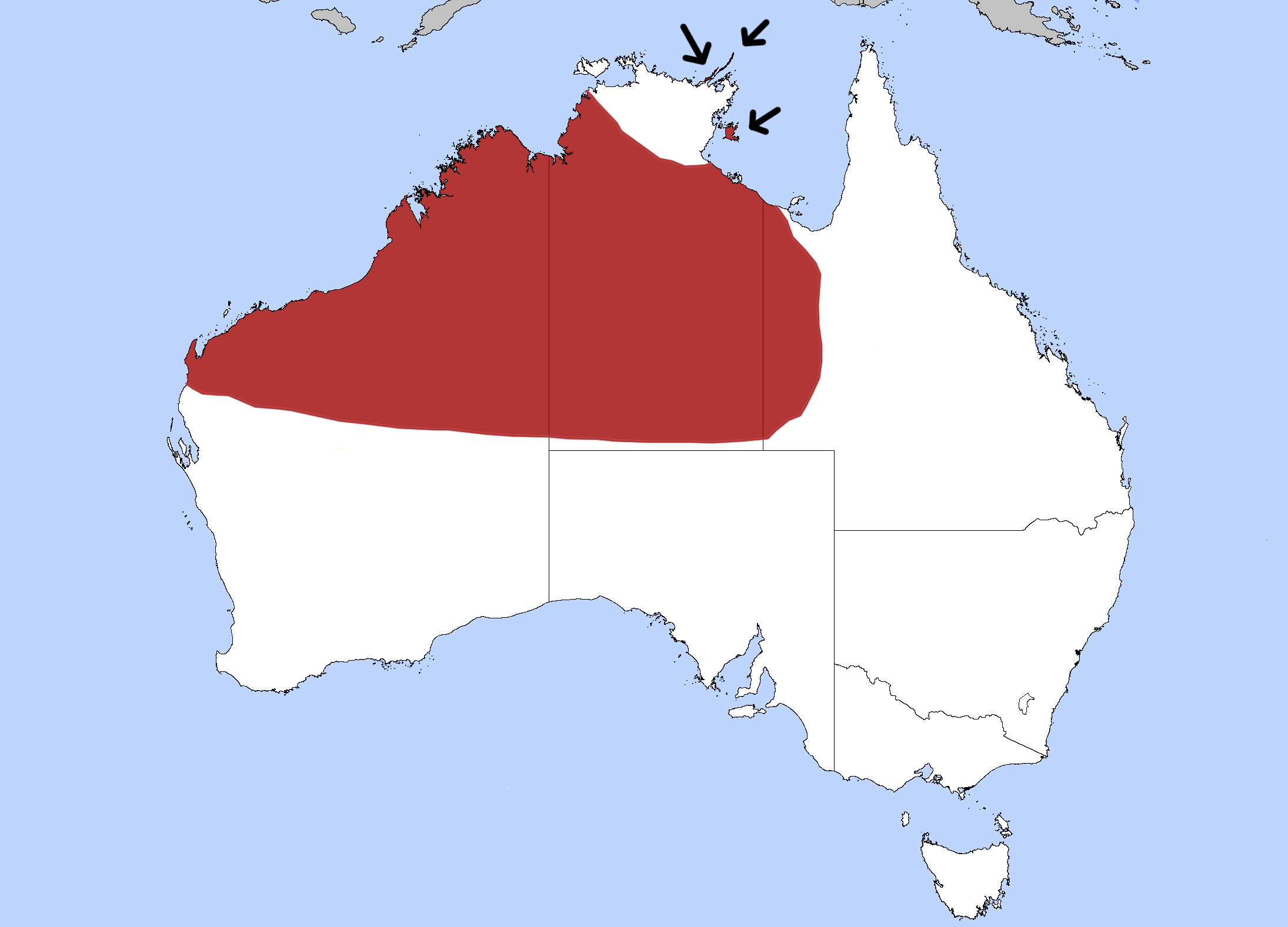
- Distribution of the spiny-tailed monitor

= Spiny-tailed monitor =

Species of lizard

The spiny-tailed monitor (Varanus acanthurus), also known as the Australian spiny-tailed monitor, the ridge-tailed monitor the Ackie dwarf monitor, and colloquially simply ackie monitor, is an Australian species of lizard belonging to the genus of monitor lizards (Varanus).

== Description ==
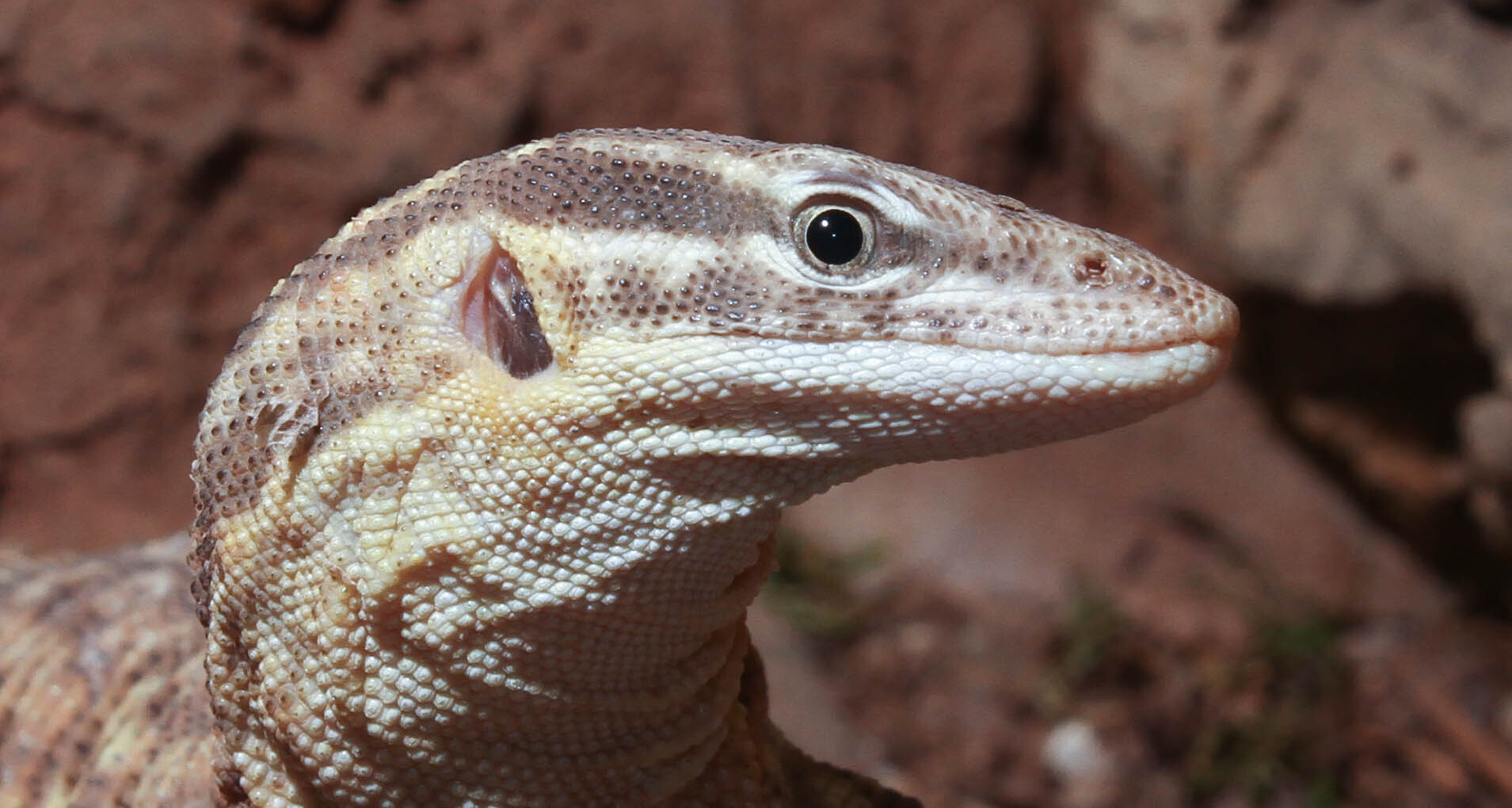
Head view

The spiny-tailed monitor, a somewhat small monitor lizard, can attain a total length of up to 70 cm (27 in), although there are unconfirmed reports of wild individuals growing up to 34 inches. The tail is about 1.3-2.3 times as long as the head and body combined. The upper side is a rich, dark brown and painted with bright-yellowish to cream spots, which often enclose a few dark scales. Its tail is round in section and features very spinose scales. There are 70-115 scales around the middle of the body.

The spiny-tailed monitor is distinguished from the similar-looking species V. baritji and V. primordius by the presence of pale longitudinal stripes on the neck.

== Distribution and habitat ==
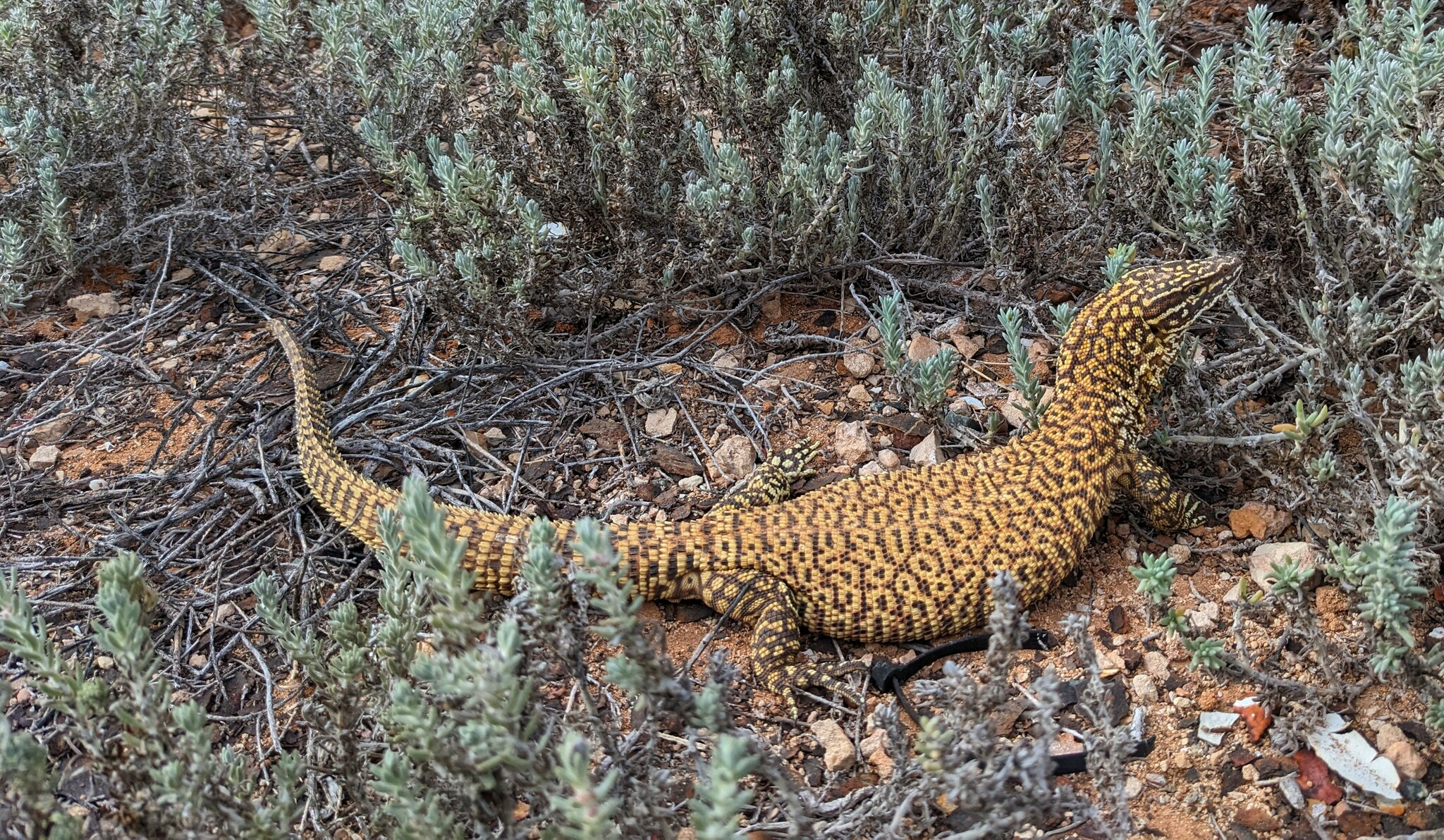
In the wild, Western Australia

This arid-adapted lizard is found in northern Western Australia, in the Northern Territory and in the western and north-western parts of Queensland. The spiny-tailed monitor is associated with arid rocky ranges and outcrops. V. a. acanthurus is native to northern Australia, from Broome on the west coast, through the Kimberley and the Top End, to the Gulf of Carpentaria. V. a. brachyurus can be found in the center, western, and eastern parts of the ackie's total range, as far west as Carnarvon and as far east as Mt. Isa. V. a. insulanicus' range is limited to Groote Eylandt and the Wessel Islands.

== Subspecies and taxonomy ==
The spiny-tailed monitor is part of an Indonesian and Australian radiation of dwarf monitor lizards, the subgenus Odatria.

Three subspecies of V. acanthurus are recognized:

- V. a. acanthurus of northwestern and northern Australia
- V. a. brachyurus of western and central Australia, Queensland
- V. a. insulanicus of Groote Eylandt and the islands of the Wessel group

Varanus primordius was at one point considered a subspecies (V. a. primordius), but has since been elevated to full species status.

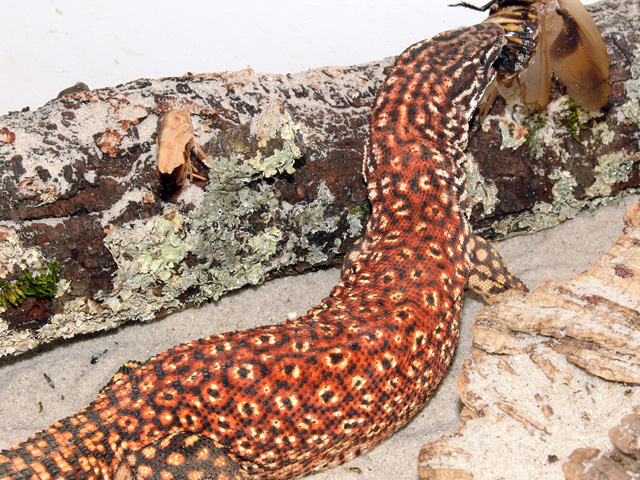
"Red ackie" (V. a. acanthurus)

In the pet trade, two "variants" of spiny-tailed monitors are commonly available. The "red ackie" monitor is likely the subspecies V. a. acanthurus, while the "yellow ackie" is likely V. a. brachyurus. The red ackie is generally larger and less commonly available than the yellow ackie.

The taxonomic status of the three subspecies is uncertain. In 2006, the results of a study on the mtDNA of Australian monitors were published, according to which the two continental subspecies do not form natural (monophyletic) taxonomic entities. V. a. insulanicus was found to be monophyletic, but it is more closely related to V. baritji than to other V. acanthurus. Therefore, V. a. insulanicus might represent a distinct species. Wilson and Swan (2010) still accept V. a. insulanicus as a valid subspecies of V. acanthurus, which is easily distinguished from other spiny-tailed monitors by its dark colouration and more banded pattern.

== Ecology ==
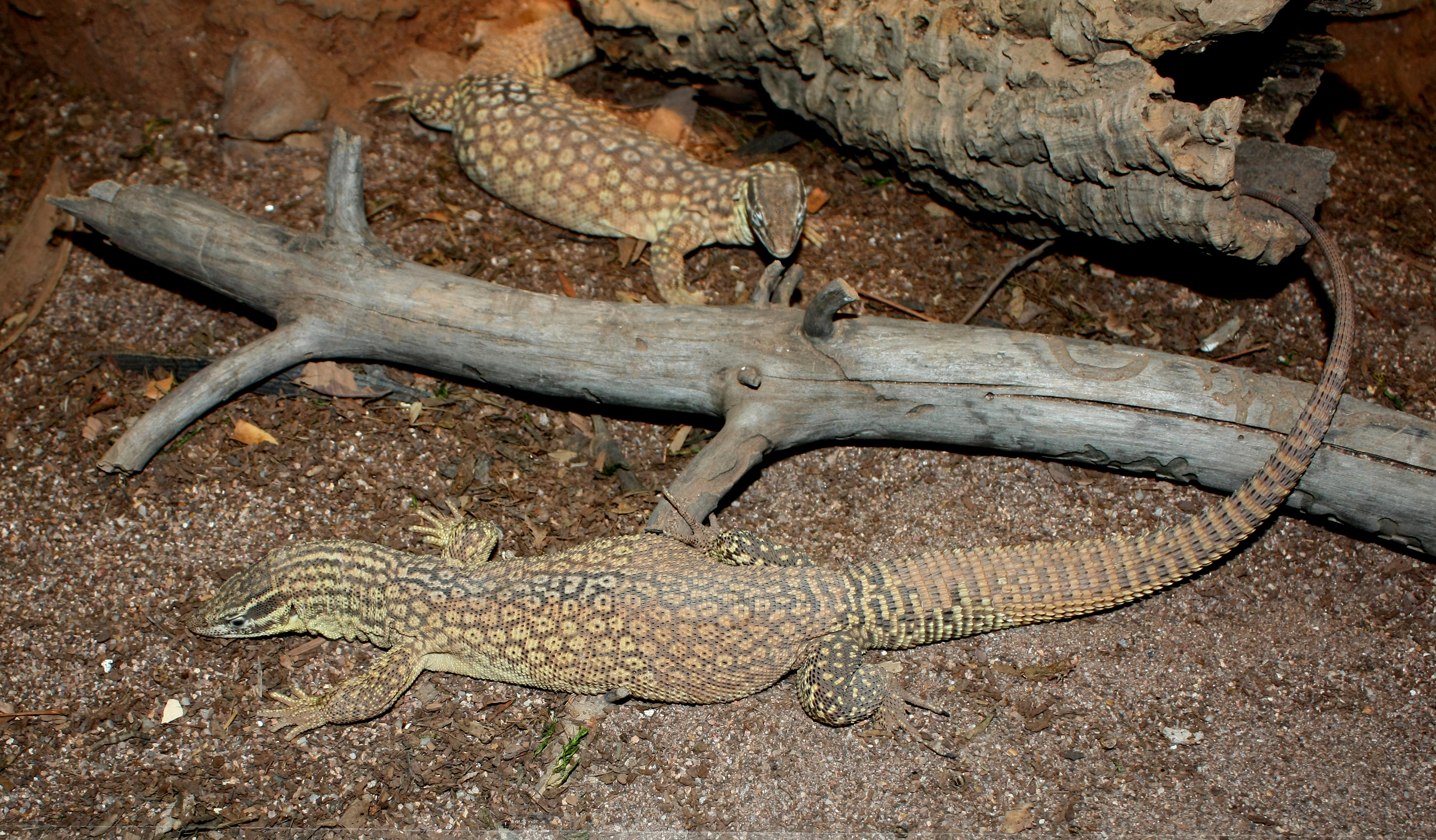
Two spiny-tailed monitors at the Cincinnati Zoo

Spiny-tailed monitors are diurnal, typically solitary ground-dwellers. This species is most often found in its shelter, mainly under rock slabs, wedged among boulders or in rock crevices, and in burrows. Only rarely do they hide in spinifex. Sheltering underground gives them access to humid microclimates which helps keep them hydrated enough to survive the otherwise arid nature of their habitat. Their diet is consistent with the diet of intensive foragers, implying that they likely spend quite a bit of their time hunting.

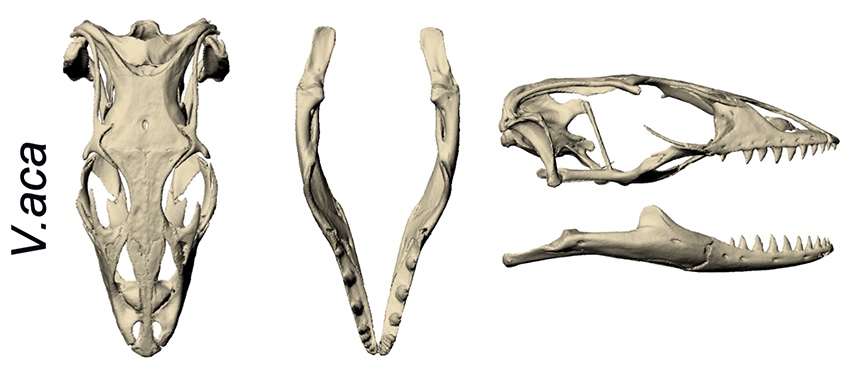
Skull

=== Diet ===
They prey mainly on arthropods, such as grasshoppers, beetles, cockroaches, spiders, isopods, caterpillars, cicadas, snails, stick insects, centipedes, crickets, and ticks. Small lizards such as skinks, geckos, dragon lizards, or possibly smaller monitor lizards are also eaten, making up about a third of its diet, as well as marsupial joeys. Approximately 70% of its water requirement comes from food.

In captivity, they are sometimes fed cat and dog food as well as processed canned food. This isn't recommended as this type of food doesn't contain the correct nutrients for this species. A varied diet rich with different vertebrate and invertebrate prey (such as Dubia roaches, crickets, mealworms, eggs, shrimp, and, on a monthly basis, rodents) is important to the health of captive spiny-tailed monitors, as they naturally have a wide range of prey in the wild.

== Reproduction ==
There are a number of methods of sexing ackie monitors, although the hemipenal transillumination technique is generally considered to be the easiest and most accurate. Sex can also be guessed using visual markers, but it is typically not nearly as accurate. Male ackie monitors are generally larger, have blockier heads, and have grippy scales on the underside of their tail. Females are generally smaller with narrower, pointier heads, and smooth scales under their tail.

In captivity, a clutch consists of up to 18 eggs. The young hatch after three to five months of incubation, and measure 15 cm (6 in). The knowledge on reproduction in the wild is sparse. Males most likely mature at 30 cm (12 in) snout-vent length, females mature at 25–36 cm (10–14 in) snout-vent length. Ovulation occurs in August and November. The eggs are deposited in self-dug tunnels. In the wild, females have been shown to share massive burrows, nesting communally.
