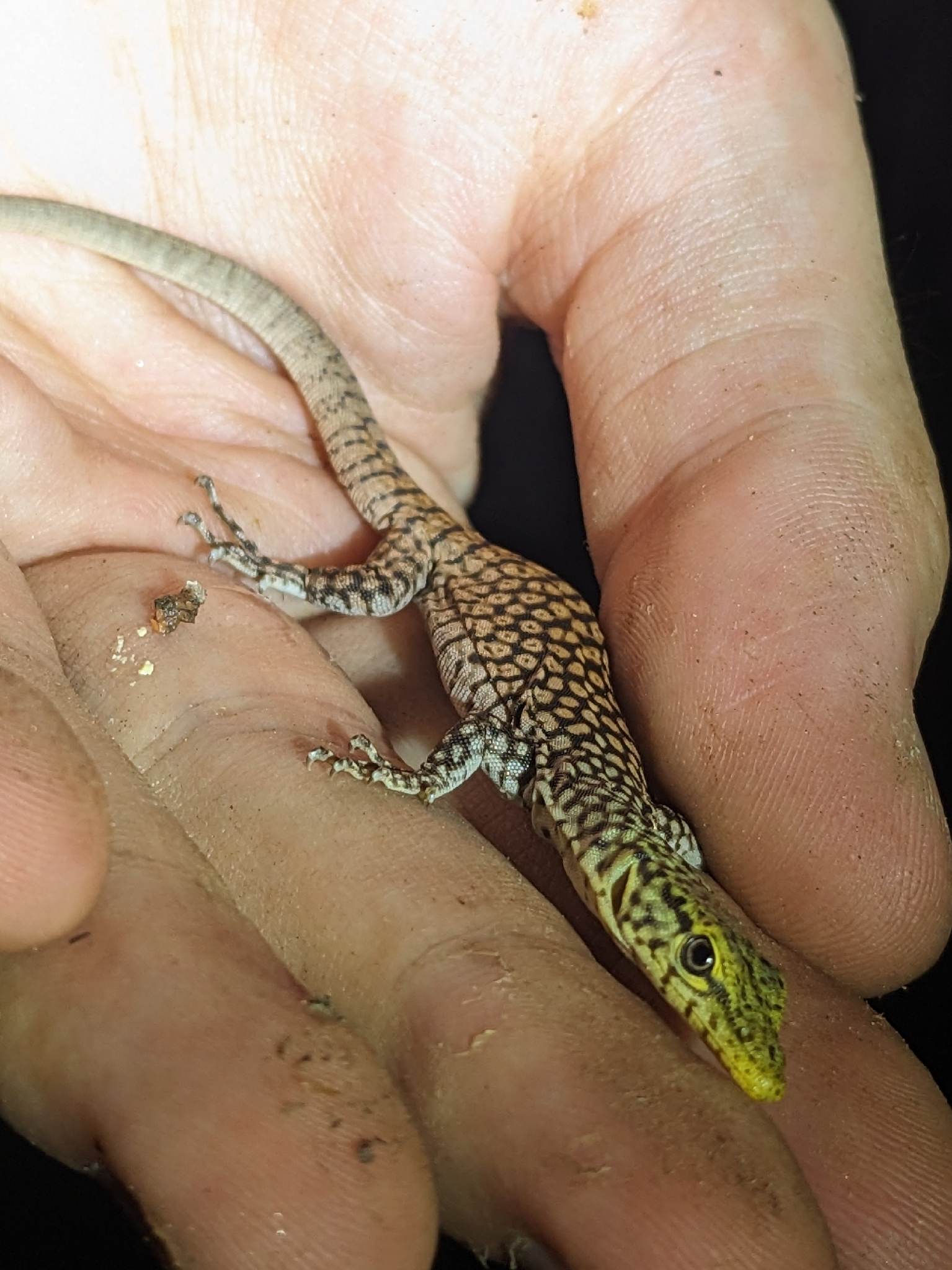

Scientific classification
- Kingdom: Animalia
- Phylum: Chordata
- Class: Reptilia
- Order: Squamata
- Suborder: Anguimorpha
- Family: Varanidae
- Genus: Varanus
- Subgenus: Odatria
- Species: V. iridis

Binomial name
- Varanus iridis Zozaya, Read, Wright, Gale & Macor, 2026

= Varanus iridis =

Species of monitor lizard

Varanus iridis, commonly known as the rainbow rock monitor, is a species of dwarf monitor lizard endemic to Far North Queensland. It was formally described in 2026 along with its close relatives Varanus phosphoros and Varanus umbra. The three species form part of a clade which diverged from other Odatrian monitor lizards around 7 million years ago.

== Taxonomy ==
The rainbow rock monitor was described in February 2026, following a 2025 field survey conducted by the Australian National University in northeastern Queensland, Australia. It was initially believed to be of the same species as the yellow-headed and orange-headed rock monitor, but genetic testing identified the three to be distinct. They form a previously unrecognized clade, designated the "Varanus iridis species-group", within the subgenus Odatria, having diverged approximately 7 million years ago.

The specific name 'iridis' is the genitive form of the Latin 'iris', meaning rainbow, in reference to its colour transitions.

== Description ==
Rainbow monitor lizards are fairly small and slim compared to others in their genus. The holotype, a male, had a snout-vent length (SVL) of 143.7 millimetres (5.66 in). It is tan-brown in colour and is covered in pale rings, with a pale, patternless tail and underside. The lizard can be distinguished by the remarkable colour transitions across its back, spanning from yellow on the head, tones of blue on the nape and red on the body.

Like other Odatrian monitors it is small, active, and secretive. It was previously unknown to science before being described, living in an underpopulated area that is difficult to access by road and unsuitable for cattle grazing.

== Distribution and habitat ==
The rainbow rock monitor is known from a small area near the town of Mount Surprise, within the Kidston subregion of the Einasleigh Uplands bioregion. The holotype was collected in 2024 from the type locality of Springfield. Its habitat is dominated by granite boulders and eucalyptus trees, and the lizard has not been spotted in the open, pointing to a more secretive lifestyle. The lizard's exact distribution and population is unknown.
