= Varanus umbra =

Scientific classification
- Kingdom: Animalia
- Phylum: Chordata
- Class: Reptilia
- Order: Squamata
- Suborder: Anguimorpha
- Family: Varanidae
- Genus: Varanus
- Subgenus: Odatria
- Species: V. umbra

Binomial name
- Varanus umbra Read, Wright, Gale, Macor & Zozaya, 2026

Species of monitor lizard

Varanus umbra, known commonly as the orange-headed rock monitor, is a species of dwarf monitor lizard endemic to the savannas of Far North Queensland. It was formally described in 2026 along with its close relatives Varanus iridis and Varanus phosphoros. The three species form part of a clade which diverged from other Odatrian monitor lizards around 7 million years ago.

== Taxonomy ==
The orange-headed rock monitor was described in February 2026, following a 2025 field survey conducted by the Australian National University in northeastern Queensland, Australia. It was initially believed to be of the same species as the yellow-headed rock monitor and rainbow rock monitor, but genetic testing identified the three to be distinct. They form a previously unrecognized clade, designated the "Varanus iridis species-group", within the subgenus Odatria, having diverged approximately 7 million years ago.

The specific name, 'umbra', is derived from a Latin word meaning shade or shadow in reference to its distinctive colouration meant to resemble the horizon at dusk or evoke the appearance of being cast in shadow.

== Description ==
Orange-headed monitor lizards are fairly small and slim compared to other members of their genus. The holotype, a female, had a snout-vent length (SVL) of 136.8 millimetres (5.39 in).

The dark brown to black reticulum forms a distinct pattern of well-spaced pale grey to buff ocelli across the nape and upper abdomen, each enclosing an orange or ochre centre. The colour of the head and nape ranges from warm golden brown to burnt–orange, hence its common name. The reticulum becomes diffuse and irregular with the ocelli beginning to fade beyond the midbody. The limbs and tail are a uniform grey with obscure dark mottling, with the tail also featuring faint alternating bands of grey and dark grey–brown.

== Distribution and habitat ==
The orange-headed rock monitor is found in sandstone outcrops in open savanna woodlands. It is known from three sites situated in open savanna woodland on the Gregory Range's eastern edge, but believed to have a broader range. The holotype was collected in 2023 from the type locality of Northhead. The lizard's exact distribution and population is unknown. The species occupies a remote habitat and its shy, secretive habits make it hard to detect.
