= Varanus phosphoros =

Scientific classification
- Kingdom: Animalia
- Phylum: Chordata
- Class: Reptilia
- Order: Squamata
- Suborder: Anguimorpha
- Family: Varanidae
- Genus: Varanus
- Subgenus: Odatria
- Species: V. phosphoros

Binomial name
- Varanus phosphoros Zozaya, Macor, Gale, Wright, Pavón-Vázquez & Read, 2026

Species of monitor lizard

Varanus phosphoros, known commonly as the yellow-headed rock monitor, is a species of dwarf monitor lizard endemic to the savannas of Far North Queensland. It was formally described in 2026 along with its close relatives Varanus iridis and Varanus umbra. The three species form part of a clade which diverged from other Odatrian monitor lizards around 7 million years ago.

The species was well known to local herpetologists, who thought of it as a local adaptation of another species. This was refuted by genetic analysis, which demonstrated that the genetic difference between it and the other species of its clade was greater than with many other already recognised species of monitor lizard.

== Taxonomy ==
The yellow-headed rock monitor was described in February 2026, following a 2025 field survey conducted by the Australian National University in northeastern Queensland, Australia. It was initially believed to be of the same species as the orange-headed rock monitor and rainbow rock monitor, but genetic testing identified the three to be distinct. They form a previously unrecognized clade, designated the "Varanus iridis species-group", within the subgenus Odatria, having diverged approximately 7 million years ago.

The specific name comes from the Greek 'phōs', meaning light, and 'phérō', which means to bear or carry, in reference to its bright pattern of ocelli.

== Description ==
Yellow-headed monitor lizards are fairly small and slim compared to others in their genus. The holotype, a male, had a snout-vent length (SVL) of 168.4 millimetres (6.63 in). The lizard has a dark pattern along its back and legs, reticulated with numerous pale rings. Its head and nape are flushed with a yellow or yellow-green coloration, and its underside is pale and less patterned.

== Distribution and habitat ==
The yellow-headed rock monitor has been recorded in rocky habitats within the Einasleigh Uplands, Cape York Peninsula, and Wet Tropics bioregions. In the survey by Zozaya et al., it was most often recorded near Mount Molloy and Mount Carbine, and is frequently found alongside others of its species. The lizard's exact distribution and population is unknown.
