= Varanus colei =

Scientific classification
- Kingdom: Animalia
- Phylum: Chordata
- Class: Reptilia
- Order: Squamata
- Suborder: Anguimorpha
- Family: Varanidae
- Genus: Varanus
- Species: V. colei

Binomial name
- Varanus colei Welton, Travers, Siler, & Brown, 2019

Species of lizard

Varanus colei is a species of lizard of the Varanidae family. It is found on the Kai Islands in Indonesia.
