= Fibrinogenolysis =

- Specialty: Hematology

Primary fibrinogenolysis is a medical condition that appears with abnormal production of fibrinogen/fibrin degradation products (FDP), degradation of coagulation factors V, VIII, IX, XI and/or degradation of the fibrin present in any pre-existing localized thrombi and hemostatic clots.
