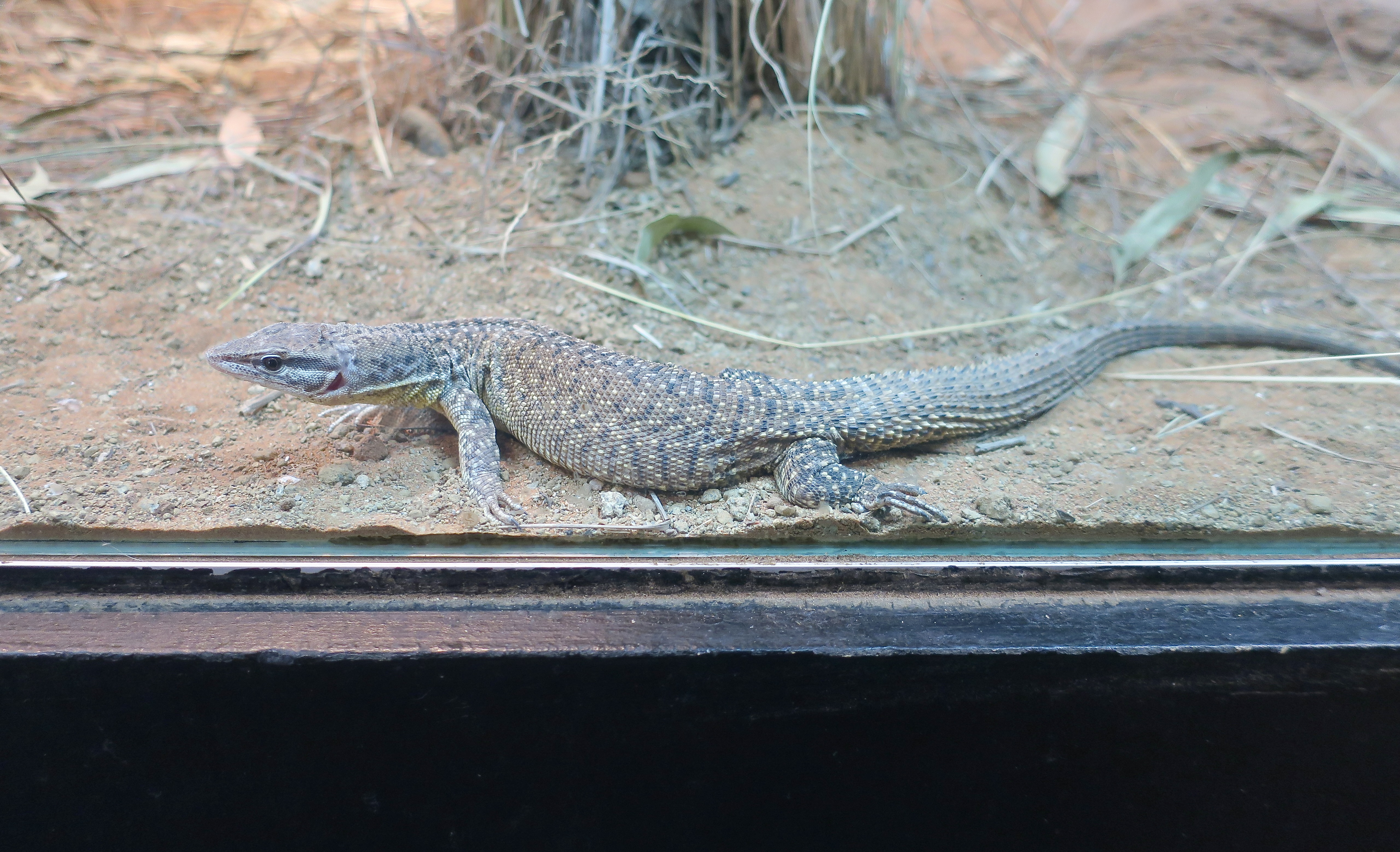

Scientific classification
- Kingdom: Animalia
- Phylum: Chordata
- Class: Reptilia
- Order: Squamata
- Suborder: Anguimorpha
- Family: Varanidae
- Genus: Varanus
- Subgenus: Odatria
- Species: V. insulanicus

Binomial name
- Varanus insulanicus Mertens, 1958

= Varanus insulanicus =

Species of lizard

The Groote Eylandt monitor (Varanus insulanicus), also known commonly as the Black-Spotted Ridge-Tailed Goanna, is a medium-sized species of monitor lizard in the family Varanidae. The species is endemic to the Northern Territory. It belongs to the subgenus Odatria.
