= Primary fibrinogenolysis =

Pathological lysis of fibrinogen

Primary fibrinogenolysis is the pathological lysis of fibrinogen characterized with a low fibrinogen, high fibrin degradation products, prolonged prothrombin time and activated partial thromboplastin time, a normal platelet count and absence of microcirculatory thrombosis.

== Diagnosis ==
The most important differential diagnosis is disseminated intravascular coagulation, which is characterized with similar features but presence of a low platelet count and microcirculatory thrombosis. Antifibrinolytic treatments are contraindicated in patients with disseminated intravascular coagulation while they are useful in the treatment of primary fibrinogenolysis.
