= Northern blunt-spined monitor =

Northern ridge-tailed monitor

Conservation status
- Near Threatened (IUCN 3.1)

Scientific classification
- Kingdom: Animalia
- Phylum: Chordata
- Class: Reptilia
- Order: Squamata
- Suborder: Anguimorpha
- Family: Varanidae
- Genus: Varanus
- Subgenus: Odatria
- Species: V. primordius

Binomial name
- Varanus primordius Mertens, 1942

Species of lizard

The northern blunt-spined monitor (Varanus primordius) is a species of lizard in the family Varanidae. The species is native to Australia's tropical Northern Territory. It is listed as Near Threatened on the IUCN Red List.
