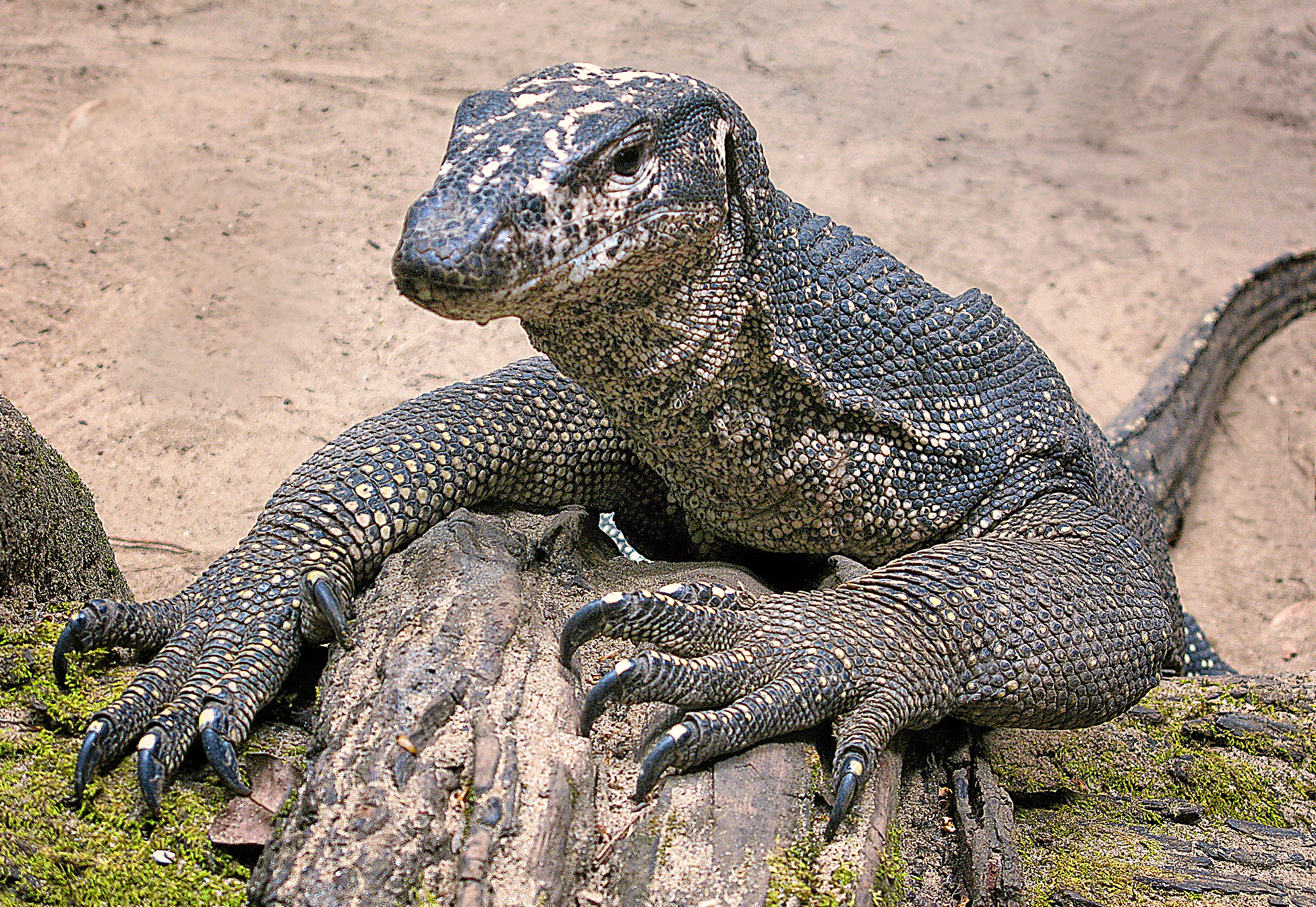

Scientific classification
- Kingdom: Animalia
- Phylum: Chordata
- Class: Reptilia
- Order: Squamata
- Suborder: Anguimorpha
- Family: Varanidae
- Genus: Varanus
- Subgenus: Soterosaurus
- Species: V. palawanensis

Binomial name
- Varanus palawanensis Koch, Gaulke & Böhme, 2010
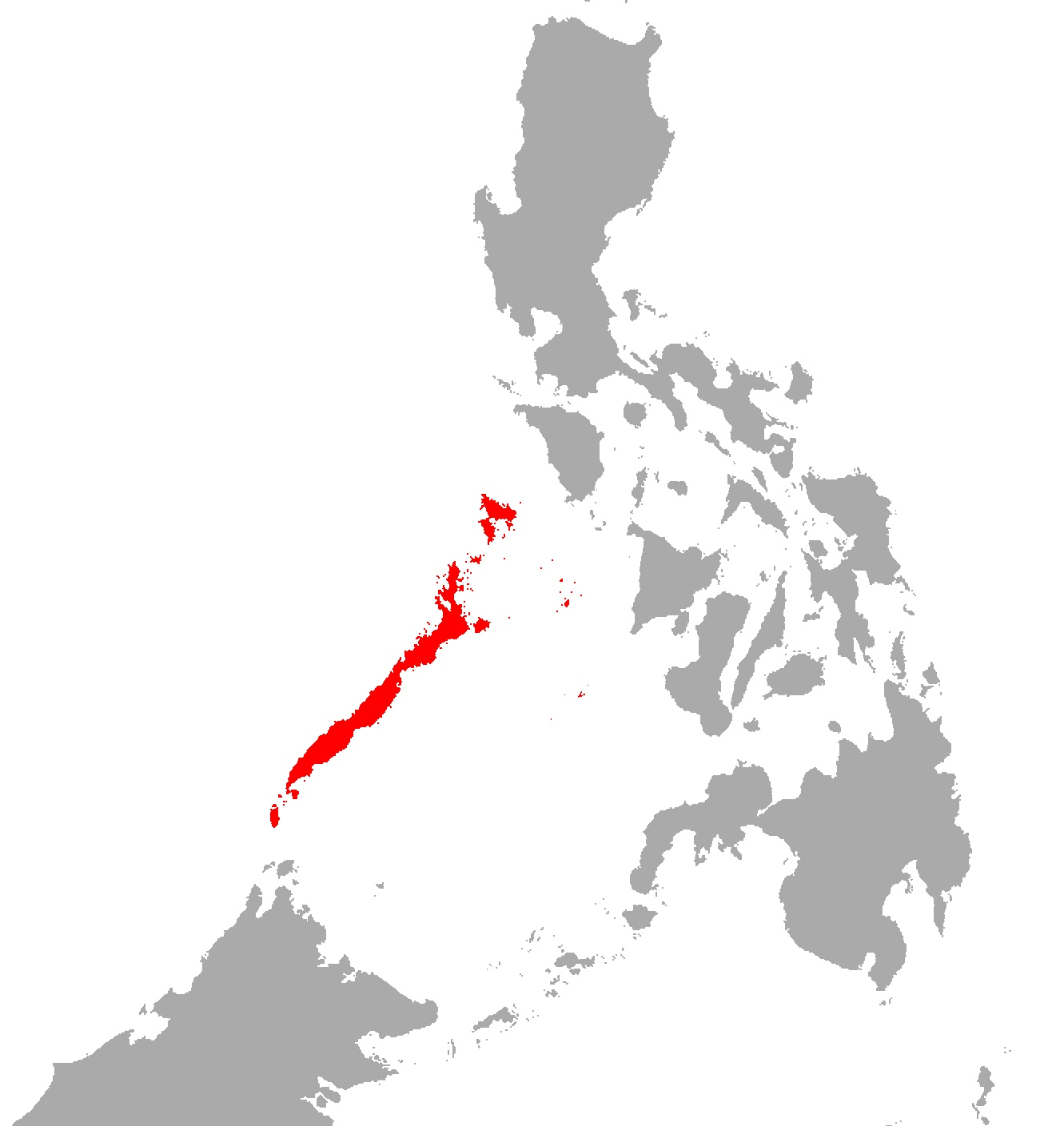

= Palawan water monitor =

Species of lizard

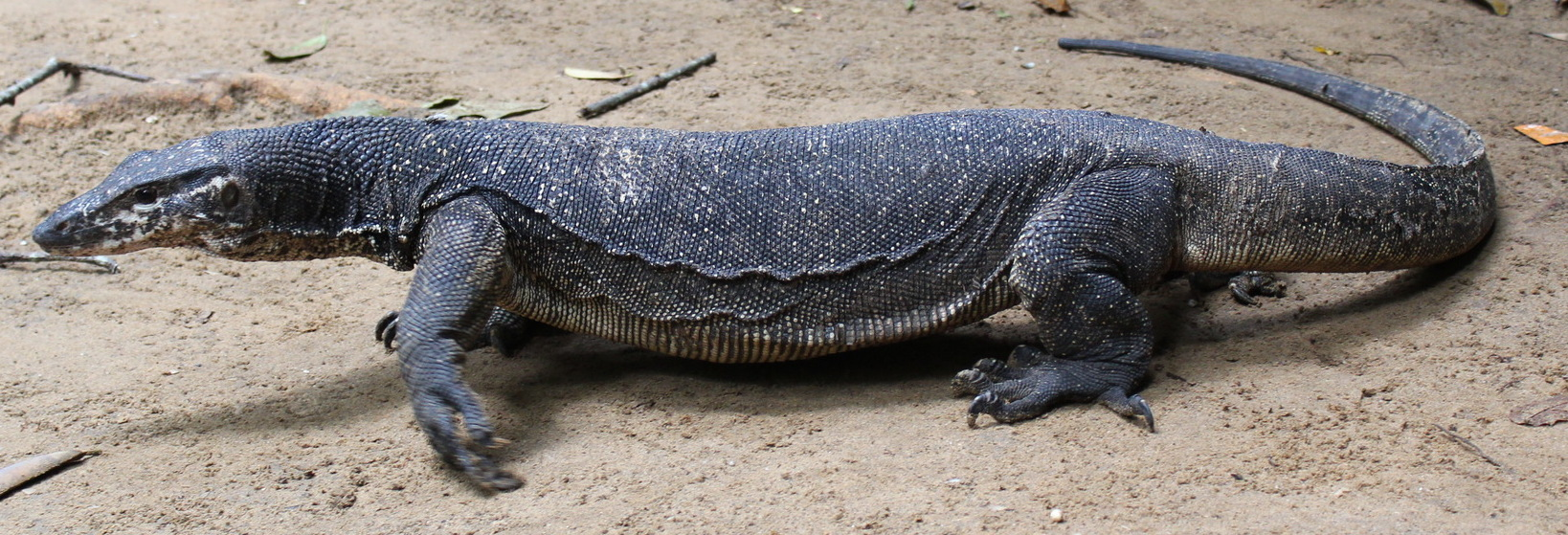
El Nido, Palawan, Philippines

The Palawan water monitor (Varanus palawanensis) is a quite large species of monitor lizard in the family Varanidae. The species is endemic to the Philippines.

== Description ==
Varanus palawanensis can reach total length of (including tail) 2 metres (6,6 ft).

The best studied water monitor population of the Philippines is that of Calauit ( Gaulke 1989 ), a small islet belonging to the Calamian Island Group at the north-easterly margin of Palawan Province. Gaulke ( 1989 ) provided morphological data for 167 specimens . The longest specimen had a total length of 1880 mm with parts of its tail missing. The smallest specimen measured only 390 mm from the tip of the tail to the tip of the snout. Latter specimen had a snout-vent length of 14 cm, while the largest measured 78.8 cm . The mean snout-vent length was 54.77 cm.

== Taxonomy ==
Varanus palawanensis has enough differences to be considered a distinct species from the closely related V. salvator (water monitor), V. marmoratus (marbled water monitor), and V. rasmusseni. V. palawanensis belongs to the subgenus Soterosaurus with these three species and several other species.

== Distribution ==
Varanus palawanensis is found in the Greater Palawan region, i.e. Palawan, Balabac, and the Calamian Islands (at least Calauit and Busuanga), as well as on Sibutu in the Sulu Archipelago, and may be present on other Sulu islands or Borneo.
