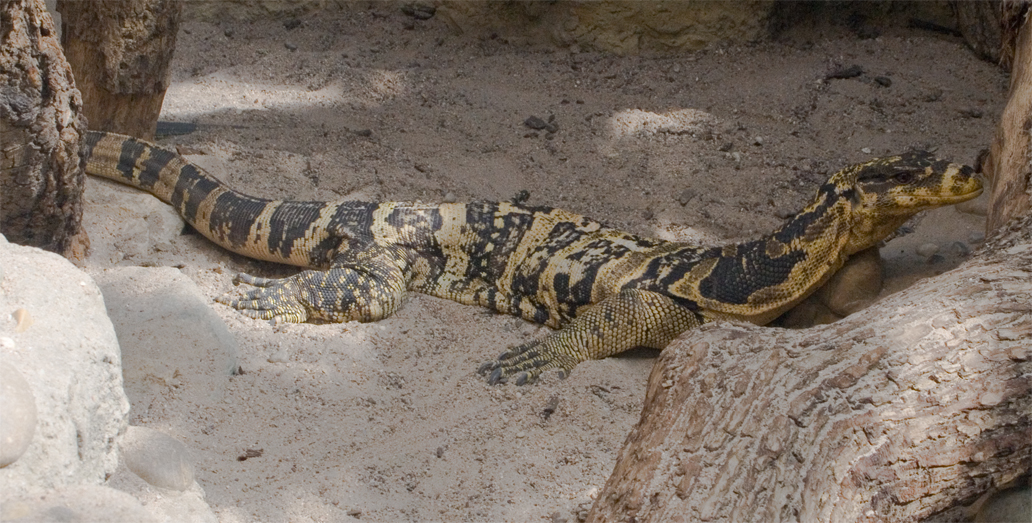

Conservation status
- Least Concern (IUCN 3.1)

Scientific classification
- Kingdom: Animalia
- Phylum: Chordata
- Class: Reptilia
- Order: Squamata
- Suborder: Anguimorpha
- Family: Varanidae
- Genus: Varanus
- Subgenus: Soterosaurus
- Species: V. cumingi

Binomial name
- Varanus cumingi Martin, 1839
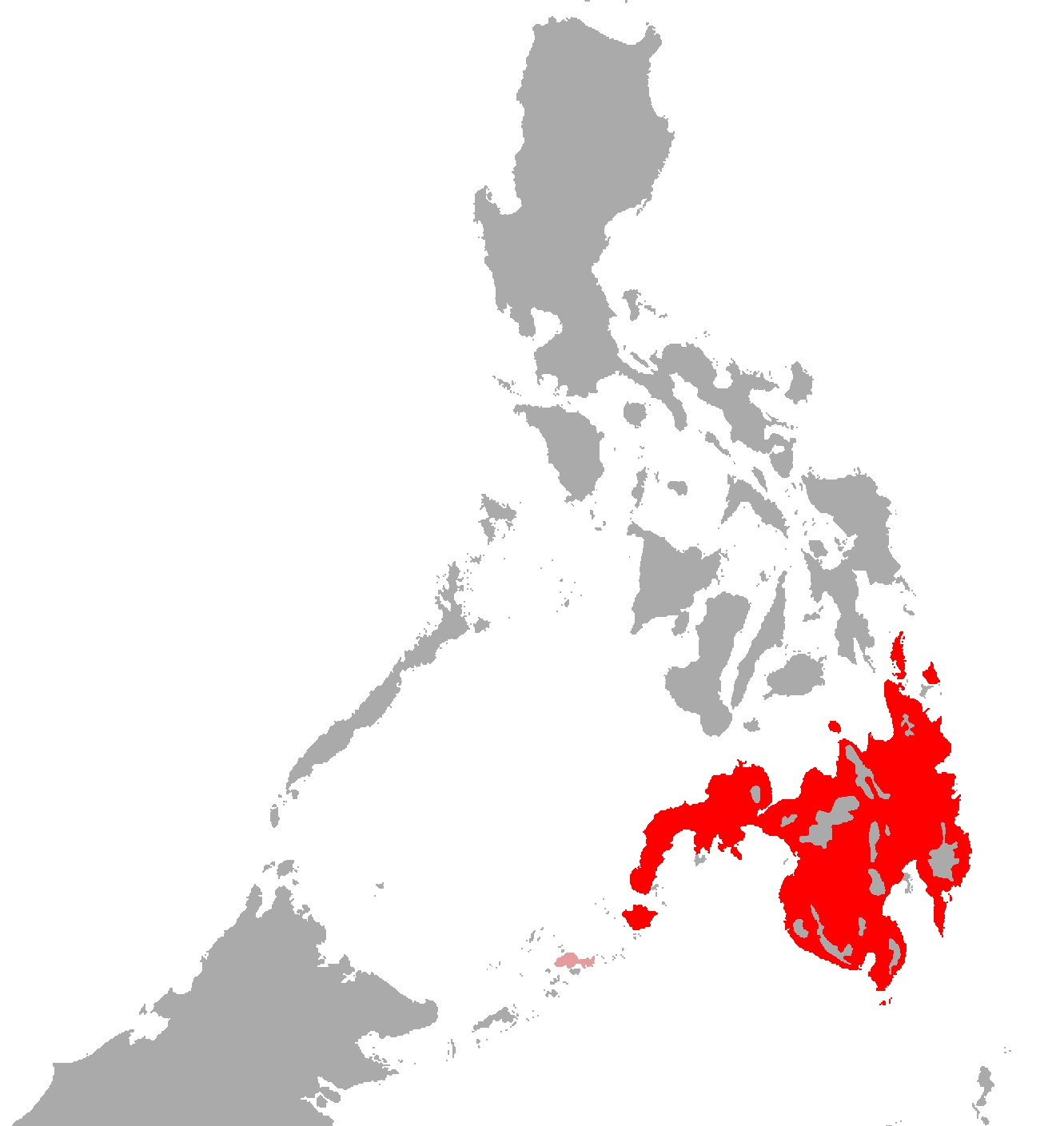

Synonyms
- Varanus cumingi Martin, 1839; Varanus salvator cumingi — Mertens, 1942; Varanus cumingi — Koch et al., 2007; Varanus (Soterosaurus) cumingi — Koch et al., 2010

= Yellow-headed water monitor =

Species of lizard

Juvenile

The yellow-headed water monitor (Varanus cumingi), also commonly known as Cuming's water monitor, the Mindanao water monitor, and the Philippine water monitor, is a large species of monitor lizard in the family Varanidae. The species is endemic to the Philippines. It thrives in mangrove, forest and water margins in tropical refuges, where it feeds on birds, fishes, mammals, and carrion.

== Taxonomy ==
V. cumingi was previously recognized as a subspecies of the water monitor (Varanus salvator), but since 2007 is acknowledged as a species in its own right.

== Etymology ==
The specific name, cumingi, is in honor of English conchologist and botanist Hugh Cuming.

== Geographic range ==
V. cumingi is found in the southern Philippines, where it is distributed on Mindanao and a few small nearby islands.

== Description ==
V. cumingi has the highest degree of yellow coloration among all the endemic water monitors in the Philippines. The V. cumingi is a large lizard and medium-sized monitor lizard. The largest specimens its species can reaching a length of 1.5 m (4 ft 11 in) with a snout-vent length of 60 cm (24 in) and 2.5 kg (5.5 lb) in a mass.

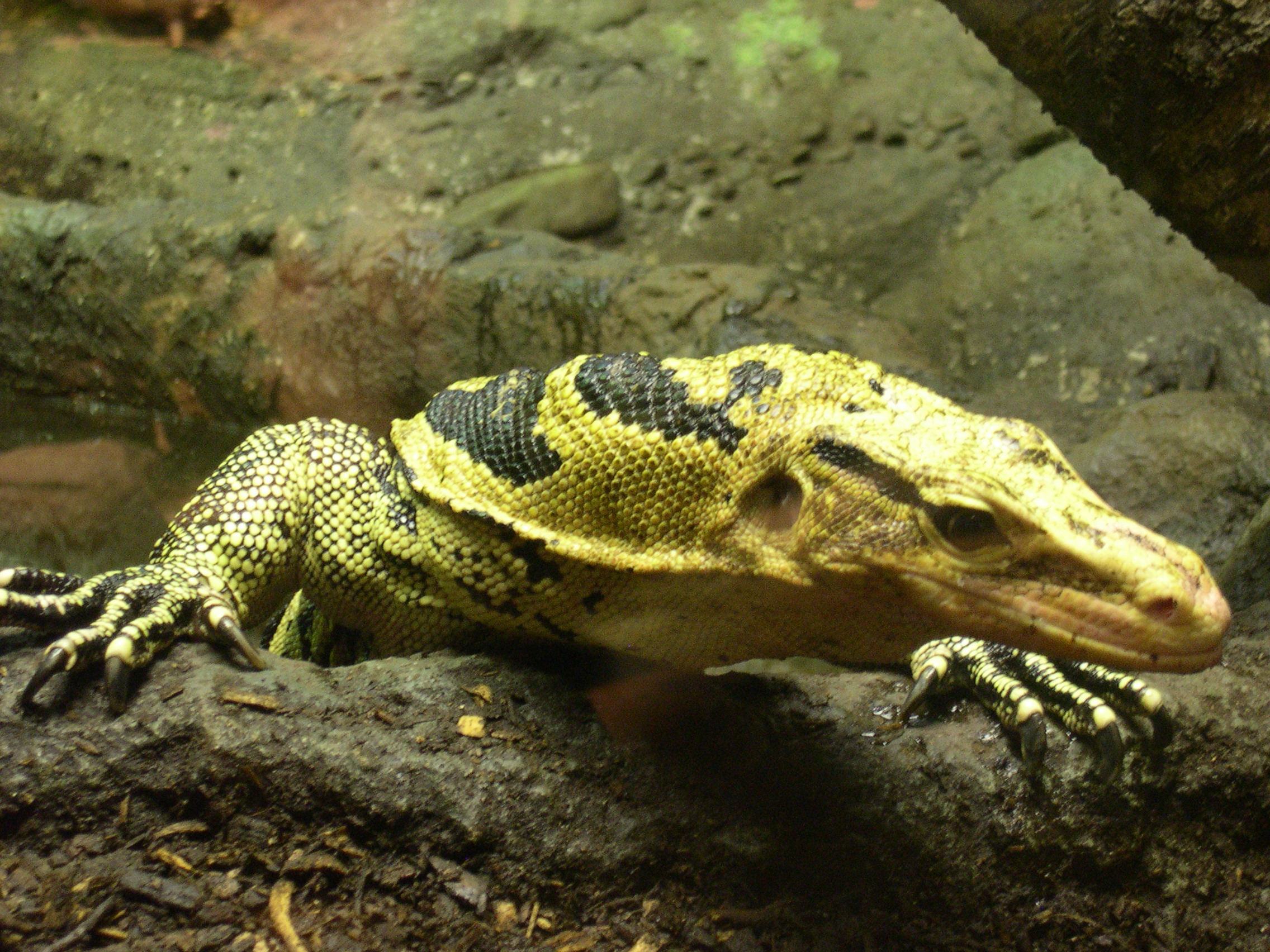
Showing yellow head

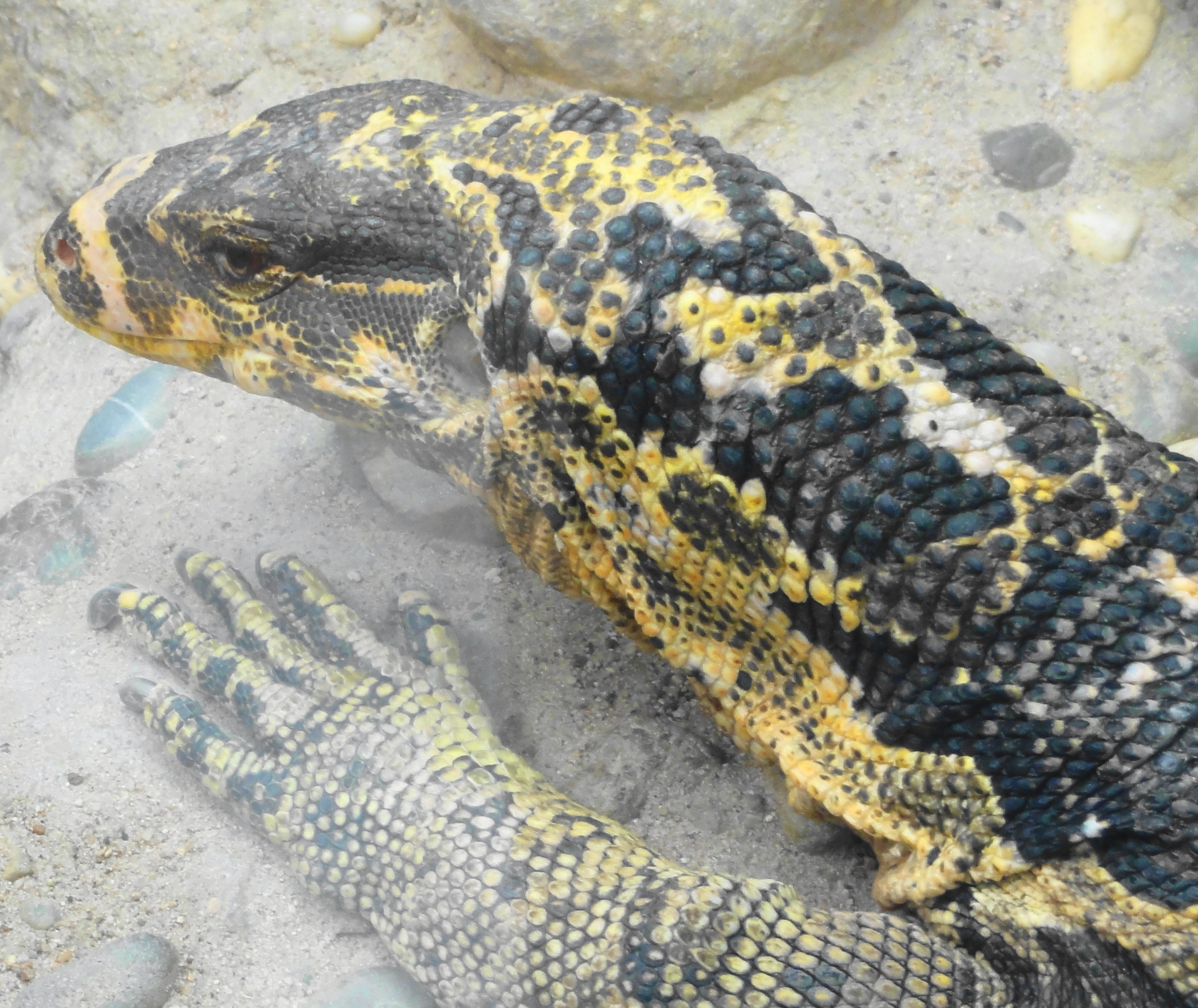
Darker individual in Frankfurt Zoo

== Habitat ==
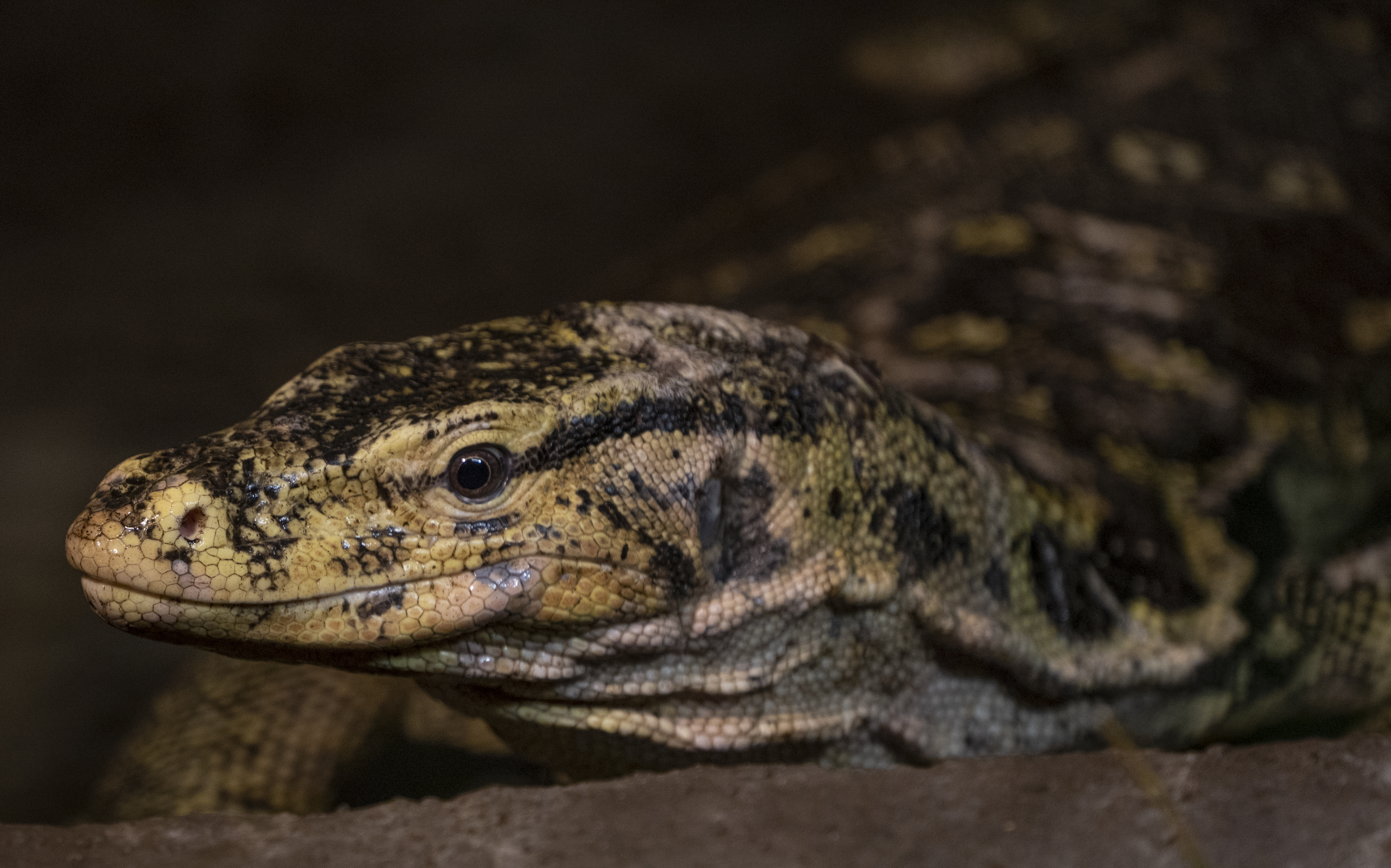
V. cumingi

The preferred natural habitats of V. cumingi are mangroves and moist forest, but it is also abundant in artificial habitats such as fish ponds and cultivated lands.

== Diet ==
The diet of V. cumingi is composed of rodents, birds, fishes, crustaceans, mollusks, and other invertebrates, including eggs and carrion.

== Subspecies ==
Two subspecies were formerly recognized: V. c. cumingi occurring on Mindanao and offshore islands and V. c. samarensis on the islands of Bohol, Leyte and Samar. However, the latter has since been elevated to full species status as Varanus samarensis.
