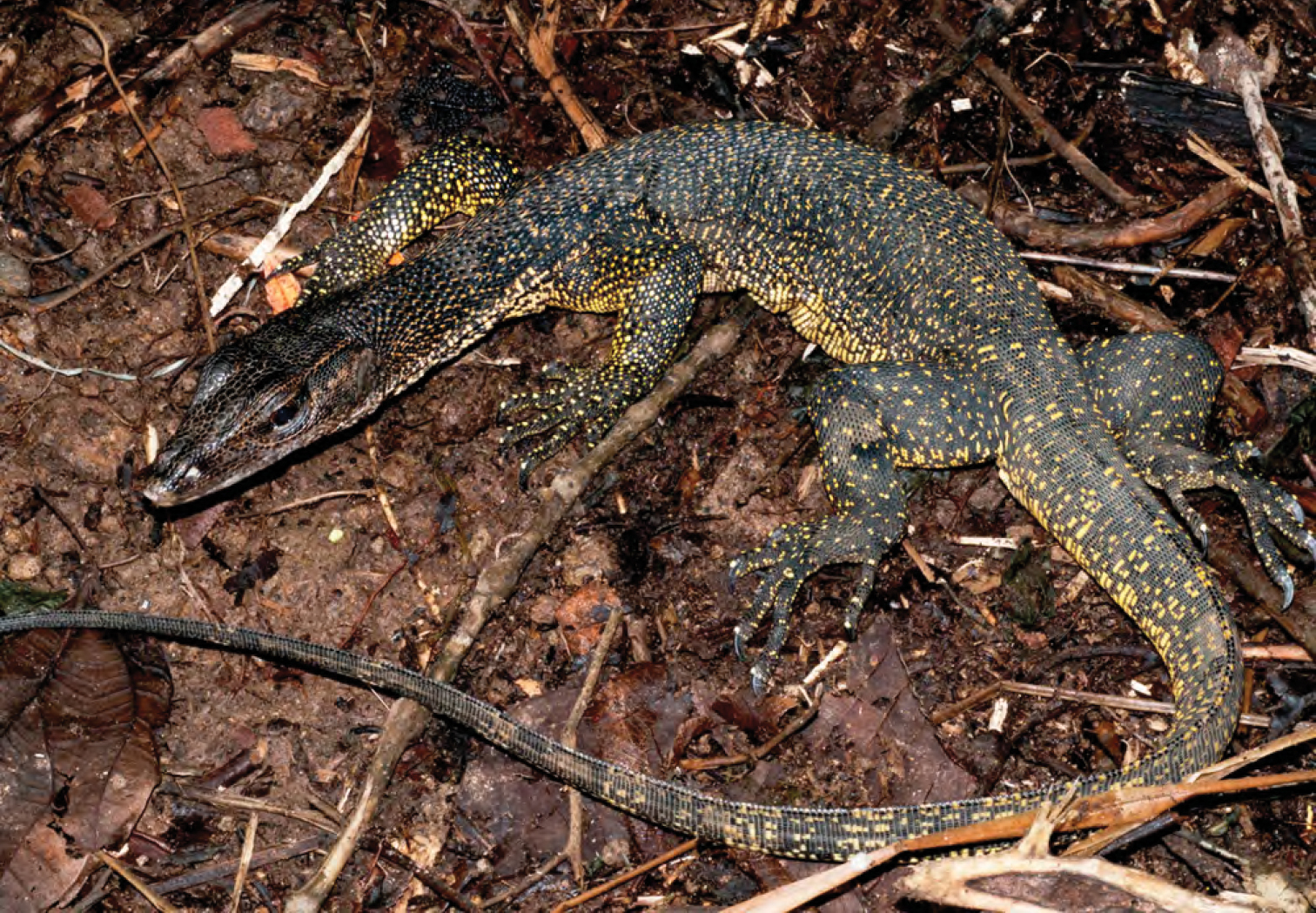
- On Mt. Cagua

Conservation status
- Least Concern (IUCN 3.1)

Scientific classification
- Kingdom: Animalia
- Phylum: Chordata
- Class: Reptilia
- Order: Squamata
- Suborder: Anguimorpha
- Family: Varanidae
- Genus: Varanus
- Subgenus: Soterosaurus
- Species: V. marmoratus

Binomial name
- Varanus marmoratus (Wiegmann, 1834)
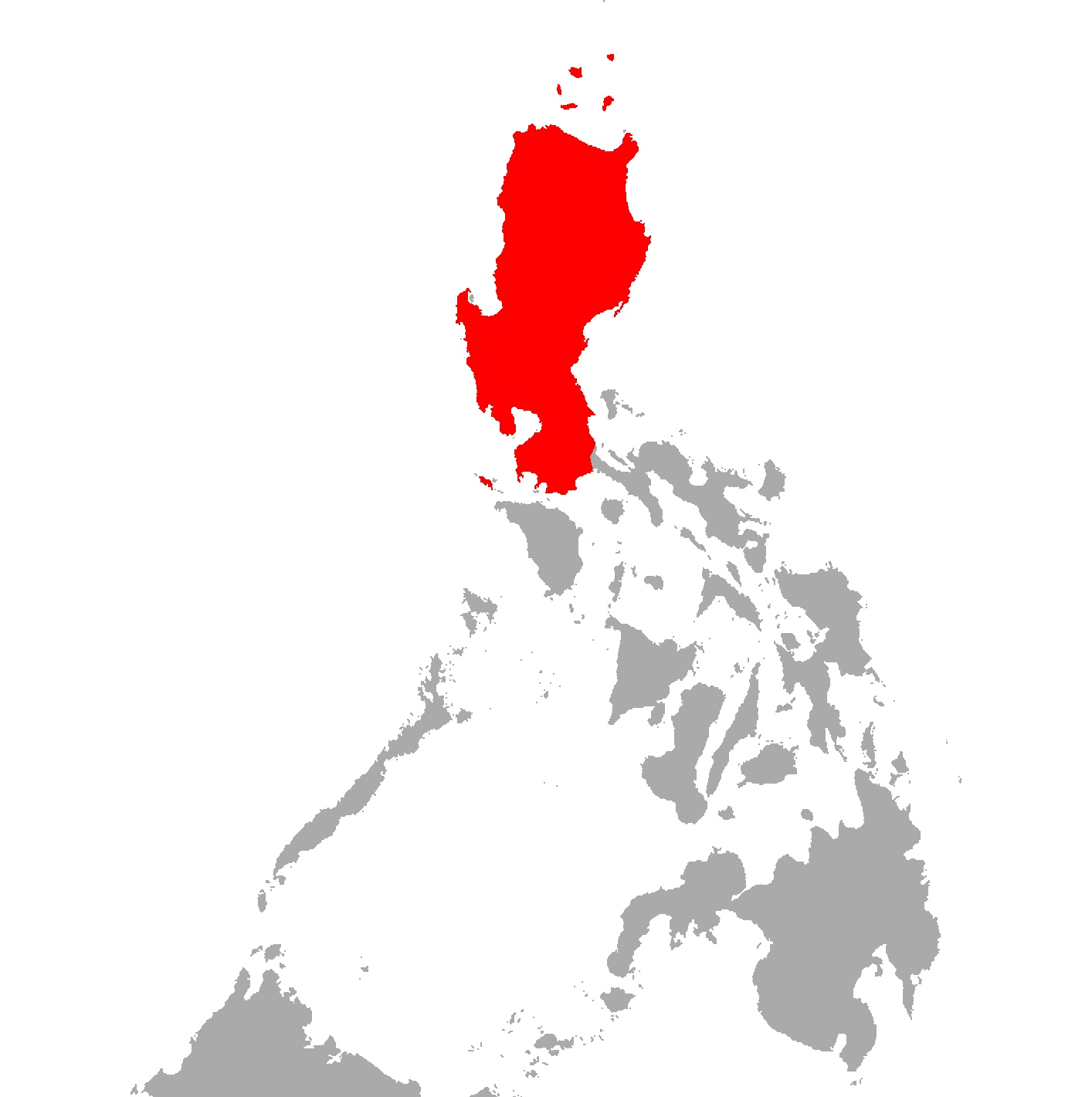

Synonyms
- Hydrosaurus marmoratus Wiegmann, 1834; Monitor bivittatus philippensis Schlegel, 1844; Varanus manilensis Martens, 1876; Varanus salvator marmoratus — Mertens, 1942; Varanus salvator philippinensis Deraniyagala, 1944; Varanus marmoratus — Koch et al., 2007; Varanus (Soterosaurus) marmoratus — Koch et al., 2010

= Marbled water monitor =

Species of lizard

The marbled water monitor (Varanus marmoratus), also known commonly as the Philippine water monitor, is a large species of monitor lizard in the family Varanidae. The species is endemic to the Philippines.

== Description ==
Varanus marmoratus can reach a total length (including tail) of 2 m (6.6 ft).

== Geographic range ==
The marbled water monitor lizard is found on various islands of the noveleta, including Batanes Islands, Babuyan Islands, northern and central Luzon and Lubang Island.

== Reproduction ==
Varanus marmoratus is oviparous.

== Taxonomy ==
The monitor lizard from Palawan, Mindoro, southern Luzon and the Sulu Archipelago was recently described as a new species, Varanus palawanensis.

== See also ==
- Asian water monitor
