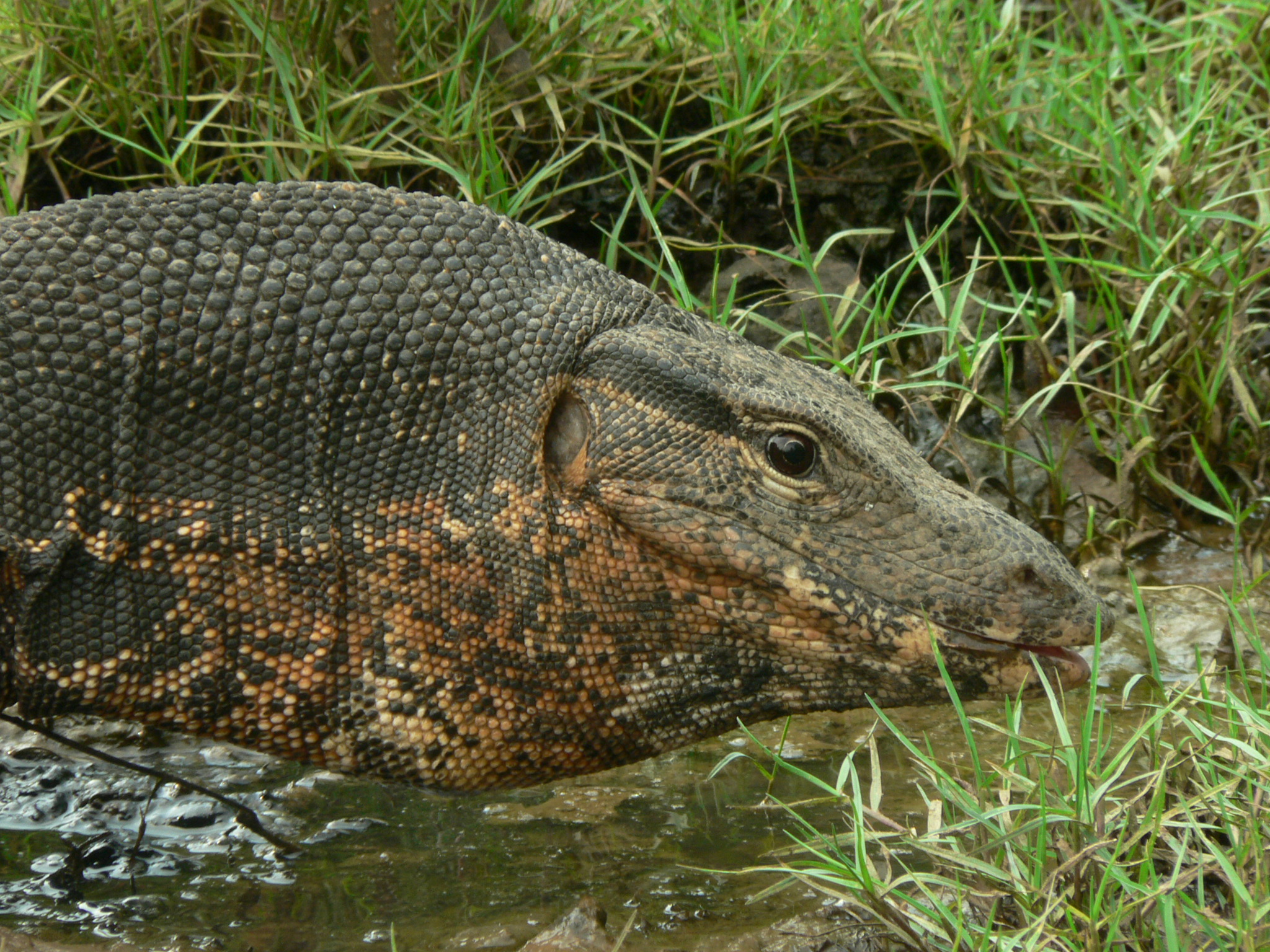
- Asian water monitor (Varanus salvator)

Scientific classification
- Kingdom: Animalia
- Phylum: Chordata
- Class: Reptilia
- Order: Squamata
- Suborder: Anguimorpha
- Family: Varanidae
- Genus: Varanus
- Subgenus: Soterosaurus; Ziegler & Bohme, 1997

Species
- V. bangonorum; V. cumingi; V. dalubhasa; V. marmoratus; V. nuchalis; V. palawanensis; V. rasmusseni; V. rudicollis; V. salvator; V. samarensis; V. togianus
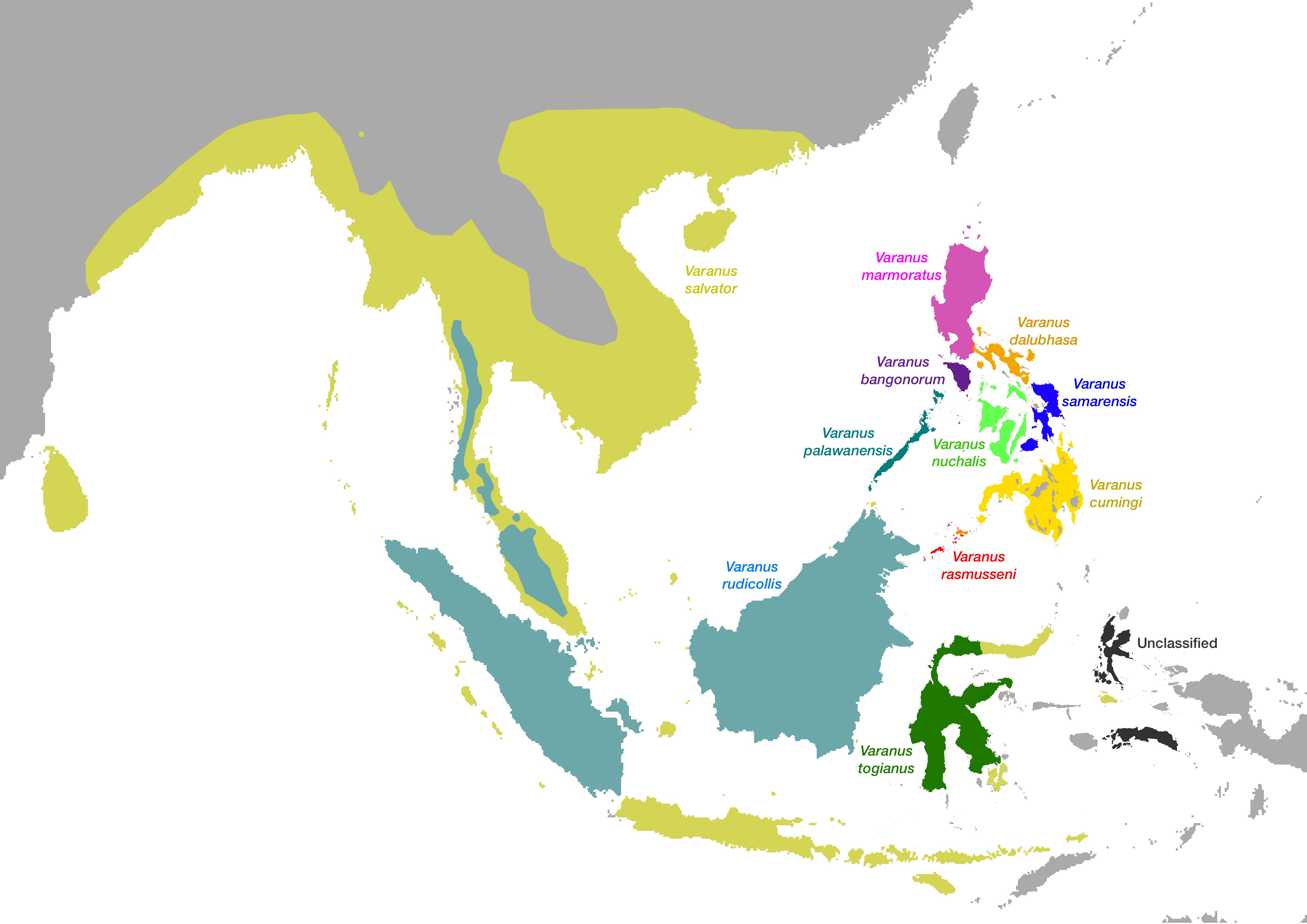

= Varanus (Soterosaurus) =

Soterosaurus

Subgenus of reptiles

Soterosaurus is a subgenus of monitor lizards commonly known as Southeast Asian water monitors. Most species are endemic to the Philippines, but black rough-necked monitors, Asian water monitors, and Togian water monitors can be found elsewhere in Southeast Asia.

== Classification ==
The black rough-necked monitor (V. rudicollis) was previously in the closely related subgenus Empagusia, but genomic analyses show it is actually the basalmost member of Soterosaurus, having split from the V. salvator species complex (which is composed of all the other Southeast Asian water monitor species) 14 million years ago during the middle Miocene.

== Behaviour ==
These large semi-aquatic lizards have laterally flattened tails, making them excellent swimmers. While all are terrestrial, some species, especially the black rough-necked monitor, may also have varying degrees of arboreal habits.

== Species ==
| Species | Image |
|---|---|
| Bangon monitor (V. bangonorum) | |
| Cuming's water monitor (V. cumingi) | |
| Enteng's monitor (V. dalubhasa) | |
| Marbled water monitor (V. marmoratus) | |
| Large-scaled water monitor (V. nuchalis) | |
| Palawan water monitor (V. palawanensis) | |
| Rasmussen's water monitor (V. rasmusseni) | |
| Black rough-necked monitor (V. rudicollis) | |
| Asian water monitor (V. salvator) | |
| Samar water monitor (V. samarensis) | |
| Togian water monitor (V. togianus) | |
