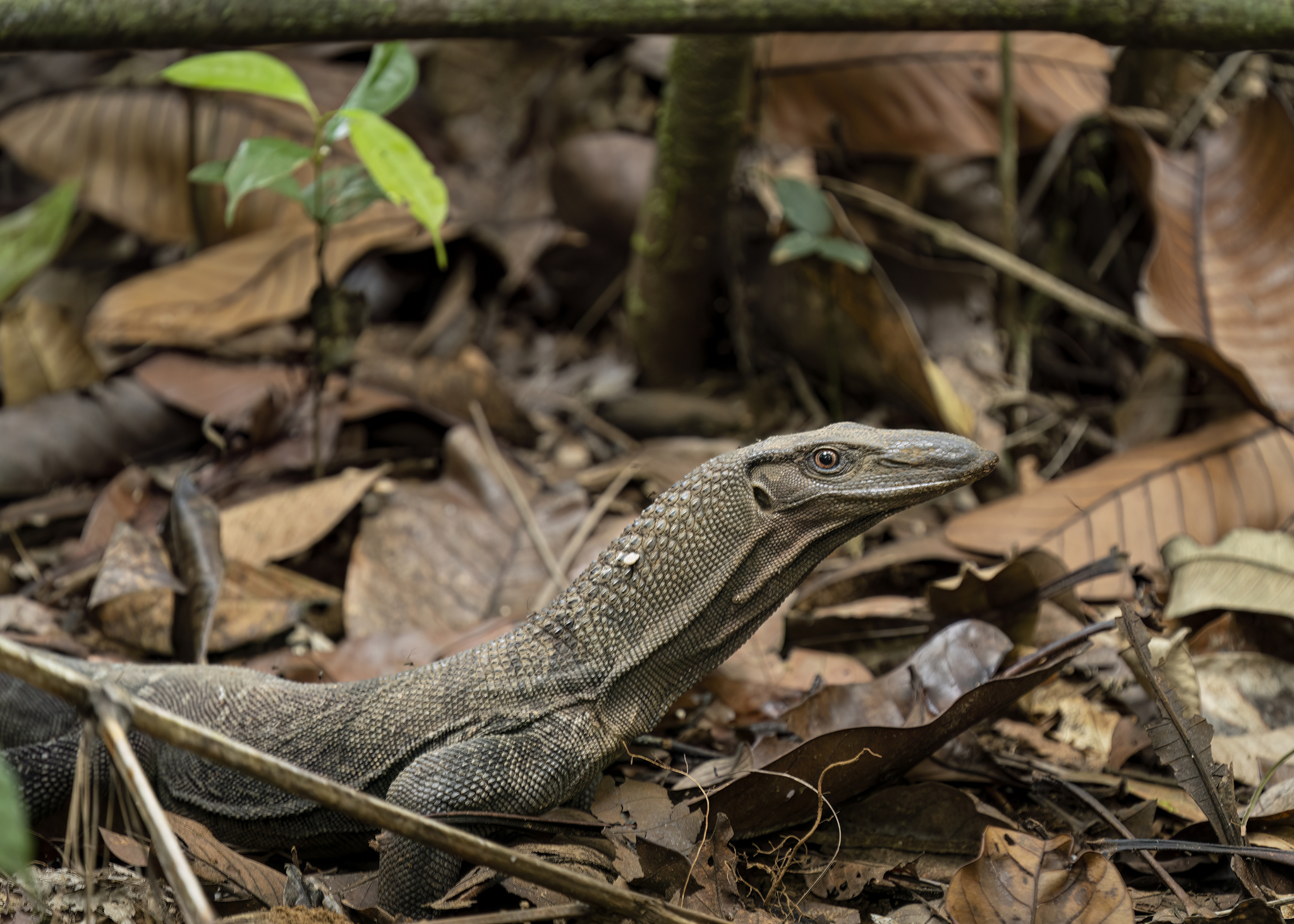

Conservation status
- Data Deficient (IUCN 3.1)
- CITES Appendix II

Scientific classification
- Kingdom: Animalia
- Phylum: Chordata
- Class: Reptilia
- Order: Squamata
- Suborder: Anguimorpha
- Family: Varanidae
- Genus: Varanus
- Subgenus: Soterosaurus
- Species: V. rudicollis

Binomial name
- Varanus rudicollis (Gray, 1845)
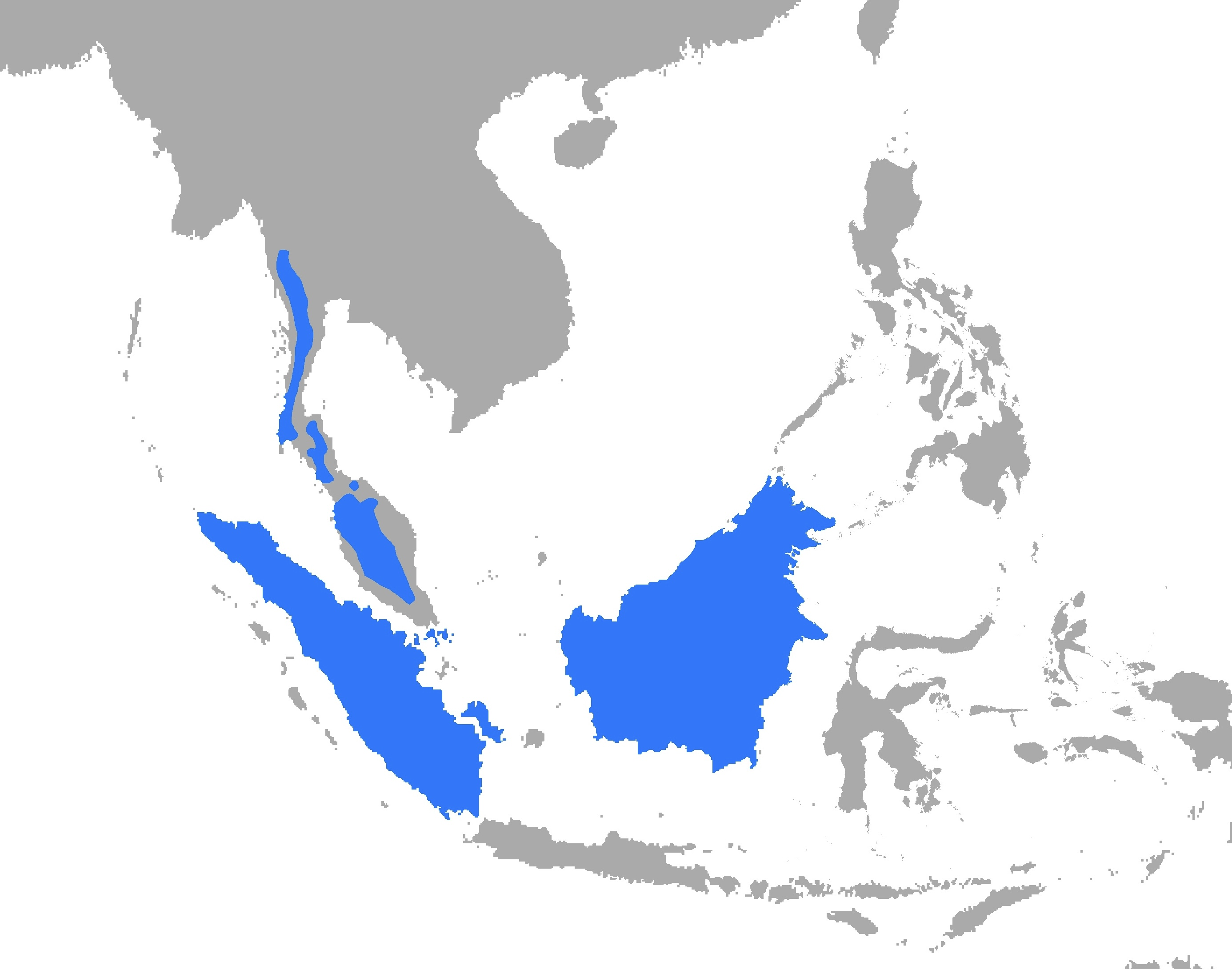

= Roughneck monitor =

Rough-necked monitor

Species of lizard

The black rough-necked monitor (Varanus rudicollis) is a species of monitor lizard found in Southeast Asian countries of Thailand, Burma, and Malaysia. It is also found in Indonesia on Sumatra and islands of the Riau Archipelago It is sometimes known simply as the roughneck monitor. In Thailand is called h̄èā cĥāng (Thai: เห่าช้าง; "elephant bark/roar").

The habitat of Varanus rudicollis is limited to primary and secondary rainforest and mangrove swamps. In the wild the black rough-necked monitor is very rarely seen, but whether this is because of its rarity or its very secretive behavior is uncertain. They are often kept successfully in captivity, but have a shy disposition.

This species is most closely related to its sister group, the water monitor species complex (e.g., the Asian water monitor) which are also in the subgenus Soterosaurus, having split from them 14 million years ago in the middle Miocene.

== Description ==
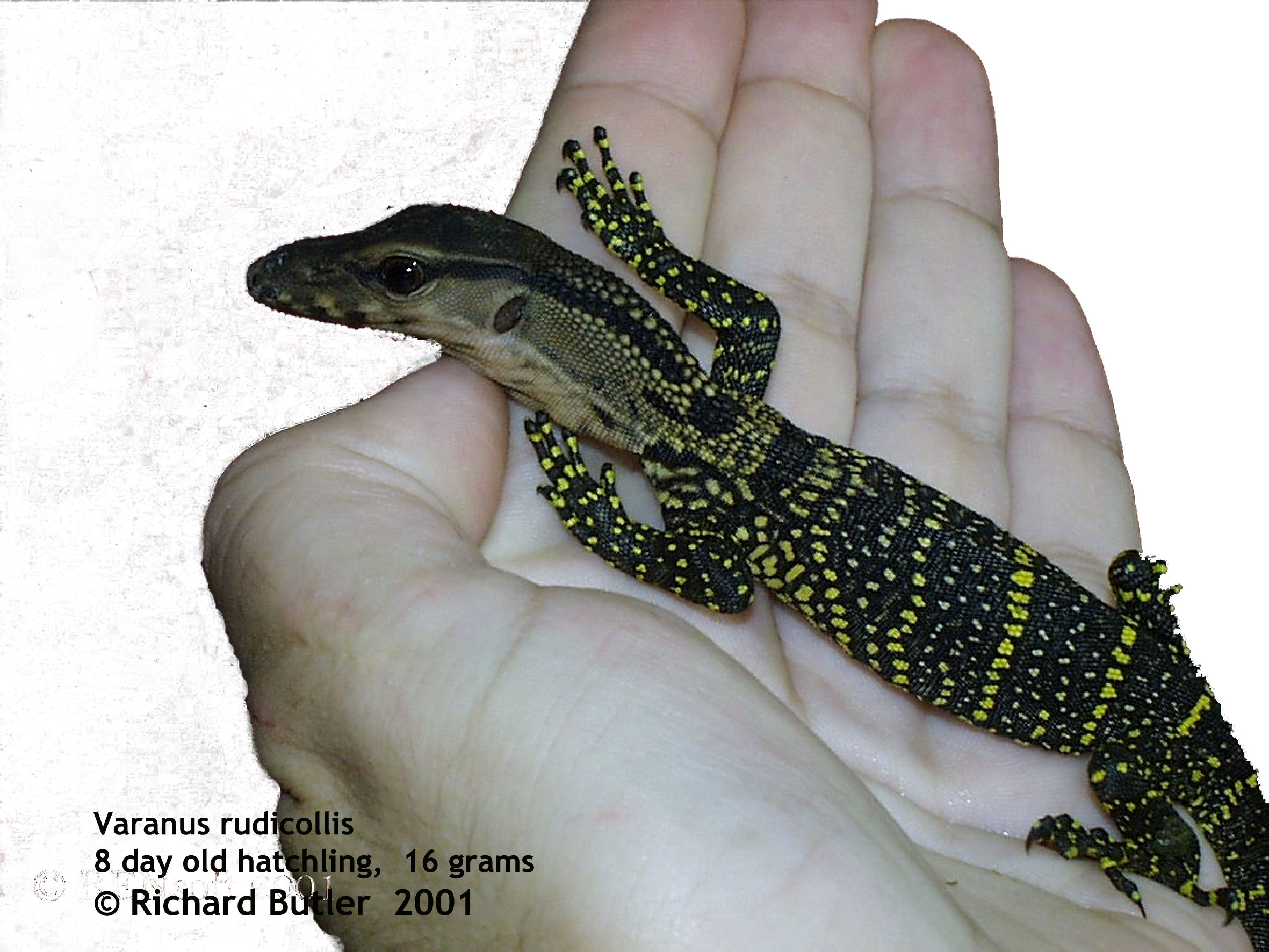
Hatchling

The black roughneck is a medium to large monitor. It usually reaches an average adult size of 3–4 ft. (90–120 cm), with a maximum length of 5 feet (150 cm), reported. The black rough-necked monitor can be easily recognized by large pointed scales adorning the necks of adults. They are a gracile, long-bodied lizard with a prominently pointed snout. Black roughnecks are known for their very calm temperament, rarely biting or tail whipping in captivity. When threatened they prefer to escape, urinate or defecate, puff up their throats or "go necrotic" by closing their eyes as if playing dead.

== Diet habits ==
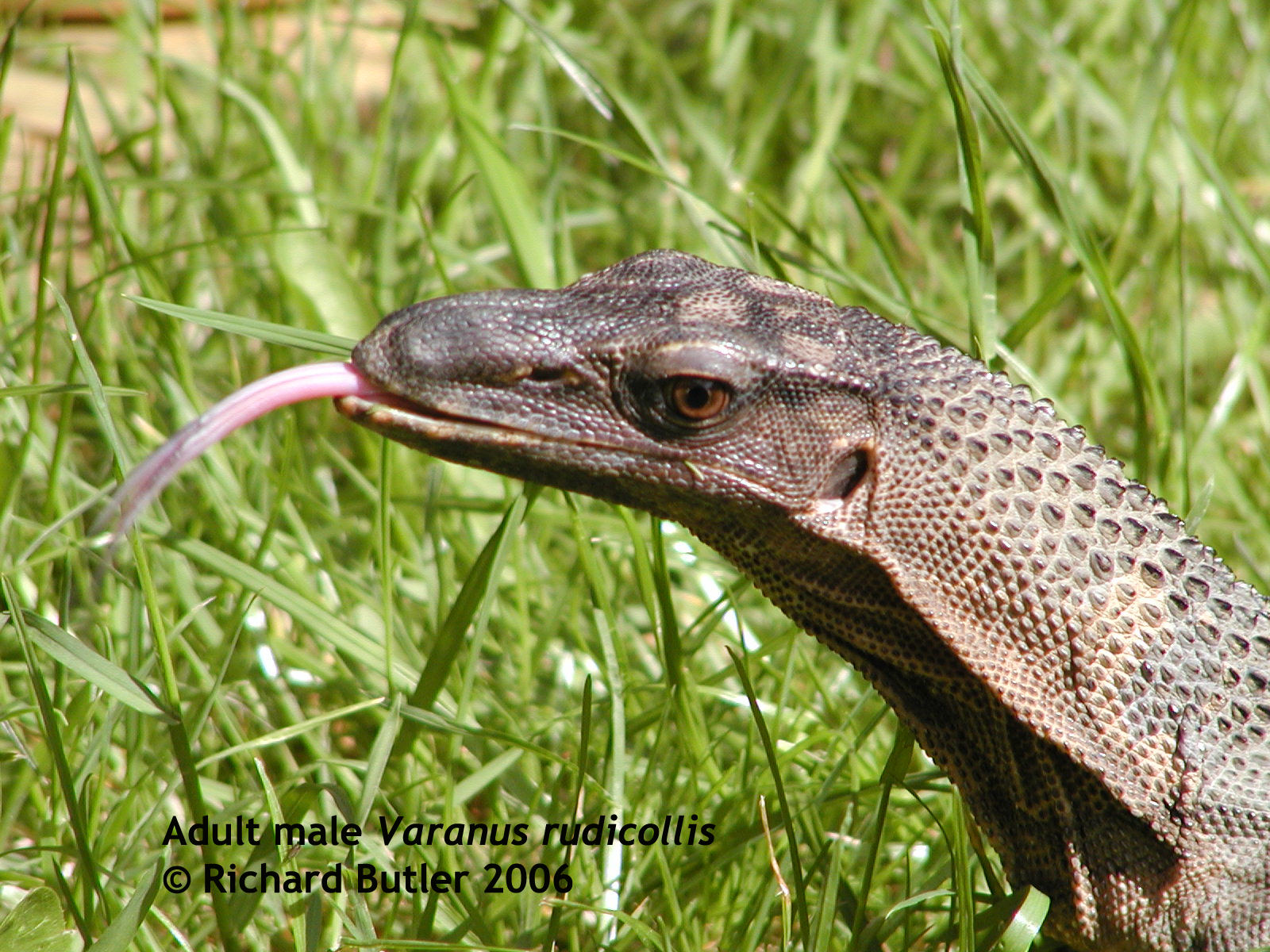
Adult male

The dietary habits of black rough-necked monitors have been the subject of various studies. Early research by Schnider (in Werner 1900) found insects in specimen from Sumatra. Mertens (1942) suggested that ants and possibly termites were a significant part of their diet, collected using their tongue. Auffenberg (1988) supported this by discovering termites, large stick insects, and tree centipedes in specimens from Malaysia. Brandenberg (1983) found a stomach full of large cockroaches and grasshoppers in one individual, while another from Surat Thani in Thailand had a stomach full of crabs (Nabhitabhata, pers. comm.). Further research by Losos and Greene (1988) revealed that the diet of V. rudicollis may include frogs and their eggs, spiders, scorpions, crabs, cockroaches, beetles, and orthopterans.

These monitors may remain active throughout the year, with their presence most noticeable during months of heavy rainfall

== Lifespan ==
The known lifespan of black rough-necked monitor is about 10–20 years in captivity.
