= Varanus dalubhasa =

Scientific classification
- Kingdom: Animalia
- Phylum: Chordata
- Class: Reptilia
- Order: Squamata
- Suborder: Anguimorpha
- Family: Varanidae
- Genus: Varanus
- Subgenus: Soterosaurus
- Species: V. dalubhasa

Binomial name
- Varanus dalubhasa Welton, Travers, Siler, & Brown, 2014
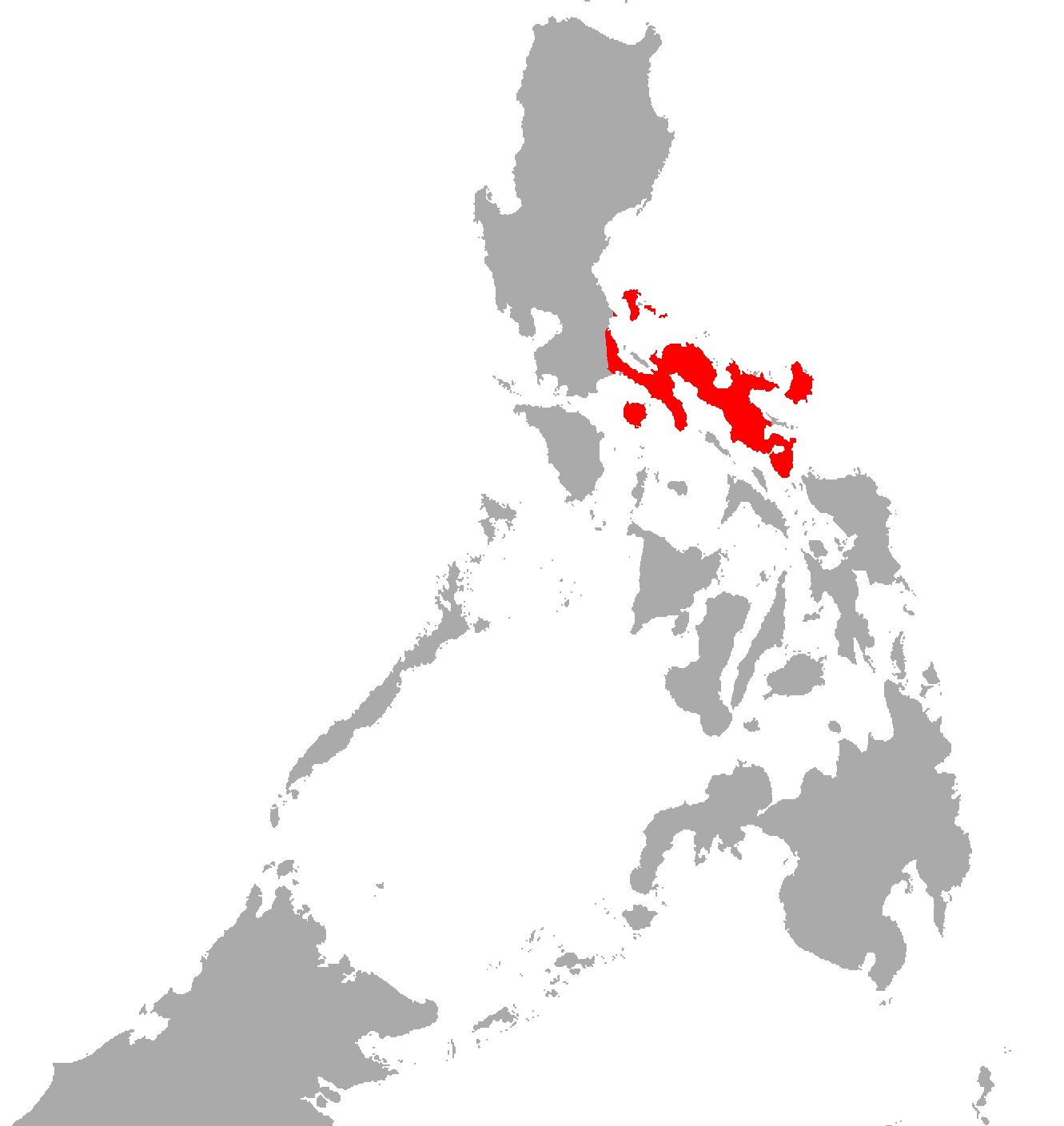

Species of lizard

Varanus dalubhasa, Enteng's monitor lizard, is a species of lizard of the Varanidae family. It is found in the Philippines.
