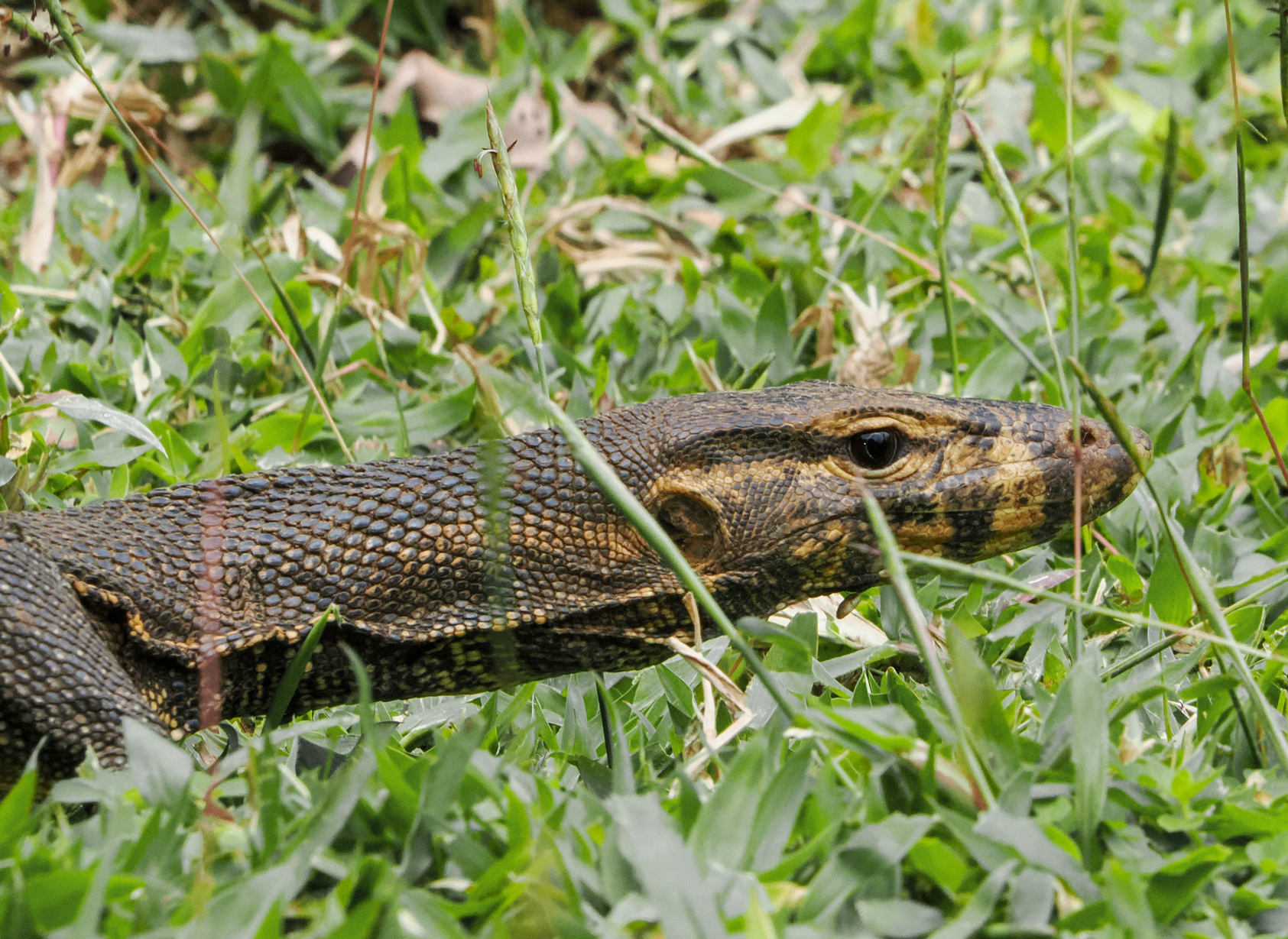

Conservation status
- Least Concern (IUCN 3.1)

Scientific classification
- Kingdom: Animalia
- Phylum: Chordata
- Class: Reptilia
- Order: Squamata
- Suborder: Anguimorpha
- Family: Varanidae
- Genus: Varanus
- Subgenus: Soterosaurus
- Species: V. togianus

Binomial name
- Varanus togianus (Peters, 1872)
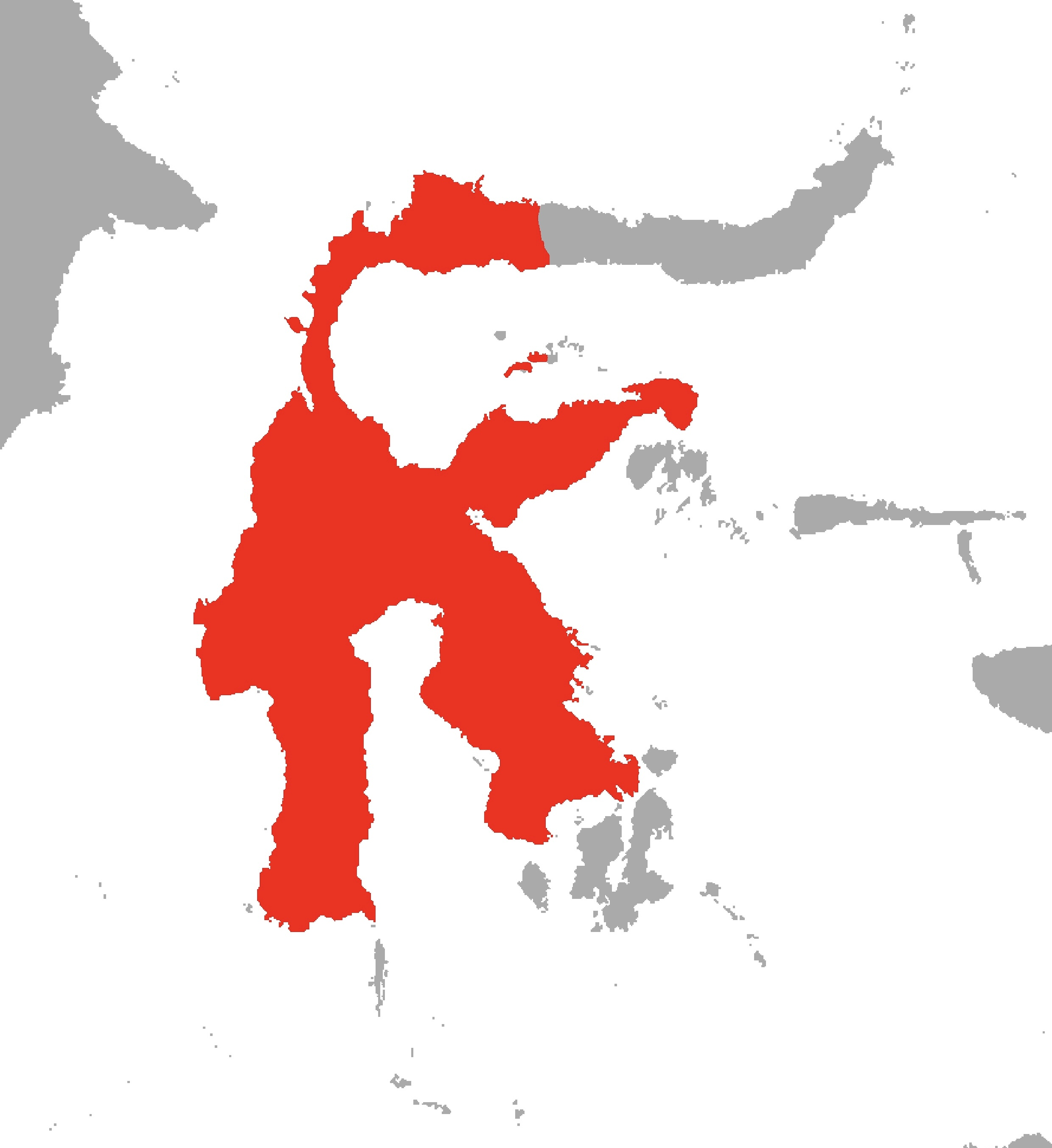

= Togian water monitor =

Species of lizard

The Togian water monitor (Varanus togianus) is a species of monitor lizard.

It is endemic to the Togian Islands of Sulawesi, Indonesia.

The species is found primarily in forests and mangroves. It feeds on invertebrates including insects and arachnids as well as turtle and bird eggs.

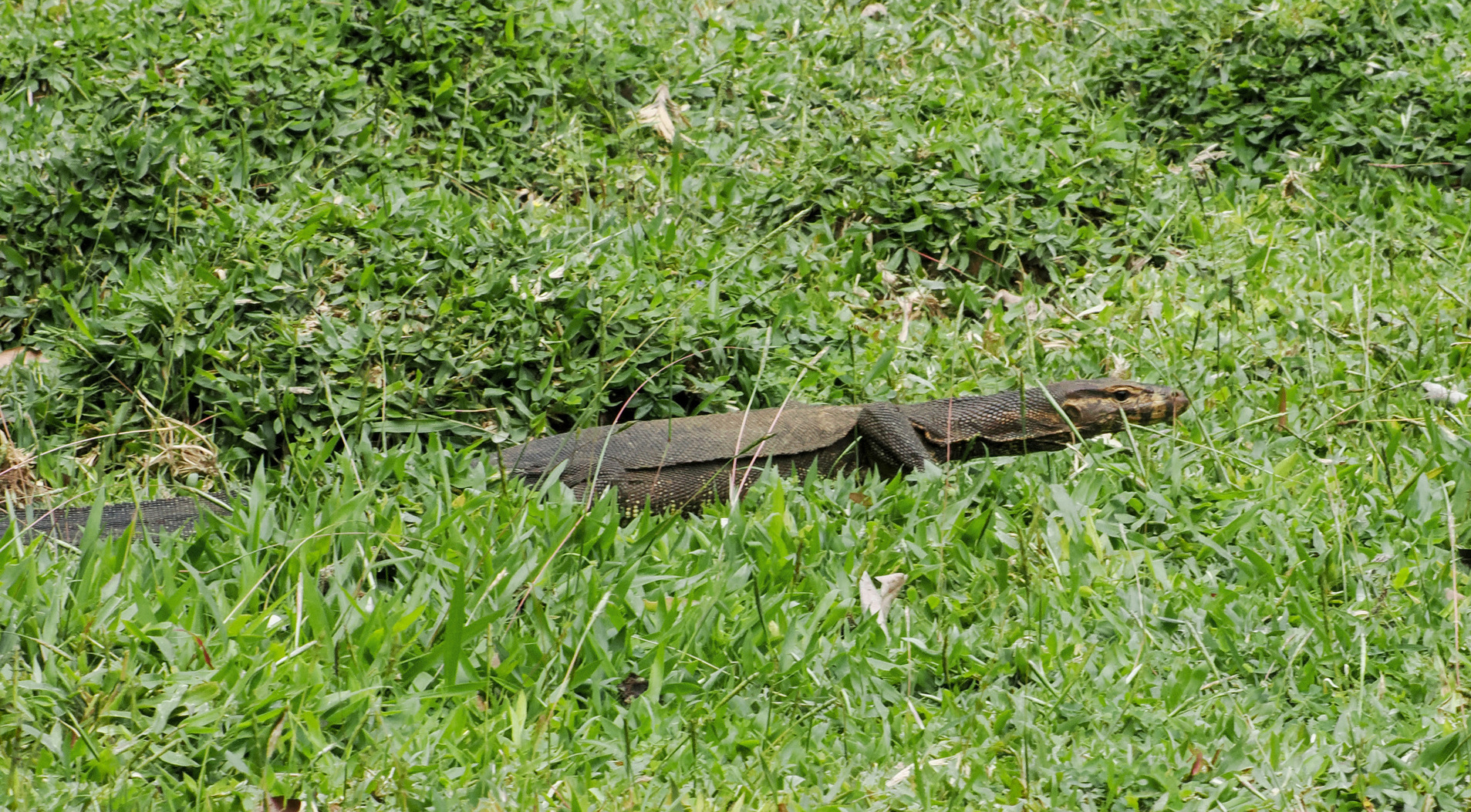
Maros Regency, South Sulawesi, Indonesia
