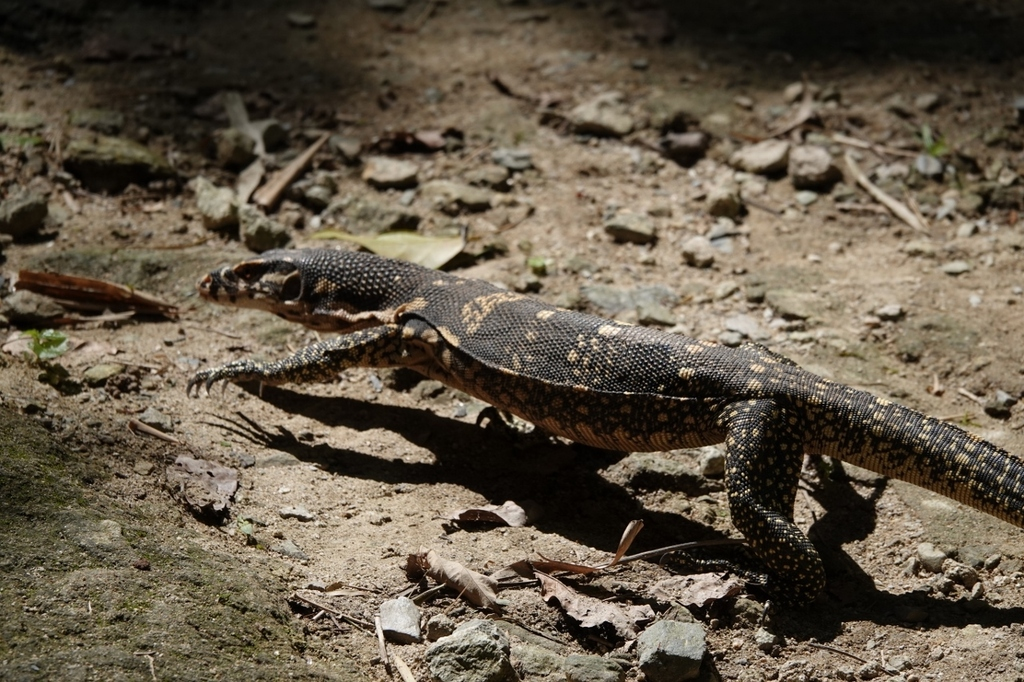

Conservation status
- Least Concern (IUCN 3.1)

Scientific classification
- Kingdom: Animalia
- Phylum: Chordata
- Class: Reptilia
- Order: Squamata
- Suborder: Anguimorpha
- Family: Varanidae
- Genus: Varanus
- Subgenus: Soterosaurus
- Species: V. bangonorum

Binomial name
- Varanus bangonorum Welton, Travers, Siler, & Brown, 2014
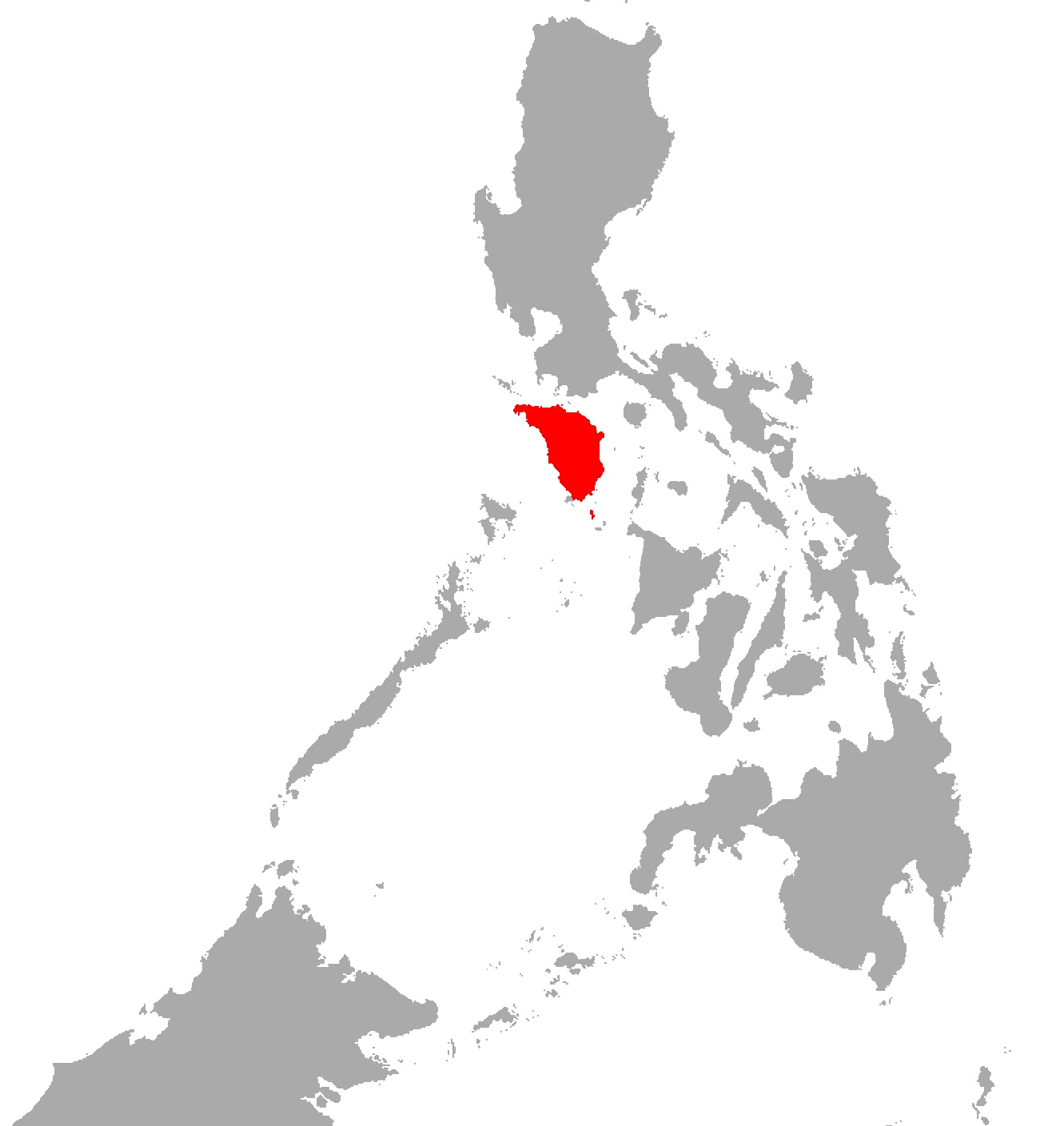

= Varanus bangonorum =

Bangon monitor

Species of lizard

Bangon monitor (Varanus bangonorum) is a species of monitor lizard. It is found on the islands of Mindoro and Semirara in the Philippines.
