= Maren Gaulke =

German herpetologist (born 1955)

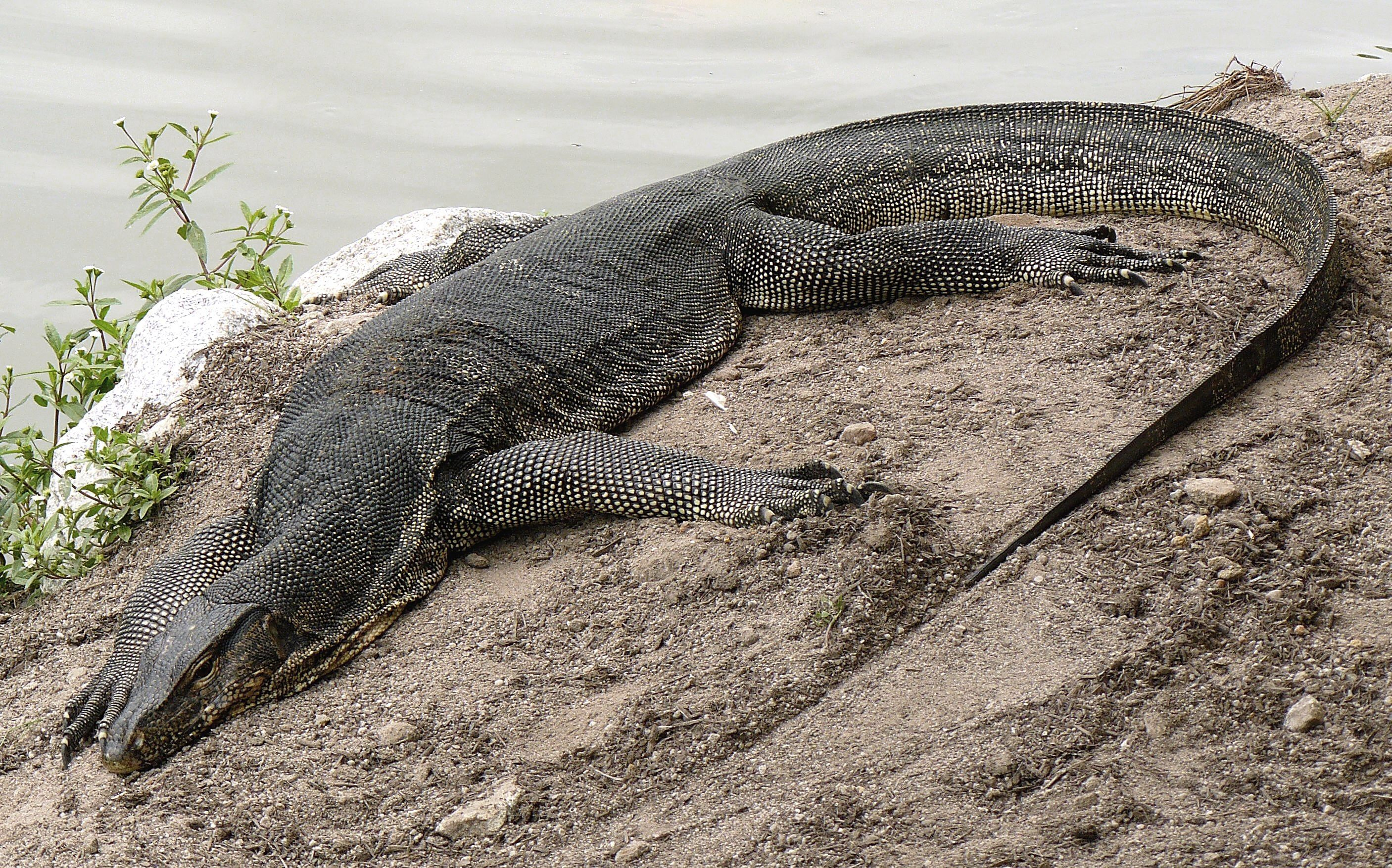
Asian water monitor (Varanus salvator)

Maren Birgit Gaulke (born 4 April 1955) is a German herpetologist whose research focus has been the biology of monitor lizards, snakes, and turtles. She is a consultant with national and international institutions and contributes to status classifications of endangered species and the establishment of protected areas.

== Biography ==
A student of earth and life sciences, Gaulke received her doctorate from the University of Kiel in 1988. In the mid-1980s she began her field work in Southeast Asia and the Philippines, where her biological studies collected new insights into the ecology, ethology, and trophic dependencies of tropical animals. This led to the first description of several new reptile species, including Cyclemys pulchristriata Fritz, Gaulke & Lehr, 1997; Dendrelaphis flavescens Gaulke, 1994; Gekko ernstkelleri Rösler, Siler, Brown, Demegillo & Gaulke, 2006; Luperosaurus corfieldi Gaulke, Rösler & Brown, 2007; and Lycodon fausti Gaulke, 2002.

Her main interest is monitor lizards, close relatives of the Komodo dragon, which are the world's largest living lizards. She described the species Varanus mabitang Gaulke & Curio, 2001; Varanus palawanensis Koch, Gaulke & Böhme, 2010; Varanus rasmusseni Koch, Gaulke & Böhme, 2010; and Varanus samarensis Koch, Gaulke & Böhme, 2010. In 2017, she was part of the first team to describe the Philippine frog species Sanguirana acai from the islands of Negros, Masbate, and Panay.

Gaulke works as a consultant with national and international institutions on the status classification of endangered species and the establishment of protected areas. She is also an "extraordinary employee" at the Geobio Center at LMU Munich.

== Selected publications ==
As main author or co-author, Gaulke has published the books Nature Travel Guide Philippines (2002), Nature Travel Guide Australia (2007, with Alexander Volker Altenbach), Water Dragons and Sailors (2008, with Heiko Werning), and The Herpetofauna of Panay Island, Philippines (2011). She contributed chapters to the books Anoxia: Evidence for Eukaryote Survival and Paleontological Strategies (2012) by Alexander Volker Altenbach, Joan M. Bernhard, and Joseph Seckbach and Varanoid Lizards of the World (2004) by Eric Pianka, Dennis R. King, and Ruth Allen King. In addition, her scientific contributions have appeared in several international journals, including Hamadryad, Zootaxa, Elaphe, Herpetozoa, Asiatic Herpetological Research, Salamandra and Copeia.

== Dedication names ==
In 2008, herpetologists Gernot Vogel and Johan van Rooijen named the bronzeback snake species Dendrelaphis marenae in honor of Maren Gaulke.
