= Lycodon fausti =

Conservation status
- Least Concern (IUCN 3.1)

Scientific classification
- Kingdom: Animalia
- Phylum: Chordata
- Class: Reptilia
- Order: Squamata
- Suborder: Serpentes
- Family: Colubridae
- Genus: Lycodon
- Species: L. fausti

Binomial name
- Lycodon fausti Gaulke, 2002

Species of snake

Faust's wolf snake (Lycodon fausti) is a species of snake in the family colubridae. It is found in the Philippines.
