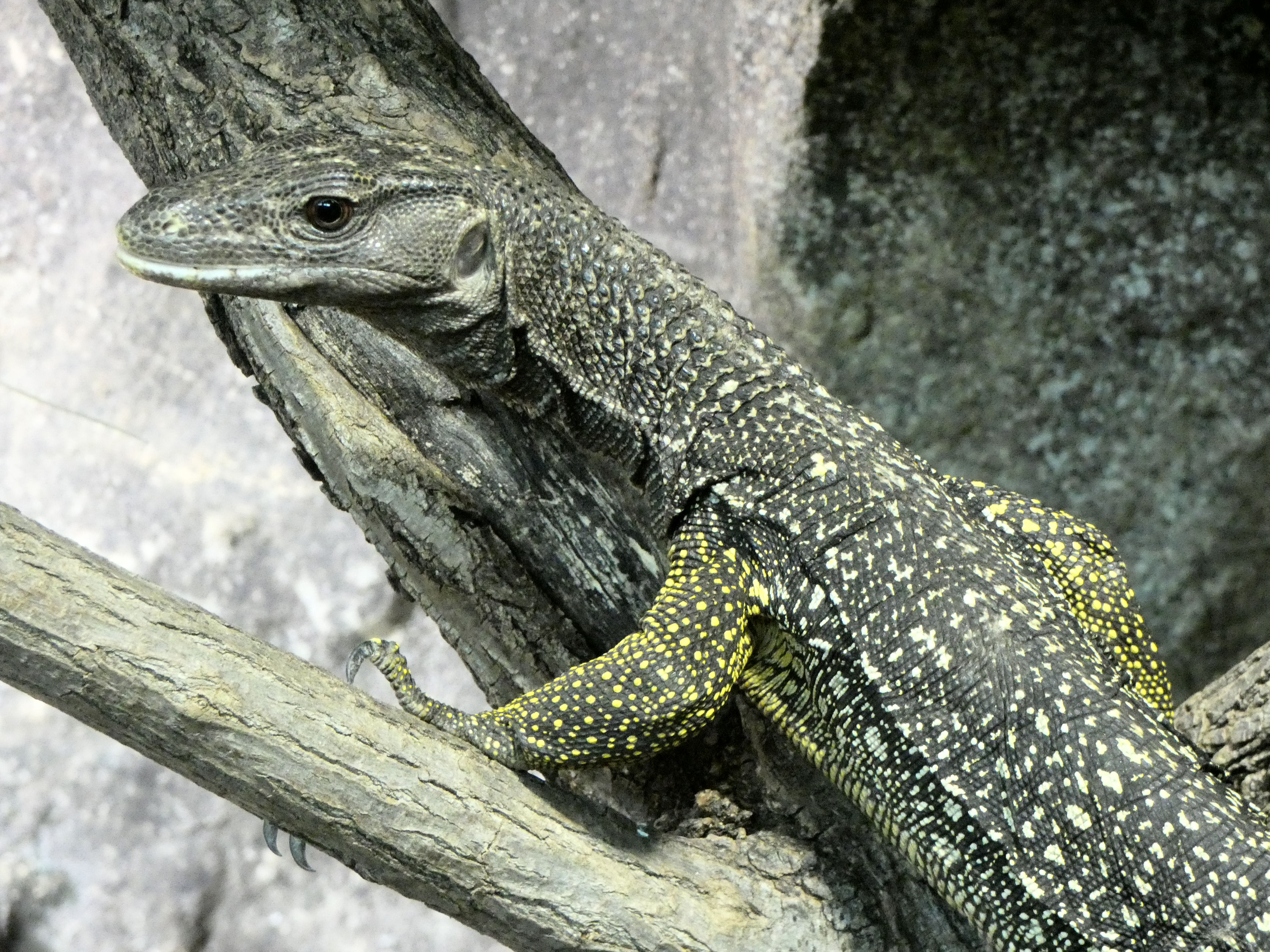

Conservation status
- Least Concern (IUCN 3.1)

Scientific classification
- Kingdom: Animalia
- Phylum: Chordata
- Class: Reptilia
- Order: Squamata
- Suborder: Anguimorpha
- Family: Varanidae
- Genus: Varanus
- Subgenus: Soterosaurus
- Species: V. nuchalis

Binomial name
- Varanus nuchalis (Günther, 1872)
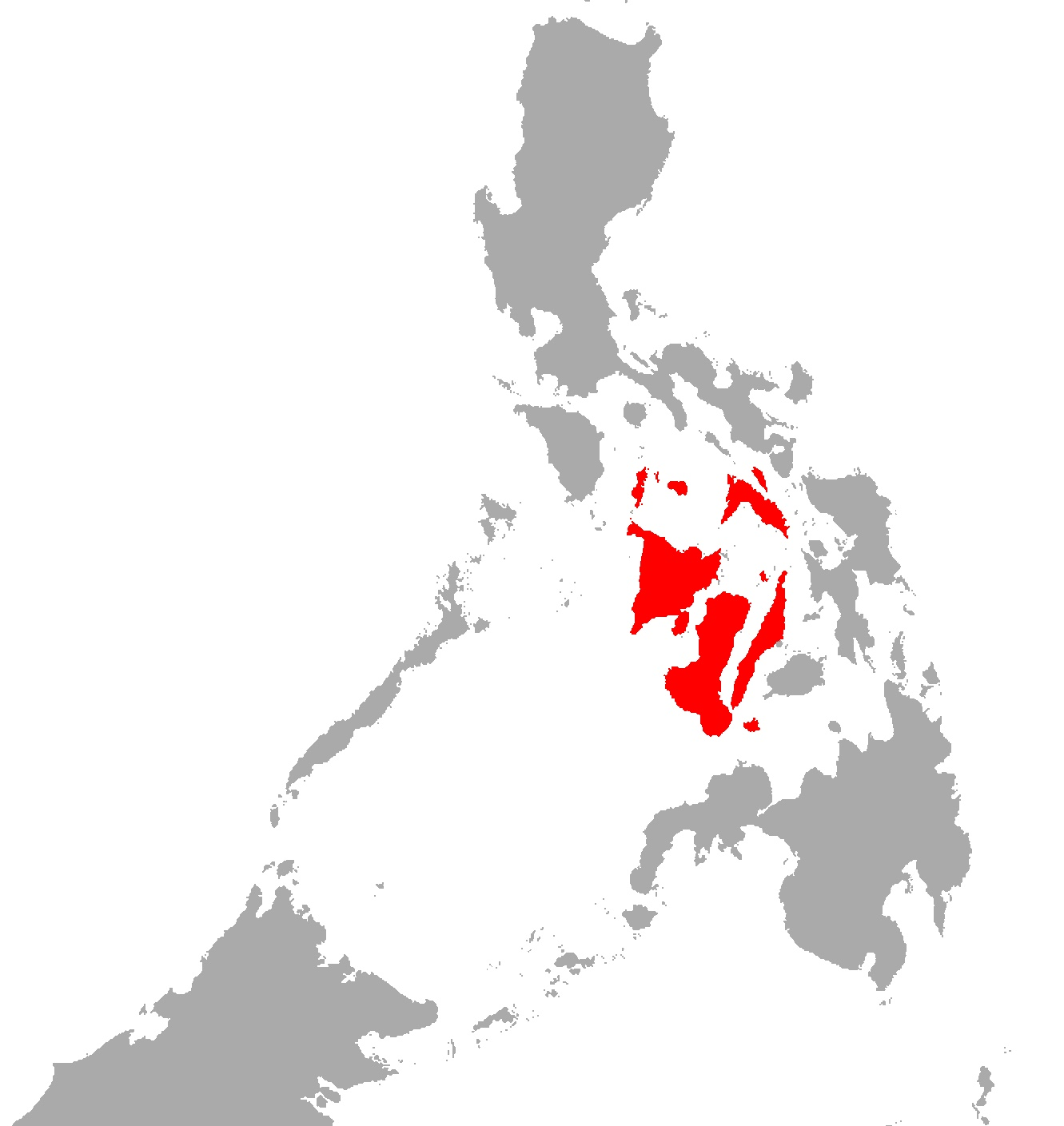

= Large-scaled water monitor =

Species of lizard

The large-scaled water monitor (Varanus nuchalis) is a species of monitor lizard.

It is endemic to the Philippines, where it is found on the islands of Cebu, Ticao, Negros, Panay and Masbate.

The species is found in a variety of habitats, primarily mangroves and lowland forests.
