= Gekko ernstkelleri =

Conservation status
- Least Concern (IUCN 3.1)

Scientific classification
- Kingdom: Animalia
- Phylum: Chordata
- Class: Reptilia
- Order: Squamata
- Suborder: Gekkota
- Family: Gekkonidae
- Genus: Gekko
- Species: G. ernstkelleri

Binomial name
- Gekko ernstkelleri Rösler, Siler, R. Brown, Demegillo & Gaulke, 2006
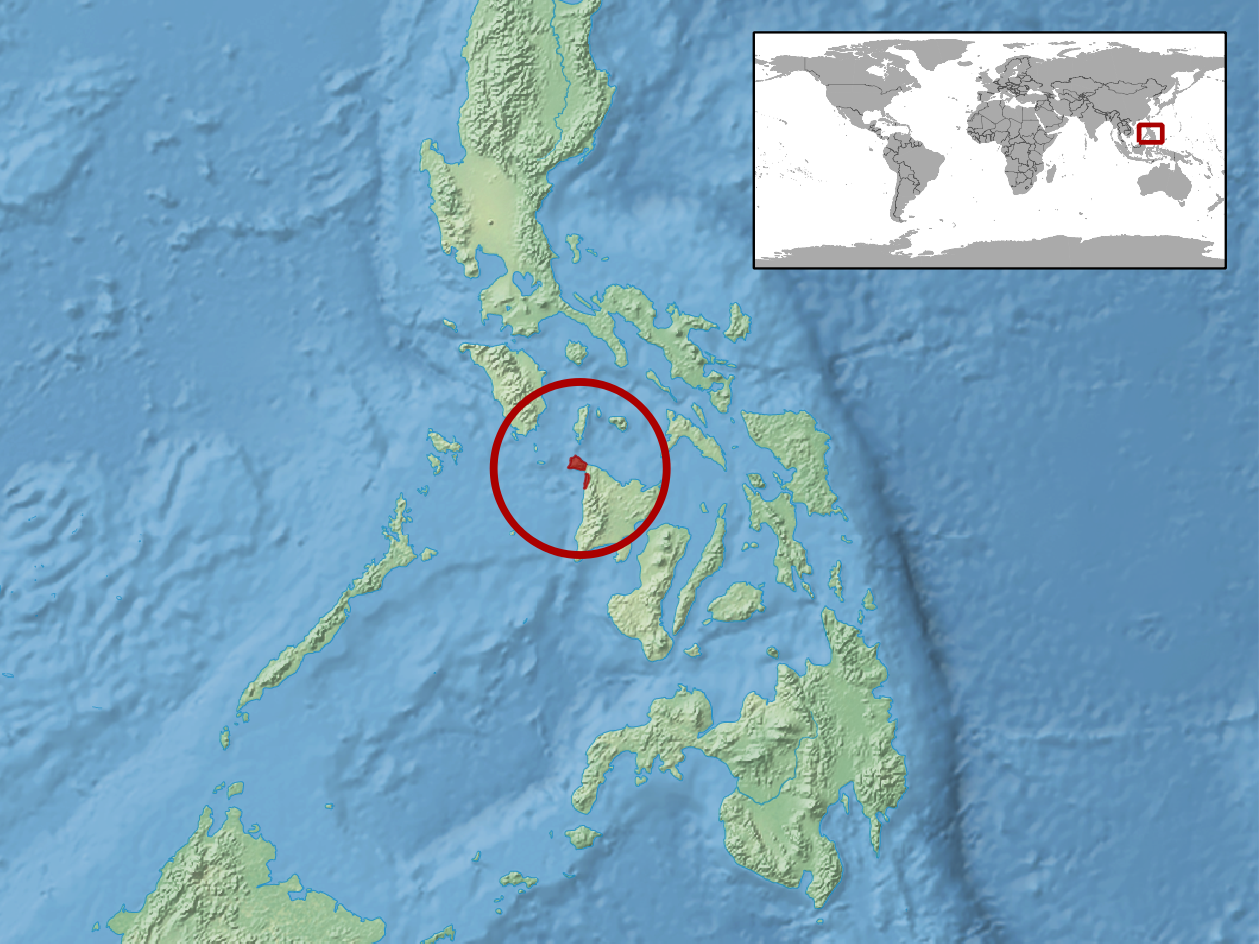

Species of lizard

Gekko ernstkelleri is a species of gecko, a lizard in the family Gekkonidae. The species is endemic to the Philippines.

== Etymology ==
The specific name, ernstkelleri, is in honor of Ernst Keller, who is a German supporter of gecko conservation.

== Geographic range ==
G. ernstkelleri is found on the northwest peninsula of the island of Panay in the Philippines.

== Description ==
The total length (including tail) of G. ernstkelleri can exceed 20 cm (7.9 in).

== Habitat ==
G. ernstkelleri lives in caves and near limestone outcrops in forested areas, as well as in disturbed areas near forests, at altitudes from sea level to 300 m (980 ft). It is locally common within its small range.
