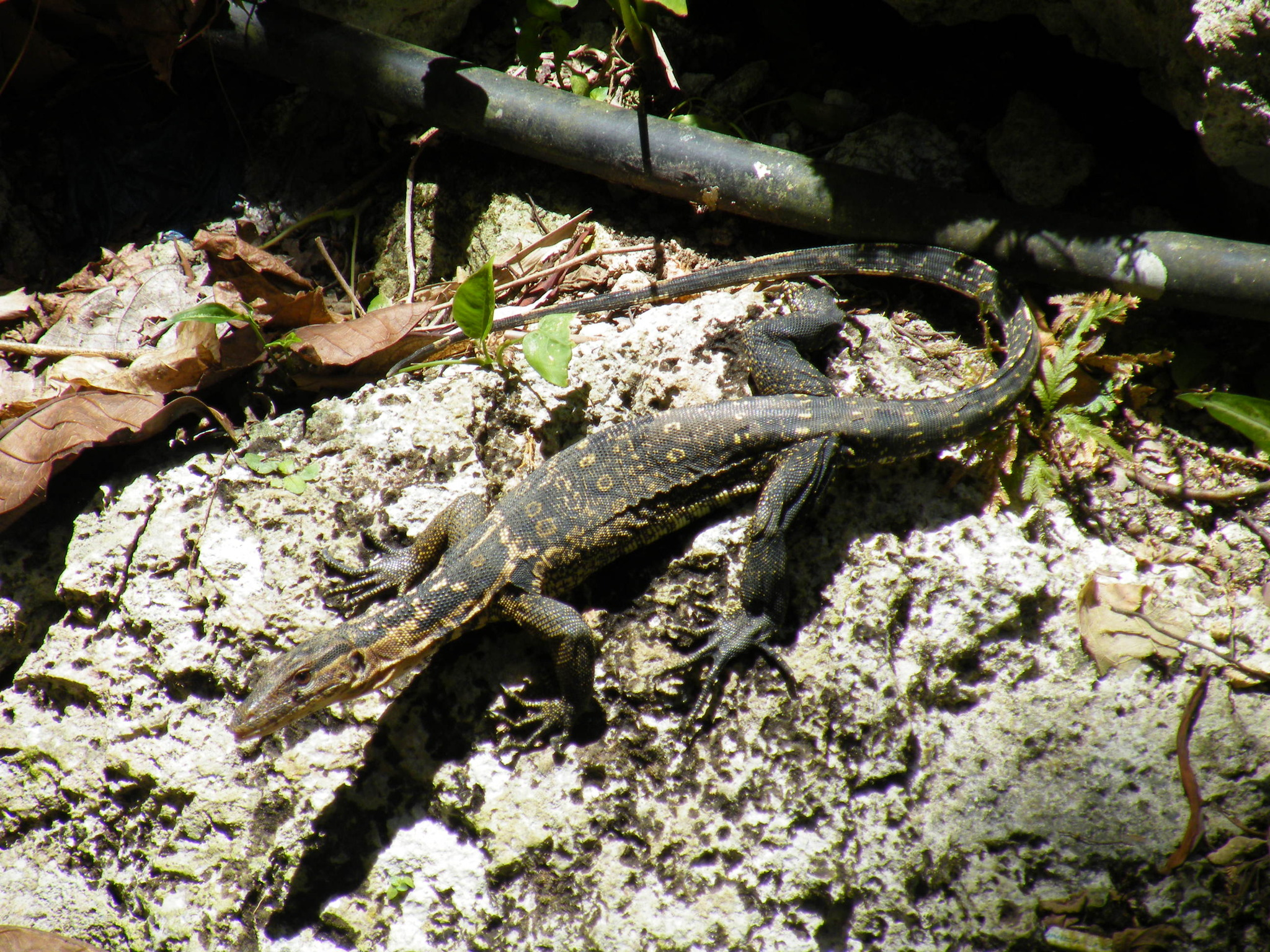

Scientific classification
- Kingdom: Animalia
- Phylum: Chordata
- Class: Reptilia
- Order: Squamata
- Suborder: Anguimorpha
- Family: Varanidae
- Genus: Varanus
- Subgenus: Soterosaurus
- Species: V. samarensis

Binomial name
- Varanus samarensis Koch, Gaulke, & Böhme, 2010
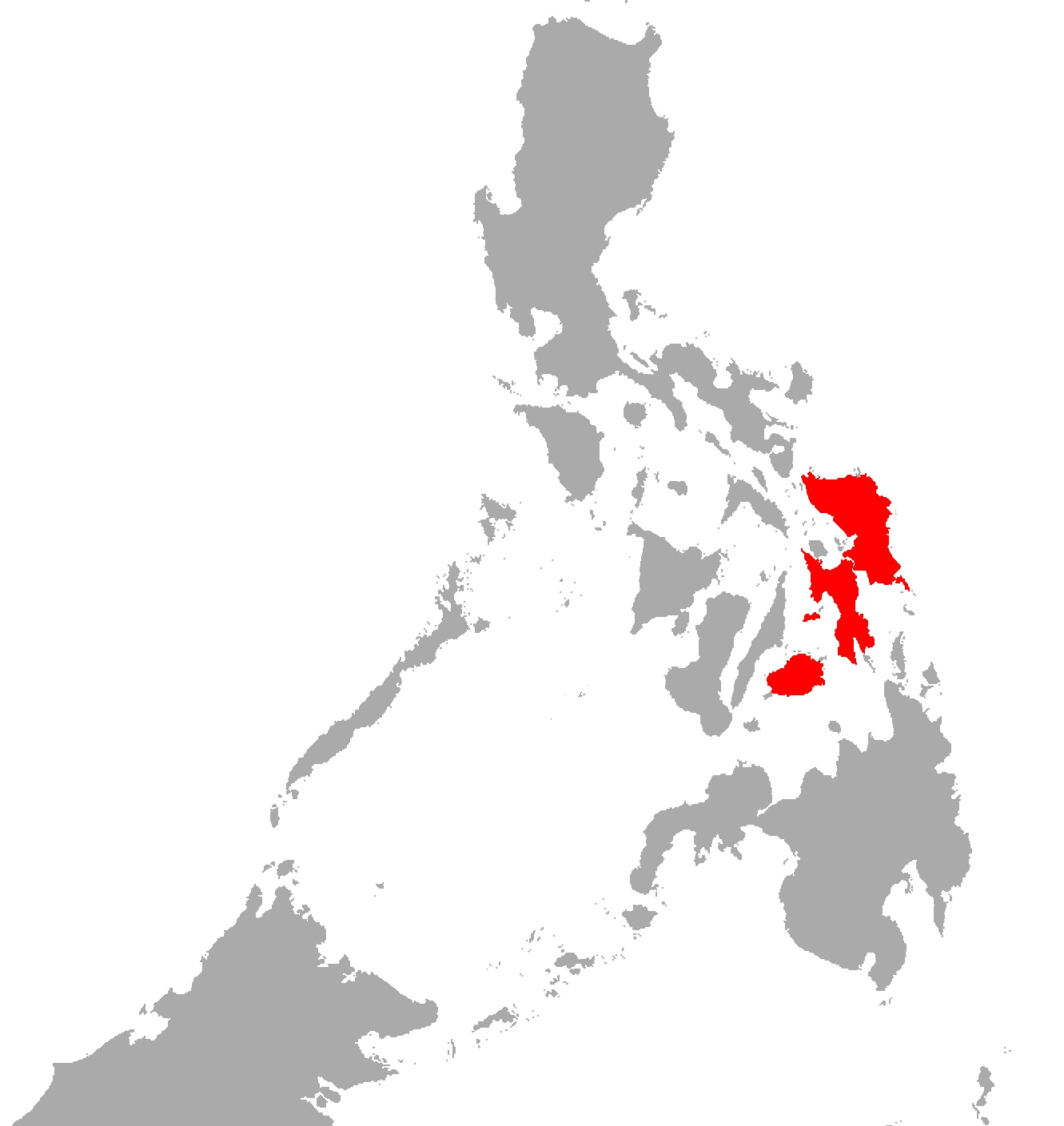

= Varanus samarensis =

Species of lizard

Varanus samarensis, the Samar water monitor, is a species of lizard of Varanidae family. It is found in the Philippines.
