= Varanus rasmusseni =

Conservation status
- Least Concern (IUCN 3.1)

Scientific classification
- Kingdom: Animalia
- Phylum: Chordata
- Class: Reptilia
- Order: Squamata
- Suborder: Anguimorpha
- Family: Varanidae
- Genus: Varanus
- Subgenus: Soterosaurus
- Species: V. rasmusseni

Binomial name
- Varanus rasmusseni Koch, Gaulke, & Böhme, 2010
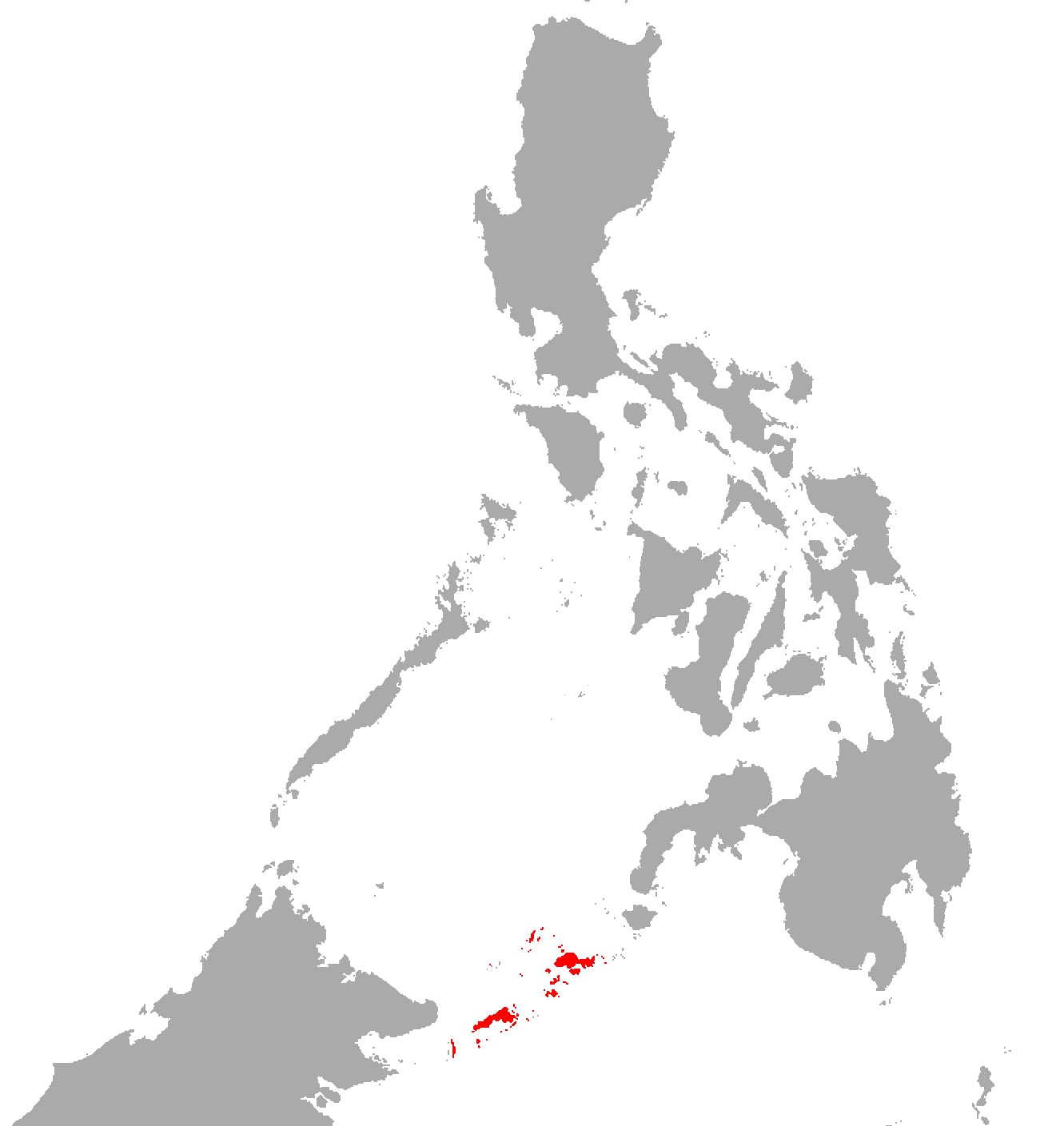

Species of lizard

Varanus rasmusseni is a species of monitor lizard. It is found in the Philippine islands of Tawi-Tawi, Jolo, and the Bitinan islands, in the Sulu Archipelago.

== Etymology ==
The specific name, rasmusseni, is in honor of Danish herpetologist Jens Bødtker Rasmussen
