= List of largest extant lizards =

Currently there are about 40 extant families of Lacertilia. These vary considerably, e.g. in shades, colours, and sizes. For example, the largest representative among Geckos, the New Caledonian giant gecko (Rhacodactylus leachianus), has a length of up to 36 cm (14 in), while the largest species in the family Varanidae, Komodo dragon (Varanus komodoensis), has a length up to 3 metres (10 ft), and a body mass of 70 kg (154 lbs).

== Largest extant lizards ==
Here are the 15 largest extant lizards based on the most reliable measurements for size, including length and weight. These include family types Varanidae, Iguanidae and Teiidae exceeding 9 kg (20 lbs) in mass.

Rank	Common name	Binomial name	Family	Maximum reliable or known mass kg (lb)	Maximum total length m (ft)	Endemic	Image
1	Komodo dragon	Varanus komodoensis	Varanidae	166 (366) in captivity 81.5 (180) caught in the wild, excluding stomach contents Probably 100 (220) including stomach contents (see below)	3.13 (10.27) in captivity 3.04 (9.97) caught in the wild (see below)	Indonesian islands of Komodo, Rinca, Flores, Gili Dasami, and Gili Motang	
2	Asian water monitor	Varanus salvator	Varanidae	25 (55) (see below)	3.21 (10.53) (see below)	South and Southeast Asia	
3	Crocodile monitor	Varanus salvadorii	Varanidae	20 (44.1) (see below)	2.55 (8.37) longest verified specimen, but unverified considerable larger (see below)	New Guinea	
4	Nile monitor	Varanus niloticus	Varanidae	20 (44.1) according to many sources (see below)	2.43 (8.0) the longest specimen (see below)	Sub-Saharan Africa	
5	Perentie	Varanus giganteus	Varanidae	20 (44.1) according to many sources (see below)	2.44 (8.0) the longest specimen (see below)	Australia	
6	Black-throated monitor	Varanus albigularis microsticus	Varanidae	27 (60)	2.1 (6.89)	Tanzania	
7	Lace monitor	Varanus varius	Varanidae	14 (30.87) more reliable (see below)	2.0 (6.55) (see below)	Eastern Australia	
8	Blue iguana	Cyclura lewisi	Iguanidae	14 (30.87)	1.5 (4.91)	Grand Cayman	
9	Galapagos land iguana	Conolophus subcristatus	Iguanidae	13 (28.66)	1.5 (4.91)	Galápagos Islands	
10	Marine iguana	Amblyrhynchus cristatus	Iguanidae	12 (26.46)	1.4 (4.59)	Galápagos Islands	
11	Rhinoceros iguana	Cyclura cornuta	Iguanidae	10 (22.05)	1.22 (4.0). Probably 1.36 (4.46)	Island of Hispaniola	
12	Green iguana	Iguana iguana	Iguanidae	9.1 (20)	2.0 (6.55)	Brazil and Paraguay as far north as Mexico	
13	Northern Sierra Madre forest monitor	Varanus bitatawa	Varanidae	9 (19.84)	1.8 (5.84)	Philippines	
14	Red tegu	Salvator rufescens	Teiidae	9 (19.84)	1.4 (4.59)	Western Argentina, Bolivia and Paraguay	
15	Gray's monitor	Varanus olivaceus	Varanidae	8.9 (19.62)	1.88 (6.16)	Southern Luzon, Catanduanes, and Polillo Island in Philippines	

== By families ==
=== Agamas (Agamidae) ===
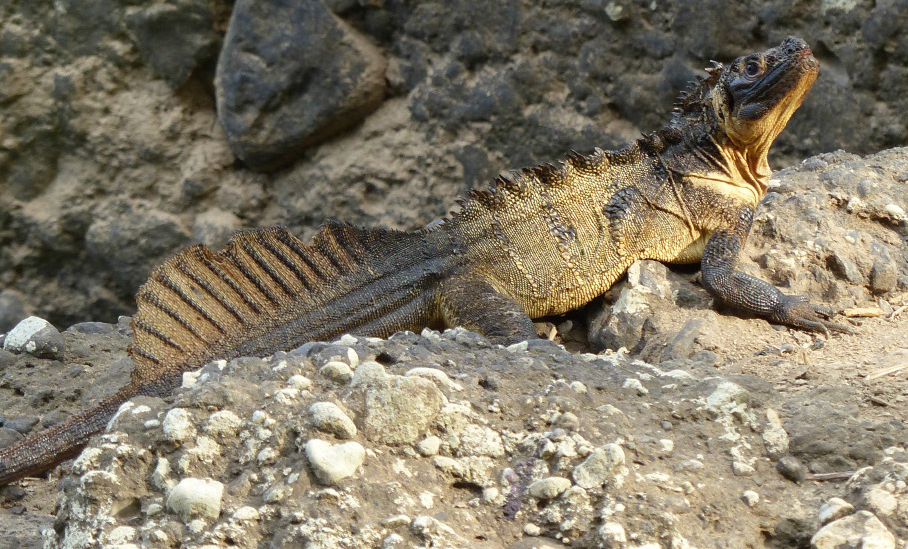
Makassar sailfin lizard is usually regarded as the largest representative of family Agamidae, reaching a length of 1.2 m (3.9 ft).

- The largest representatives in this group are species in the genus Hydrosaurus, which often exceed 1 metre (3.3 ft) in length.
  - The largest species – Makassar sailfin lizard (Hydrosaurus microlophus) and Sulawesi black sailfin lizard (Hydrosaurus celebensis) grow to a length of 1.2 (3.9 ft) and 1.13 m (3.7 ft) respectively.
  - Weber's sailfin lizard (Hydrosaurus weberi), Philippine sailfin lizard (Hydrosaurus pustulatus) and Amboina sailfin lizard (Hydrosaurus amboinensis) (previously counts the largest species in this group) have a length of 1 m (3.3 ft).
- The Australian water dragon (Intellagama lesueurii) and Chinese water dragon (Physignathus cocincinus) can also exceed this length.
- The frilled lizard (Chlamydosaurus kingii) has length up to 85 cm (2.79 ft) and mass up to 870 g (1.92 lb), probably even 900 g (2 lb)
- Uromastyx aegyptia is one of heaviest representatives among agamas, with length up to 76 cm (30 in) and mass 2 kg (4.4 lbs).
- A central bearded dragon (Pogona vitticeps) and eastern bearded dragon (Pogona barbata) have a length of 60 cm (24 in), and are the largest in their genus.

=== American legless lizards (Anniellidae) ===
- The largest American legless lizard is the Californian legless lizard (Anniella pulchra) attaining 18 cm (7.1 in) long.

=== Glass lizards (Anguidae) ===
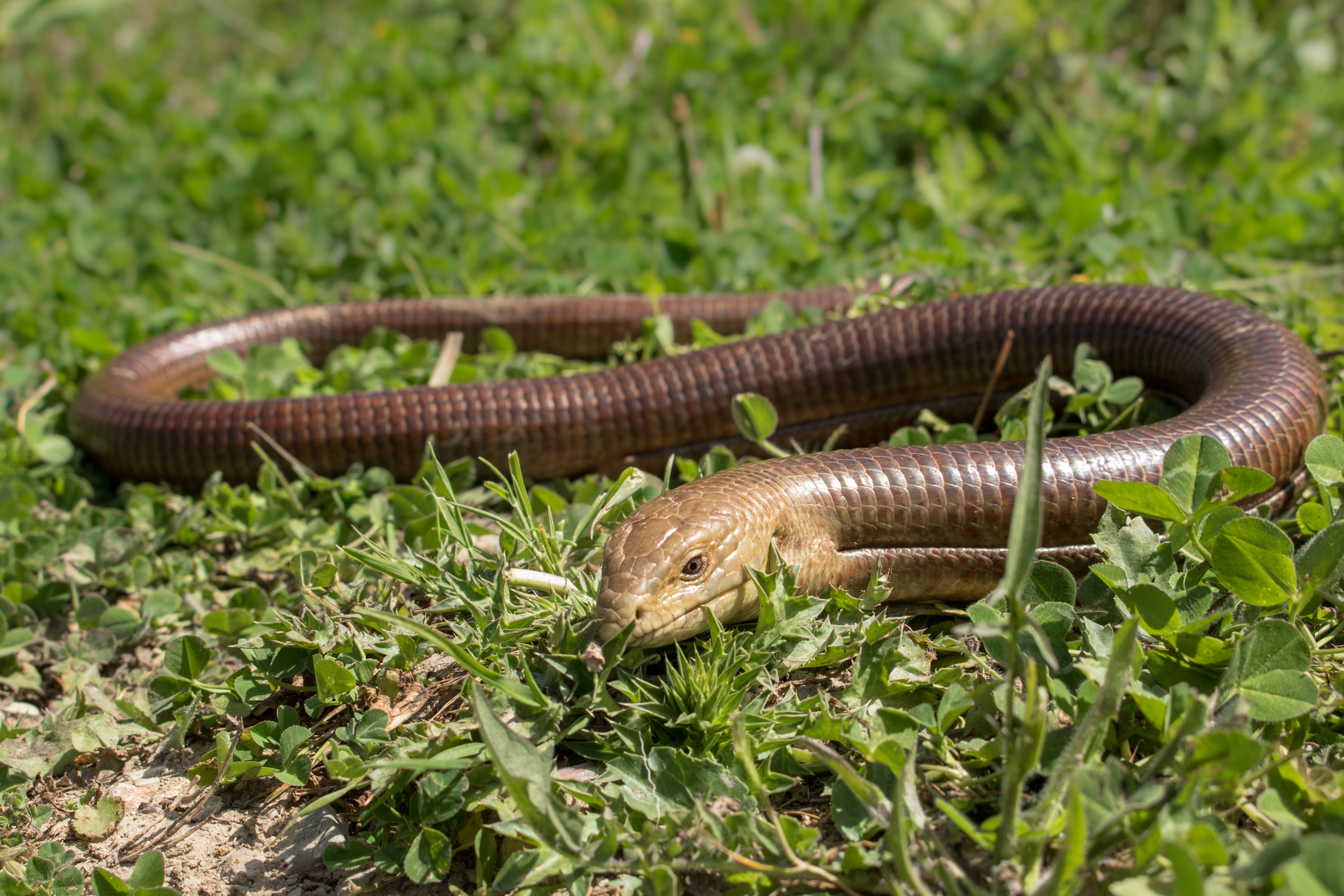
Sheltopusik from Southern Europe to Central Asia, is the largest legless lizard, reaching a length of 1.2 m (3.9 ft)

- Many representatives of this family are legless lizards. Among these the largest species, and also the largest legless lizard in the world, is the sheltopusik (Pseudopus apodus), reaching a maximum length of more 135 cm (4.43 ft) and a mass in 1.1 kg (2.4 lb).
- The eastern glass lizard (Ophisaurus ventralis) and slender glass lizard (Ophisaurus attenuatus) may reach lengths of up to 108 cm (3.54 ft) and 107 cm (3.51 ft) respectively.
- However, this family also has lizards with legs, among which the largest is the Texas alligator lizard (Gerrhonotus infernalis) growing to from 45.7 cm (18 in) till 64 cm (25.2 in) in different sources.

=== Chameleons (Chamaeleonidae) ===
- Of all chameleons, the largest is the Parson's chameleon (Calumma parsonii), reaching a length of 68 cm (27 in). But the longest species is the Malagasy giant chameleon (Furcifer oustaleti). It has a length of up to 68.5 cm (27 in).
- Other large chameleons are the veiled chameleon (Chameleo calyptratus) and Meller's chameleon (Trioceros melleri), with lengths of up to 61 cm (24 in) Exceptionally large specimens of the latter have reputedly reached over 76 cm (30 in) and mass 600 g (1.3 lb), although this is unlikely.

=== Spinytail lizards (Cordylidae) ===
- Many species in this family are small to medium-sized lizards that range in length from 6 to 30 cm (2.4 to 11.8 inches). There are large species in the genus Smaug, the largest of which is a giant girdled lizard (Smaug giganteus), with snout-vent length up to 20.5 cm (8.07 in) and total length up to roughly 40 cm (15.74 in).

=== Casquehead lizards (Corytophanidae) ===
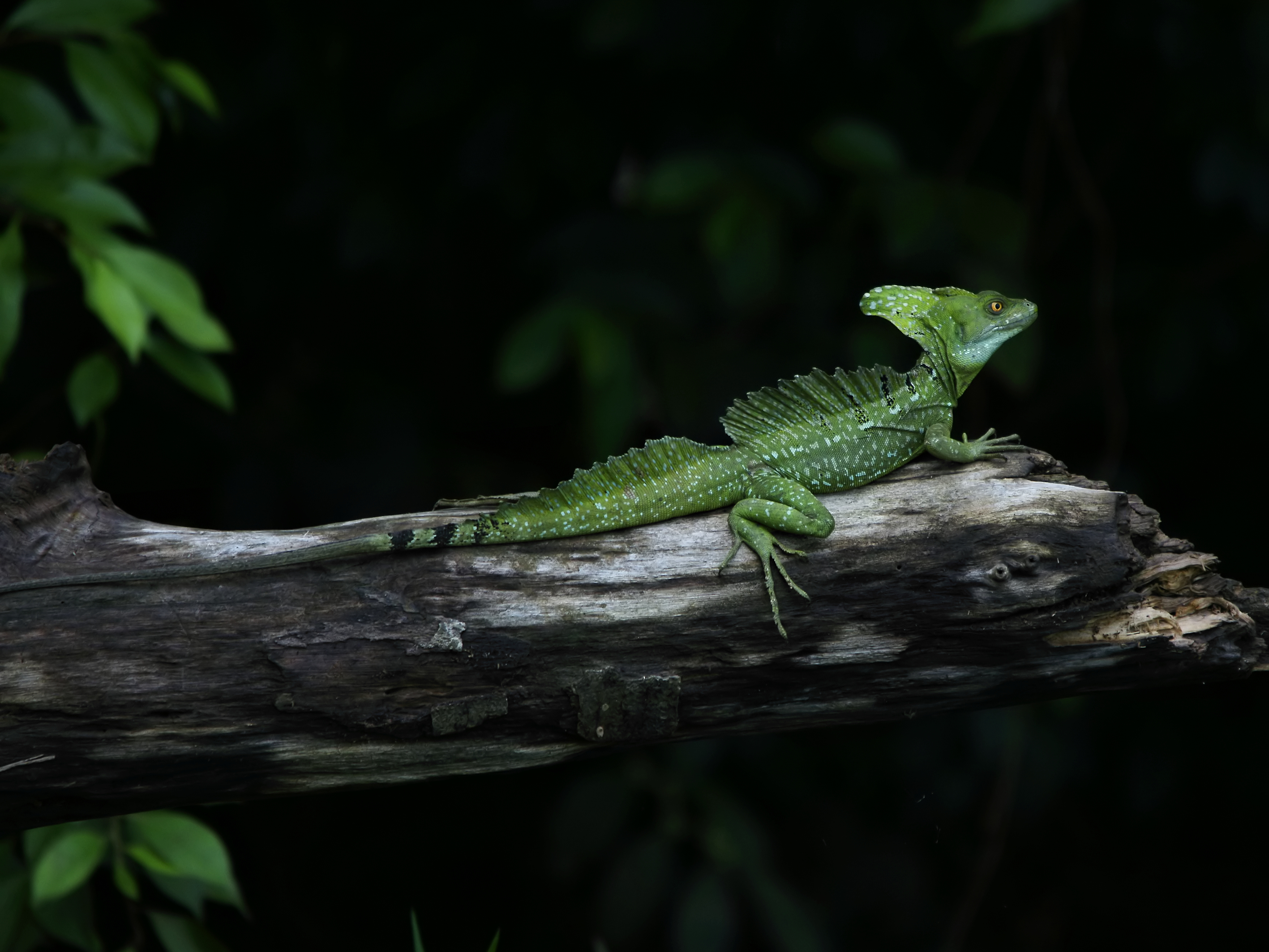
Basilisks are quite large lizards, especially the plumed basilisk

- Casquehead lizards are quite large lizards. In particular, the genus Basiliscus typically measures 70–75 cm (28–30 in). But the largest species in this group is the plumed basilisk (Basiliscus plumifrons), frequently growing to 91 cm (36 in).
- Another large species in this group is the eastern casquehead iguana (Laemanctus longipes) reaching up to 70 cm (27.6 in) including its long, thin tail.

=== Collared lizards (Crotaphytidae) ===
- In this family it is not known exactly which species is the largest, but according to current data the largest is the reticulated collared lizard (Crotaphytus reticulatus) with length up to 41 cm (16 in) and mass 78.77 g (2.8 oz).

=== Anoles (Dactyloidae) ===
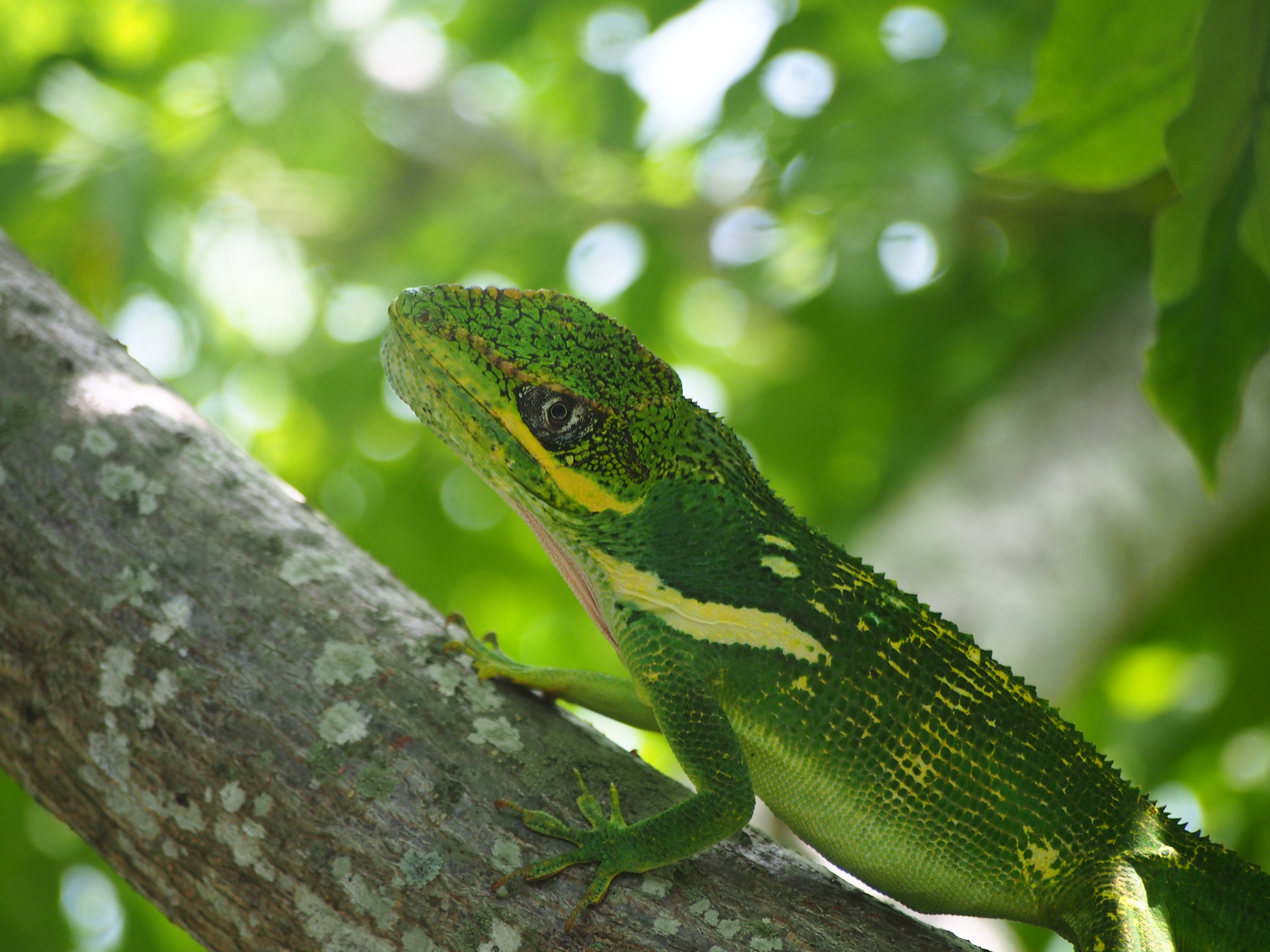
The knight anole is the largest anole, over half a meter in length

- Large species in this group are usually crown giant anolis ecomorphs The species generally considered the largest is the knight anole (Anolis equestris), which can reach up to 51 cm (20 in) in total length, 19 cm (7.5 in) in snout-vent length and weigh 137 g (4.83 oz).
- However, in the equester species complex there are also species reaching the same length and even larger. These include A. baracoae, A. luteogularis, A. noblei and A. smallwoodi.

=== Geckos (Gekkota) ===
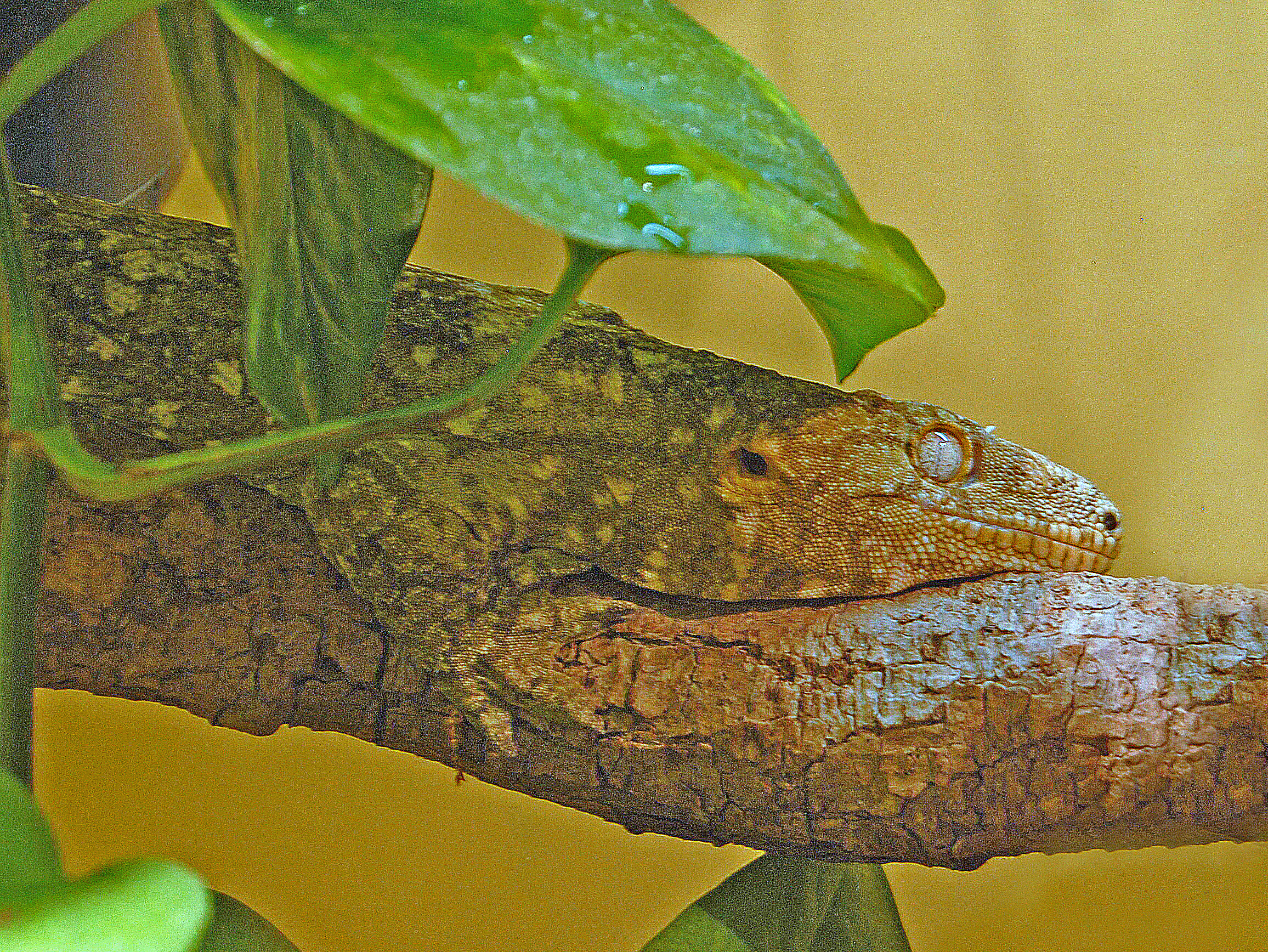
The New Caledonian giant gecko is the largest gecko, weighing up to almost 300 g (10.5 oz)

- Species of geckos belong to different groups. For example, many species of geckos are in family Gekkonidae, but there are very large species in the family Diplodactylidae. For example, to them belongs the largest gecko species New Caledonian giant gecko (Rhacodactylus leachianus), which can be 36–43.18 cm (14–17 in) long and mass 212–279 g (7.5–9.8 oz)
- Other representatives of the same genus as the aforementioned gecko can also reach huge sizes. These include gargoyle gecko (Rhacodactylus auriculatus), greater rough-snouted giant gecko (R. trachyrhynchus) and lesser rough-snouted giant gecko (R. trachycephalus). As well as former species in this genus: crested gecko (Correlophus ciliatus), Sarasins' giant gecko (C. sarasinorum) and Bavay's giant gecko (Mniarogekko chahoua).
- An extant member of the genus Hoplodactylus, Duvaucel's gecko (Hoplodactylus duvaucelii), in which be present a largest gecko ever lived (see the largest extinct lizards) can also reach large sizes. It can reach total length 30 cm (12 in) with a snout-vent length (SVL) up to 16 cm (6.3 in), and weigh up to 120 grams (4.2 oz).
- There are also large species in the family Gekkonidae. These include tokay gecko (Gekko gekko), Smith's green-eyed gecko (G. smithii) and Andaman giant gecko (G. verreauxi), which can reach and even exceed 30 cm (12 in).
- Another genus with large geckos is Uroplatus. The largest representative in this genus is the giant leaf-tail gecko (Uroplatus giganteus), which can reach a snout–vent length of 20 cm and a total length of 32.2 cm. Another species that grows almost as large is the common flat-tail gecko (U. fimbriatus), which can exceed 30 cm (12 in) and more.
- The genus Phelsuma in subfamily Uroplatinae also has large species. Standing's day gecko (Phelsuma standingi) is one of the largest day geckos, reaching a length of about 25.4 cm (10.0 in) and Round Island day gecko (P. guentheri), Madagascar giant day gecko (P. grandis) and P. madagascariensis can reach even more impressive lengths of 30 cm (12 in) or more.
- Outside of the families Diplodactylidae and Gekkonidae, there are large geckoes among the Eublepharidae. The African fat-tailed gecko (Hemitheconyx caudicinctus) reaches a length of up to 23 cm (9.1 in), and a mass of 75 g (2.6 oz). The leopard gecko (Euplepharis macularis) reaches even large sizes – up to 28 cm (11 in) long with a mass of 60–80 g (2.1–2.84 oz).
- The largest species of family Phyllodactylidae, the giant wall gecko (Tarentola gigas), reaches 30 cm (12 in) in length and 15.5 cm (6.1 in) in SVL.

=== Plated lizards (Gerrhosauridae) ===
- The largest species in this family is the giant plated lizard (Matobosaurus validus), with a total length of up to 69 cm (27 in) or even 75 cm (29.5 in), with a snout-vent length (SVL) of 28 cm (11 in). Another large plated lizard is the Sudan plated lizard (Broadleysaurus major), with a length of about 51–60 cm (20–24 in).

=== Beaded lizards and Gila monster (Helodermatidae) ===
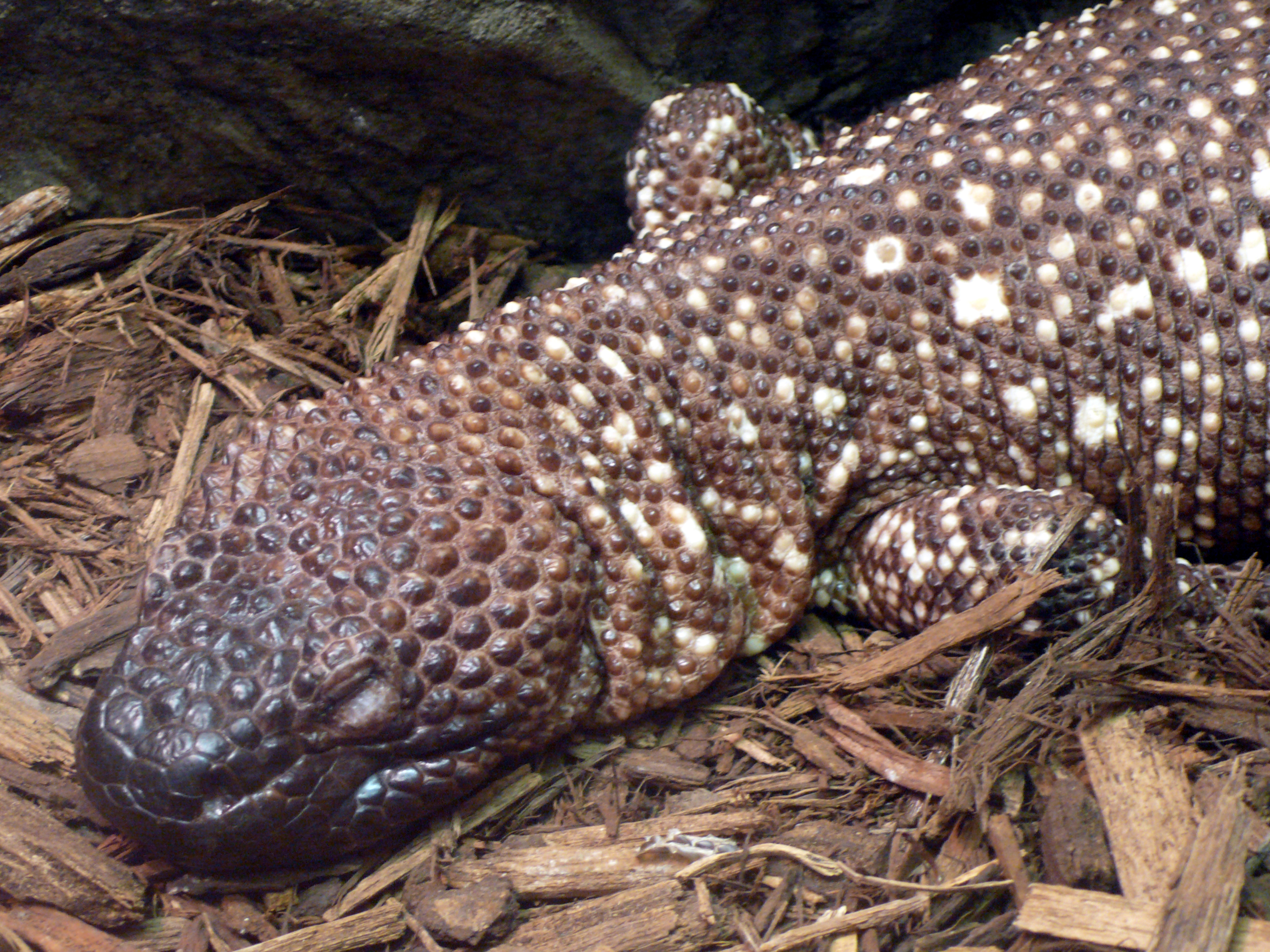
The Mexican beaded lizard is the largest species in family Helodermatidae, reaching a length of up to 91 cm (36 in)

- This family includes large and stocky lizards, including the infamous Gila monster (Heloderma suspectum), which reaches a total length up to 60 cm (23.6 in) with a snout-vent length (SVL) of 36 cm (14.1 in) and a body mass from 1 kg (2.2 lb) to 2.2 kg (4.9 lb) depending on the source. But despite the stocky and massive body of this lizard, it is not the largest representative of the family. Greatly exceeding it in size are the Mexican beaded lizard (Heloderma horridum) and Rio Fuerte beaded lizard (Heloderma exasperatum), with a total length of up to 91 cm (36 in), a SVL of up to 47 cm (18.5 in) and a mass from 2 kg (4.4 lb) to 4 kg (8.8 lb) depending on the source.

=== Iguanas (Iguanidae) ===
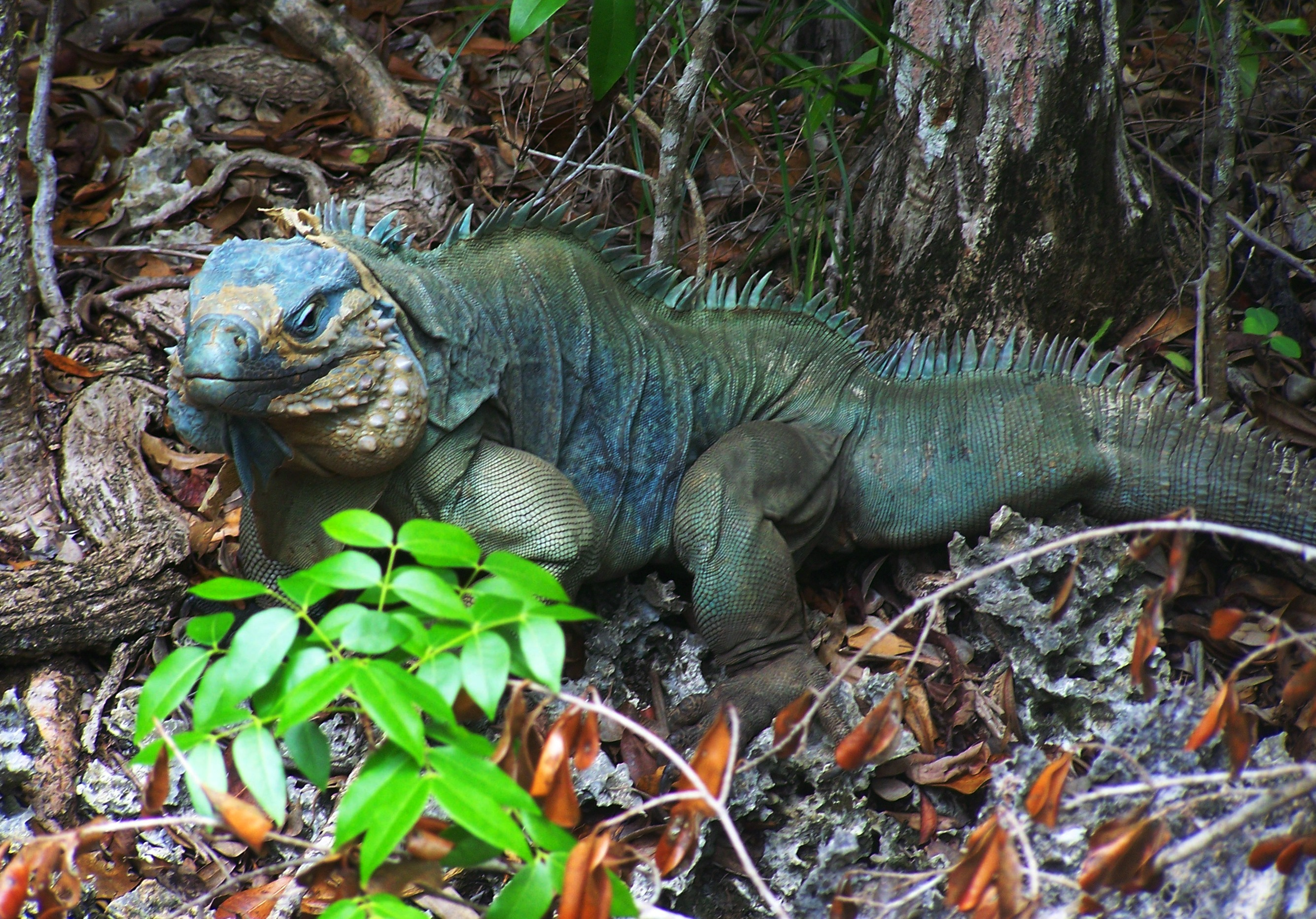
The blue iguana is the heaviest iguanid and one of the largest extant lizards

- Iguanas are very large lizards, some of which can reach lengths of up to 2 m (6.6 ft) and mass more than 10 kg (22 lb). They are the largest lizards after some large species of monitor lizards, and the largest lizards in the New World. Iguanas vary considerably in size and form, but even the smallest lizards in this family are still quite large. For example, the desert iguana (Dipsosaurus dorsalis) can reach a length of up to 61 cm (24 in). The largest species of the genus Sauromalus is the San Esteban chuckwalla (Sauromalus varius), up to 76 cm (27 in) long and 1.4 kg (3.1 lb) in weight, while the second-largest is the Angel Island chuckwalla (S. hispidus), up to 64 cm (25.2 in) long.
- Many sources describe the green iguana (Iguana iguana) as the largest iguanid, often reaching lengths up to 1.5 metres (4.91 ft) and masses of 4 kg (8.8 lb), and with a maximum length of 2 m (6.6 ft) and a mass of 8 kg (18 lb) and in some cases even 9.1 kg (20 lb). However, the heaviest species in this family is the blue iguana (Cyclura lewisi), with a total length of up to 1.5 m (4.91 ft), a SVL of 51–76 cm (30 in) and a mass of up to 14 kg (31 lb) It is the eighth-heaviest and largest extant lizard.

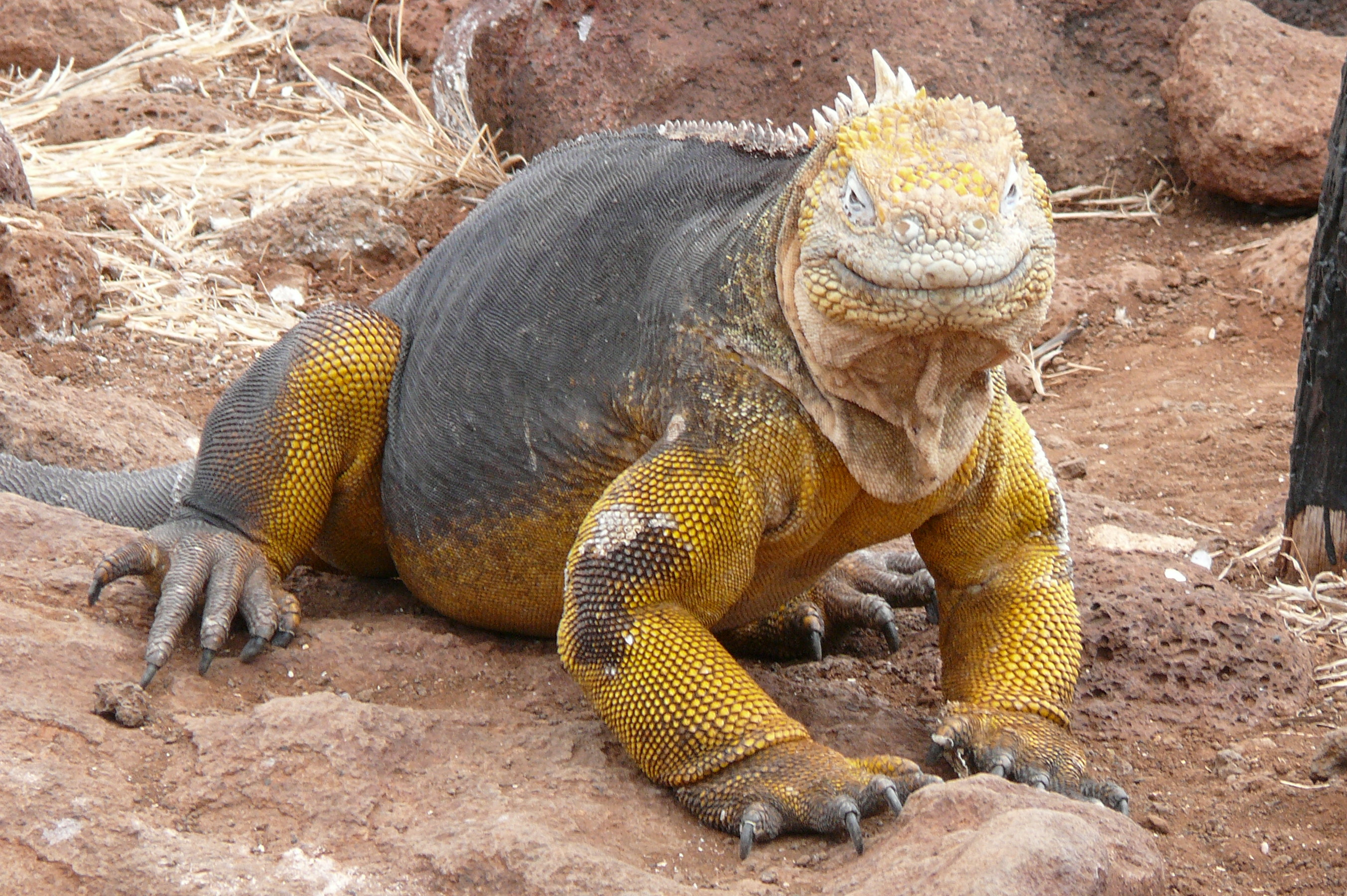
The Galapagos land iguana is a very massive lizard weighing more than 10 kg (22 lb) and is one of the largest extant lizards

- Other large species in this family include the Galapagos land iguana (Conolophus subcristataus), with a length of about 1.5 m (4.91 ft) and a mass of up to 13 kg (29 lb). It is the second-heaviest iguanid after the blue iguana and the ninth-heaviest and largest lizard in the world. Another large species from the same genus is the Santa Fe land iguana (C. pallidus), reaching a SVL of 56.4 cm (22.2 in) and a mass of 7.2 kg (16 lb). The Galapagos pink land iguana (C. marthae) have snout-vent length 57.5 cm (22.6 in) and the mass of 8 kg (18 lb).
- The marine iguana (Amblyrhynchus cristatus) is the tenth-largest extant lizard in the world, and the largest reptile on Galapagos Islands after the Galapagos land iguana, not including turtles reaching a maximum total length of 1.4 m (4.59 ft), a SVL of from 12 till 56 cm (from 4.72 till 22 in) and a mass of from 1 to 12 kg (2.2 to 26.5 lb) depending on islands.
- Aforementioned genus Cyclura includes other very large iguanas, such as Anegada rock iguana (Cyclura pinguis) reaching a snout-vent length (SVL) of 56 cm (22 in) and a mass 7.75 kg (17.1 lb). A second largest species in this genus and second longest iguanid overall, and also one of the largest lizards in the Caribbean, the Cuban iguana (C. nubila) reaching a length in 1.6 m (5.2 ft) with a SVL in 74.5 cm (29.3 in).
- The rhinoceros iguana (Cyclura cornuta) has a length in 1.36 m (4.5 ft), with a SVL 56 cm (22 in) and a mass more 4.56–9 kg (10.1–19.8 lb). Previously considered a subspecies of the aforementioned rhinoceros iguana, the Mona ground iguana (C. strejnegeri) exceeds a total length of 1.22 m (4 ft), SVL of 53.5 cm (21.1 in), mass of 6.4 kg (14 lb) and is the largest native terrestrial lizard in Puerto-Rico.
- At least two subspecies (Cyclura cychlura cychlura and Cyclura cychlura inornata) of the Northern Bahamian rock iguana (Cyclura cychlura) can be over 1.5 m (4.9 ft) in length.
- A member of the genus Iguana, lesser Antillean iguana (Iguana delicatissima) can reach SVL 43.4 cm (17.1 in), and mass 3.5 kg (7.7 lb).
- The black iguana (Ctenosaura similis) and western spiny-tailed iguana (C. pectinata) are the largest species in the genus Ctenosaura, reaching a length in 1.3 m (4.3 ft). The longest is Mexican spiny-tailed iguana (C. acanthura) with a length of 1.4 m (4.6 ft).

=== True lizards (Lacertidae) ===
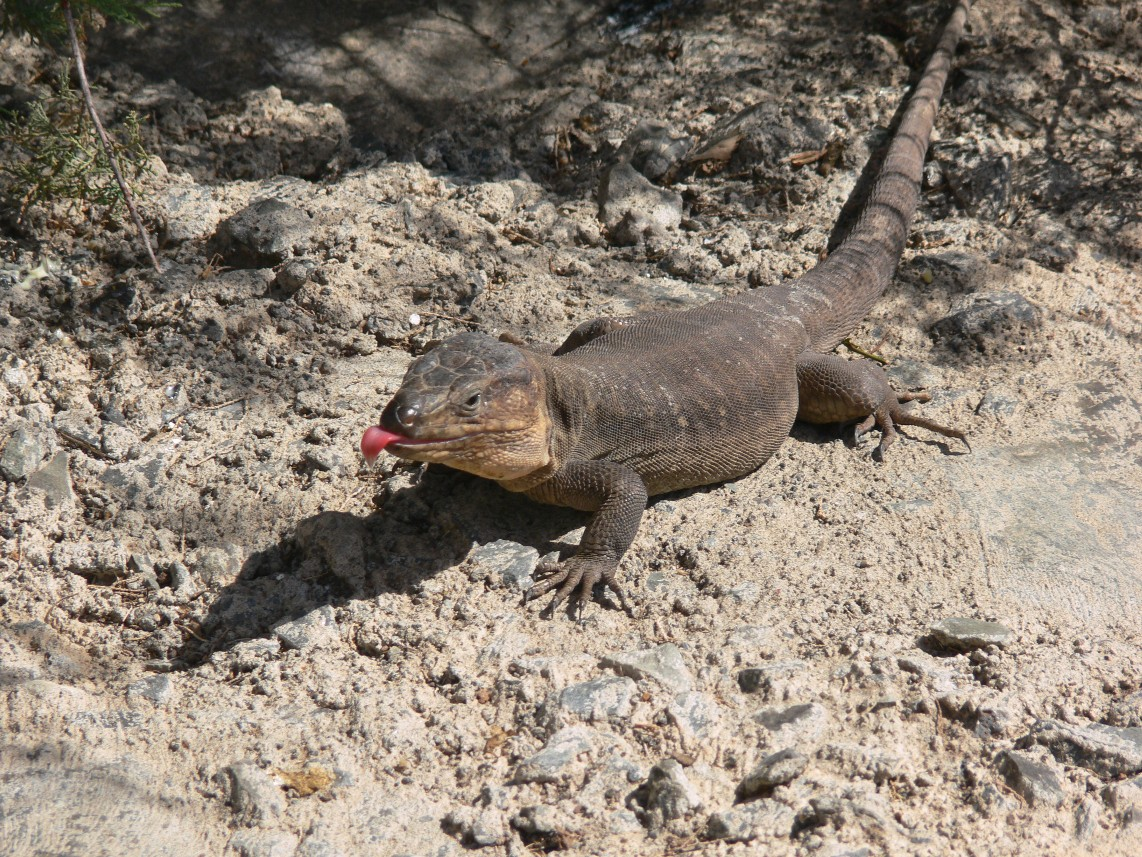
Gran Canaria giant lizard is the largest member of a family Lacertidae, exceeding a length of 80 cm (31 in)

- This family includes 300 diverse species. Among the largest is Gran Canaria giant lizard (Gallotia stehlini), reaching a length of 80 cm (31 in), with a SVL of 26.5 cm (10.4 in) and a mass of almost 1.7 kg (3.7 lb). A subspecies in the same genus – El Hierro giant lizard (G. simonyi machadoi), perhaps also is one of the largest lacertids, and able reach a length of 60 cm (24 in). A Tenerife lizard (G. galloti) have a total length in 44 cm (17 in) and a SVL of 14.5 cm (5.7 in). Another large lizard in this genus are La Gomera giant lizard (G. brovoana), reaching a length of almost 50 cm (20 in) and a SVL in 19 cm (7.5 in)
- Estimated to reach snout-vent length of 40–44 cm (16–17 in) and a mass of 5 kg (11 lb), La Palma giant lizard (Gallotia auaritae) is perhaps the largest living lacertid, outsizing even Gran Canaria giant lizard (G. stehlini). However, on the other hand, there is very little data to confirm this, and therefore the aforementioned Gran Canaria giant lizard is usually considered the largest representative of its family.
- The longest member of this family is ocellated lizard (Timon lepidus), having a length of 90 cm (35 in), with a SVL 26 cm (10 in) and a mass 0.5 kg (18 oz). A representative of the same genus, the Moroccan eyed lizard (T. tangitanus) can have a length of 70 cm (28 in), and is one of the longest members of this family.
- The European green lizard (Lacerta viridis), Iberian emerald lizard (L. schreiberi) and western green lizard (L. bilineata) can exceed a length 40 cm (16 in) and more, and with a SVL at least 13 cm (5.1 in). The largest species in this group is Balkan green lizard (L. trilineata), reaching a length of 50 cm (20 in), and a SVL of 16 cm (6.3 in).

=== Earless monitor lizards (Lanthanotidae) ===
- The only living species in this family – earless monitor lizard (Lanthanotus borneensis) typically has a snout-vent length (SVL) of about 20 cm (8 in), and a total length of about 40 cm (16 in). The longest recorded in the wild had length in 44.1 cm (17.4 in). A specimen collected in the 1960s had a total length of 51 cm (20 in), and near the time of its death an individual kept at the Bronx Zoo from 1968 to 1976 had a total length of 47 cm (18.5 in) and weighed 209 g (7.4 oz), but it was highly obese.

=== Curly-tailed lizards (Leiocephalidae) ===
- The largest curly tailed lizard is Leiocephalus carinatus. Adults may attain a snout to vent length (SVL) of 10.5 cm (4.1 in), or a total length, including the tail, of 26 cm (10 in). The dorsal scales are keeled and pointed. Leicoephalus carinatus resembles lizards of the genus Sceloporus, but with the tail usually curled upward, especially when the lizard is in a horizontal position on rocks or on the ground.

=== Leiosaurids (Leiosauridae) ===
- Enyalius catenatus can have a body mass of up to 38.66 g (1.364 oz).

=== Liolaemids (Liolaemidae) ===
- Members of the genus Liolaemus are vary considerably in size (45–100 millimetres or 1.8–3.9 inches snout–vent length) and weight (3–200 grams or 0.1–7.1 ounces). The largest species are L. chlorostictus (85 mm max. SVL), L. dorbignyi (98.3 mm max. SVL), L. duellmani (83 mm max. SVL), L. forsteri (93 mm max. SVL), L. foxi (82.9 mm max. SVL), L. huayra (94.3 mm max. SVL), L. inti (90.4 mm max. SVL), L. jamesi (97.5 mm max. SVL), L. melanogaster (91 mm max. SVL), L. nigriceps (88.8 mm max. SVL), L. orientalis (99.2 mm max. SVL), L. patriciaiturrae (96.5 mm max. SVL), L. puritamensis (90.8 mm max. SVL), L. robertoi (84 mm max. SVL), L. scrocchii (95 mm max. SVL) and L. stolzmanni (92 mm max. SVL). The species L. fabiani, L. filiorum, L. pachecoi, L. pleopholis, L. polystictus, L. robustus, L. thomasi, L. vallecurensis, L. vulcanus, and L. williamsi, L. austromendocinus, L. elongatus, L. gununakuna, L. petrophilus, and L. thermarum also may reach large sizes (around 10 cm)

=== Madagascan iguanas (Opluridae) ===
- The biggest species of Madagascan iguana is Madagascar spotted spiny-tailed iguana (Oplurus quadrimaculatus), it can reach a length of 25–39 centimetres (9.8–15.4 in).

=== Legless lizards (Pygopodidae) ===
- The largest legless lizard in this family is the common scaly-foot (Pygopus lepidopodus) with a length of 70 cm (28 in), a SVL of 24 cm (9.4 in) with a weight of 225.95 g (7.970 oz). It is also the largest legless lizard in Australia and biggest in the world overall, if not counting some members of the family Anguidae.
- Another large member is Burton's legless lizard (Lialis burtonis) with a maximum length of 60 cm (23.6 in), according to some information even 1.02 m (3.3 ft) and a body length (snout-vent length) of 29 cm (11 in).

=== Skinks (Scincidae) ===
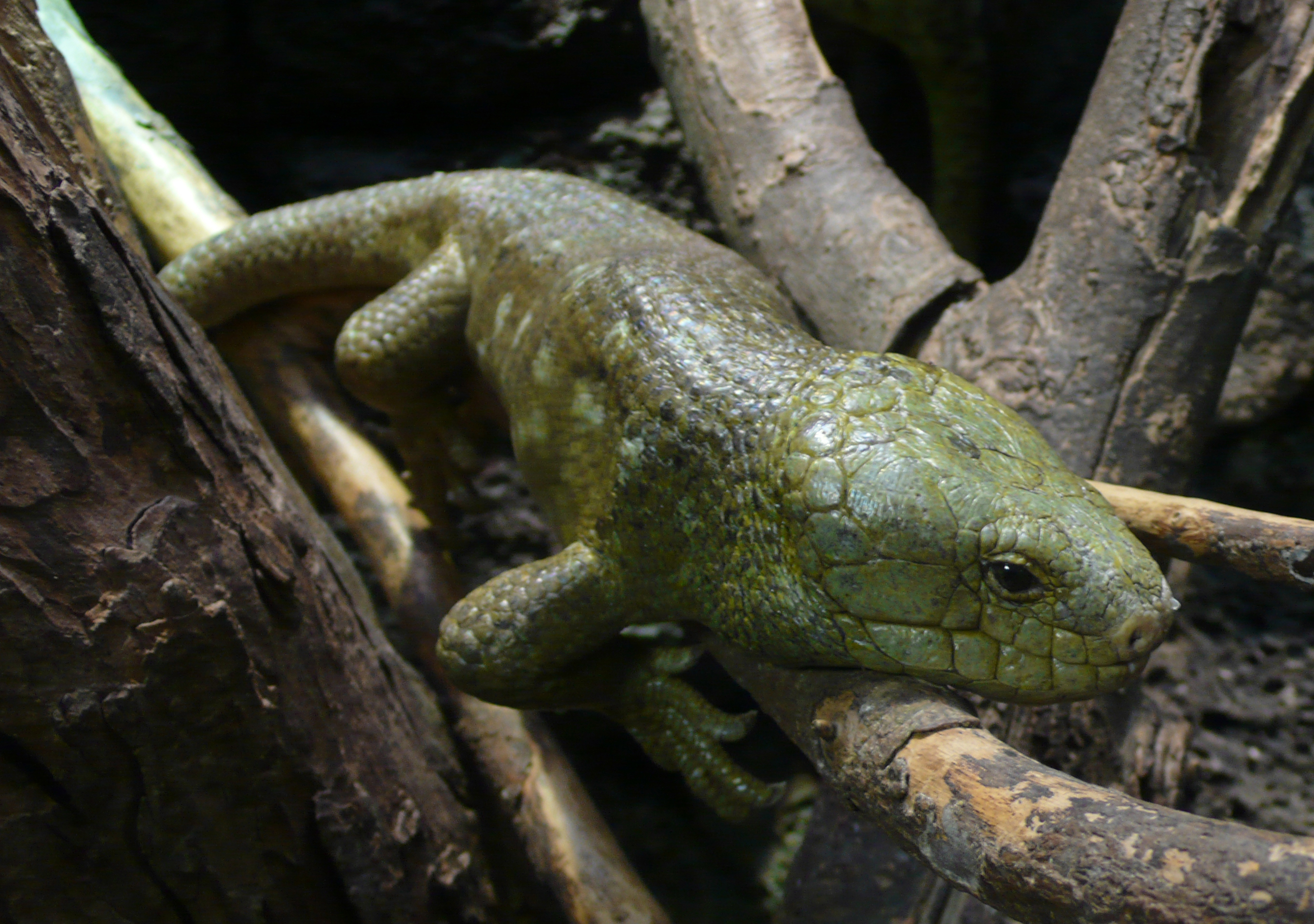
The Solomon Islands skink – largest skink reaching the length of 81 cm (32 in)

- In this family of about 1500 species, many skinks have a snout-vent length (SVL) of 12 cm (4.7 in). The largest member of this family, the Solomon Islands skink (Corucia zebrata), can grow to a length of 81 cm (32 in), a SVL of 35 cm (13.8 in) and a mass of 0.8–0.9 kg (1.8–2.0 lb). The heaviest is the common blue-tongued skink (Tiliqua scincoides), reaching a length of 60 cm (24 in), a SVL of 36 cm (14.1 in) and a mass of 1 kg (2.2 lb).
- The genus Tiliqua also has large species of skinks. One of them is the subspecies Indonesian blue-tongued skink (Tiliqua gigas) – Merauke blue-tongued skink (T. gigas evanescens) growing a length of 66–76 cm (26–30 in), thus not only being the longest species in the genus Tiliqua, but also the second by length in family Scincidae after Solomon Islands skink. Large sizes may also be reached by blotched blue-tongued lizard (T. nigrolutea) with a length of 35–50 cm (14–20 in), according to some information even 59.6 cm (23.5 in), a SVL of 32 cm (13 in) and a mass of 0.8 kg (1.8 lb), Centralian blue-tongued skink (T. multifasciata) exceeding in length of 45 cm (18 in) with a SVL of 28.9 cm (11.4 in), western blue-tongued lizard (T. occipitalis) with a length of 50 cm (20 in) and a SVL of 30.7 cm (12.1 in), probably 32 cm (13 in), shingleback lizard (T. rugosa) with a total length of 41 cm (16 in), a SVL of 26–31 cm (10–12 in) and a mass of 0.6 to 0.9 kg (1.3 to 2.0 lb) and an Irian Jaya blue tongue skink (Tiliqua sp.) with total length of 38–76 cm (15–30 in).
- Previously in the genus Tiliqua is the pink-tongued skink (Cyclodomorphus gerrardii), with a length of 45 cm (18 in) and a SVL of 20 cm (7.9 in).
- The land mullet (Bellatorias major) is one of the largest skinks and can reach a SVL of 16–31 cm (6.3–12.2 in) with a total length of 60 cm (24 in). A representative of the same genus – the major skink (B. frerei) also grows to large sizes – a total length of 42 cm (17 in) with a SVL of 18 cm (7.1 in)
- The King's skink (Egernia kingii) is one of the longest skinks and can exceed a length of 55 cm (22 in) with a SVL of 24.4 cm (9.6 in) and weighing 220 g (7.8 oz). Other large skinks are Cunningham's spiny-tailed skink (E. cunninghami) and yakka skink (E. rugosa), both of which reach a length of 40 cm (16 in).
- A representative of the genus Eumeces is Schneider's skink (Eumeces schneiderii) has a length of 36.5 cm (14.4 in) with a SVL in 16.5 cm (6.5 in). Previously in the aforementioned genus – Kishinoue's giant skink (Plestiodon kishinouyei) is the largest species in its genus and may grows a length of 30–40 cm (12–16 in) with a SVL of 14.0–17.2 cm (5.5–6.8 in). Other large members in the genus Plestiodon are a broad-headed skink (P. laticeps) and a Great Plains skink (P. obsoletus) with a maximum length of 32.4 cm (12.8 in) and 34.9 cm (13.7 in) and a SVL 14.3 cm (5.6 in) and 14 cm (5.5 in) respectively.
- The genus Chalcides includes many legless or almost legless skinks. The largest among these are the Italian three-toed skink (Chalcides chalcides) and the western three-toed skink (C. striatus) which have a length of 48 cm (19 in) and 43 cm (17 in) respectively. In the genus Acontias also are limbless skinks many of which are quite small lizards, but the largest among these is giant legless skink (Acontias plumbeus) at approximately reaching 40 cm (16 in) in length.
- The fire skink (Mochlus fernandi) is the largest member in its genus and also one of the largest African skinks, growing to a length of 37 cm (15 in) and a SVL of 17 cm (6.7 in)
- Telfair's skink (Leiolopisma telfairii), the largest living skink in Mauritius, attains a size over 16 cm (6.3 in) in SVL and may grows 30–40 cm (12–16 in) in length with a maximum length of 45 cm (18 in) and a mass in 240 g (8.5 oz). Its extinct relative is Mauritian giant skink (L. mauritiana), which in twice excelled to length of its contemporary (see the largest extinct lizards) and was the biggest known skink of all time.
- The terror skink (Phoboscincus bocourti) is an endangered skink and may reach 50 cm (20 in) in length and 28 cm (11 in) in SVL thus not only being one of the largest extant skinks, but the second biggest reptile on its island after monitor lizards, and so is an apex predator in its territory.

=== Tegus and Teiids (Teiidae) ===
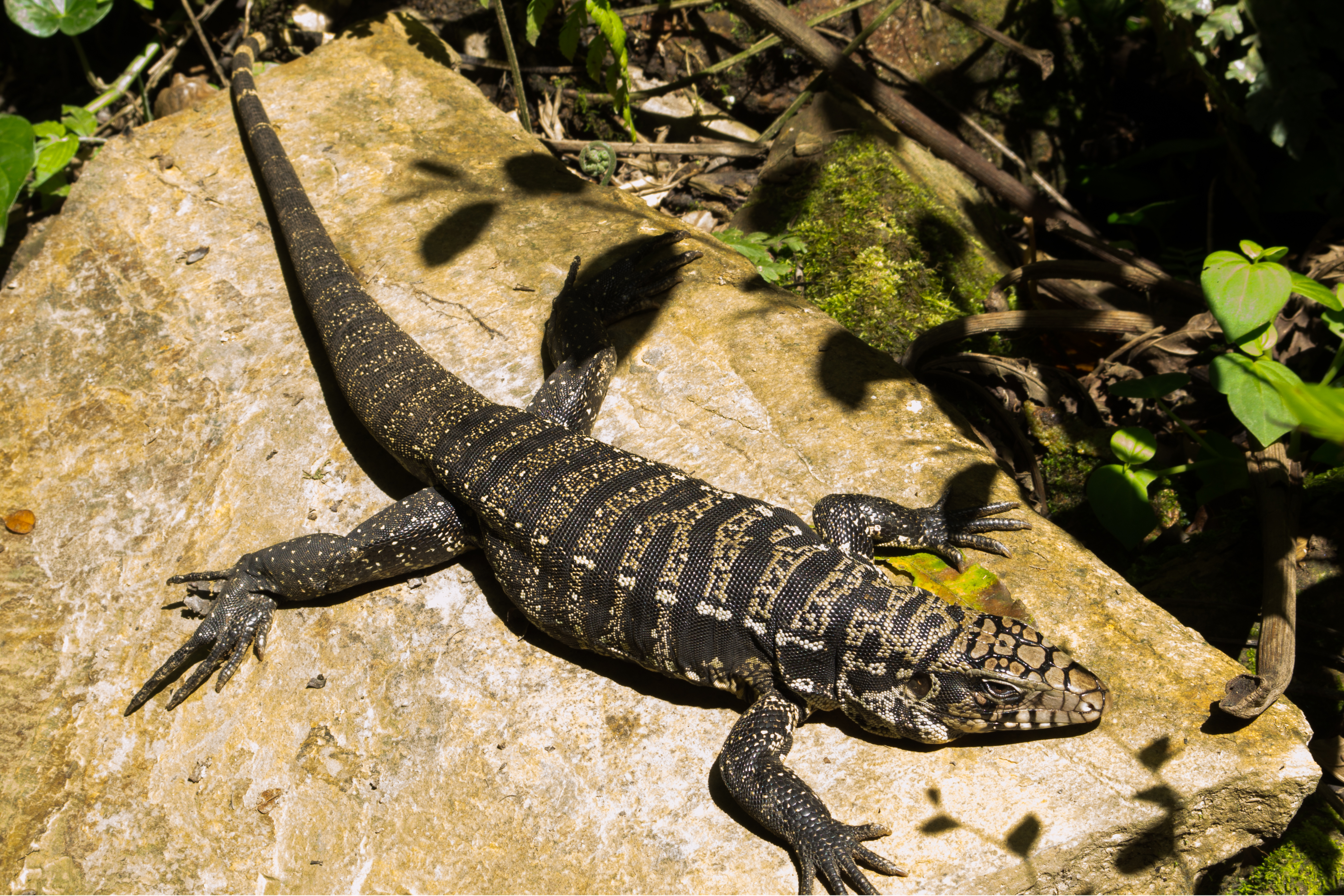
Argentine black and white tegu is the largest teiid and one of the heaviest lizards in the world, reaching a mass of 7 kg (15 lb)

- Many teiids are quite small lizards, although some members such as tegus are among the biggest lizards in the world after monitor lizards and iguanas. The largest species are Argentine black and white tegu (Salvator merianae) and red tegu (Salvator rufescens), which attain more than 1.2 m (3.9 ft) in length and 6.8 kg (15 lb) in mass. Argentine black and white tegu is usually considered the largest species in its family with a length of 1.5 m (4.91 ft) and a mass of 7 kg (15 lb). Although, however, the red tegu, being more massive and bulky, can weigh more – the length is about 1.4 m (4.6 ft), and the weight is 9 kg (20 lb).
- Both species of genus Dracaena, the northern caiman lizard (Dracaena guianensis) and the Paraguay caiman lizard (Dracaena paraguayensis), can have a length of 1.2 m (3.9 ft) and a mass in 4.5 kg (9.9 lb).
- The largest member of the genus Tupinambis is the gold tegu (Tupinambis teguixin) with a maximum SVL in 40 cm (16 in). Other large teiids in this group are the cryptic golden tegu (Tupinambis cryptus) (maximum size: 391 mm (15.4 in) SVL with a 530 mm (21 in) tail), the Cusco tegu (Tupinambis cuzcoensis) (SVL of 247 mm (9.7 in) or larger) and the Maracaibo Basin tegu (Tupinambis zuliensis) (a 273 mm (10.7 in) SVL with a 537 mm (21.1 in) tail).

=== Monitor lizards (Varanidae) ===
Body size in monitor lizards shows greater variation than in any other family of animals with adult animals weighing between 23 g (0.81 oz) and 80,000 g (176.3 lb). The family includes both the largest extant lizards and the largest terrestrial lizards that have ever existed, yet about a third of the living species are dwarfs that seldom exceed 500 g (18 oz) in weight. Such massive size disparity between species makes the group ideal model animals to study the effects of gigantism on ecology and physiology, but at present little of their potential in this field has been explored. Although, species weighing around 1 kg (2.2 lb) are often found. This family includes the Komodo dragon, which is the largest of all extant lizards, with a length of 3 meters (10 ft) and approximate weight of 113 kg (249 lb). Some of the largest representatives of the Varanidae such as the Komodo dragon, crocodile monitor, and the extinct megalania can count as apex predators. In the list of the largest lizards, monitors occupy the first seven places.

Komodo dragon (Varanus komodoensis)

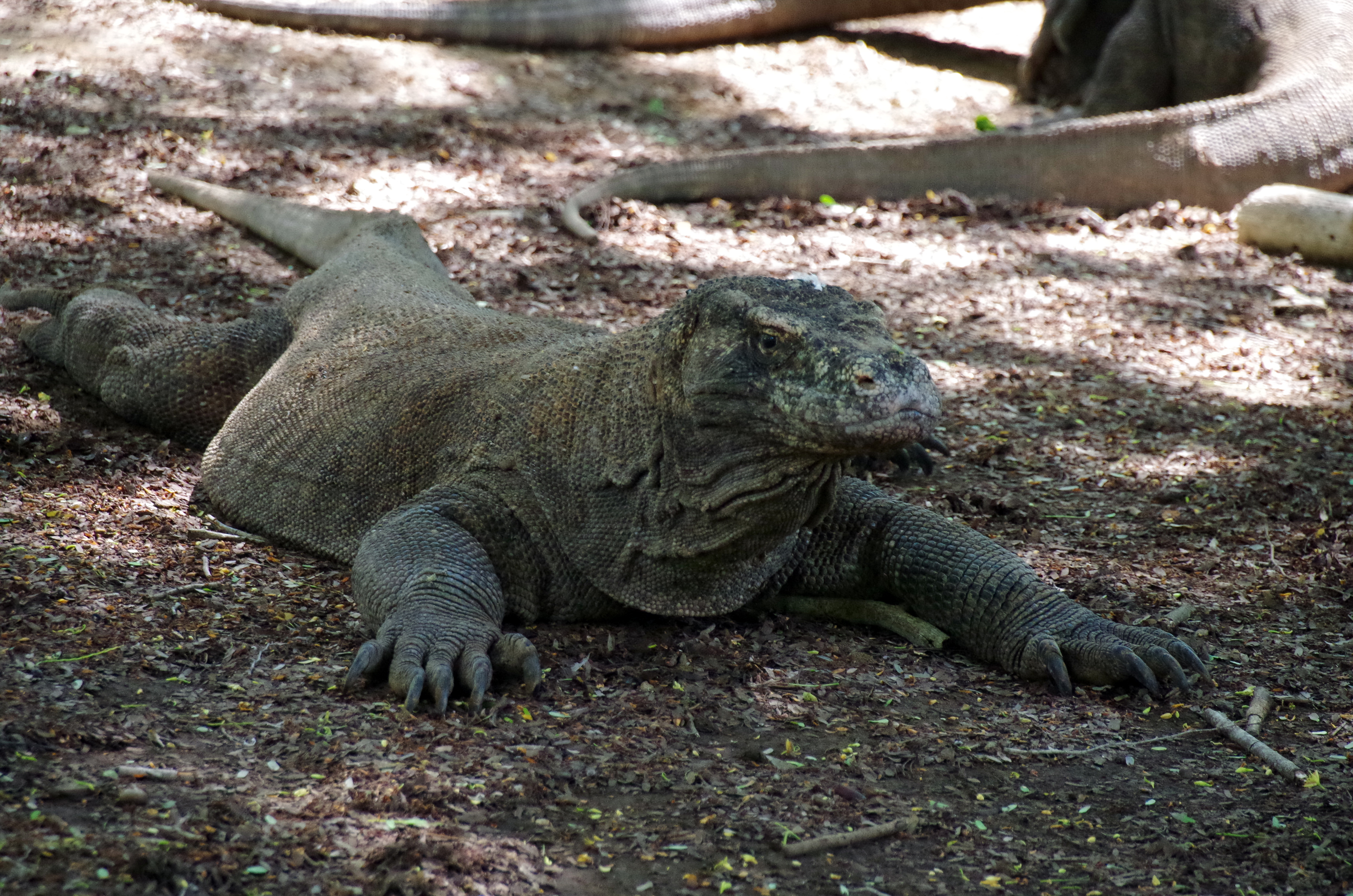
The Komodo dragon is the largest extant lizard with a maximum known mass of more 80 kg (176.3 lb), also perhaps the heaviest squamate

- The Komodo dragon (Varanus komodoensis) is the largest living lizard in the world, with an average weight of 70 kg (150 lb) and 25 kg (55 lb) for males and females respectively. The largest males from Komodo, may reach more 80 kg (176.3 lb). The largest specimen of Komodo dragon, a large male from Loh Liang National Park with length of 3.04 m (10.0 ft), a SVL of 1.54 m (5.1 ft) and a mass in 81.5 kg (178.5 lb). As stated above, females are generally much smaller than males. The largest female weighed about 42 kg (93 lb). The heaviest specimen in the wild weighed about 87.4 kg (193 lb). The study noted that weights greater than 100 kg (220 lb) were possible but only after the animal had consumed a large meal. The largest accurately measured individual according to Gerard Wood for Guinness World Records was a specimen put on display at the Saint Louis Zoological Park, Missouri in 1937. This individual reportedly measured 3.13 m (10.27 ft) and weighed 166 kg (366 lb), although a large portion of this was likely undigested food. Because Komodo dragons can eat up to 60% their own body weight, this weight record is considered invalid. Excluding this specimen, the Komodo dragon's maximum size is surpassed by large snakes like the green anaconda (up to 97.5 kg (215 lb) in the wild) and the reticulated python (up to 150 kg (330 lb) in captivity), but considering that these exceptionally large specimens are reported at a much lower frequency, it is still arguable that the Komodo dragon is the largest extant squamate on Earth.

Asian water monitor (Varanus salvator)

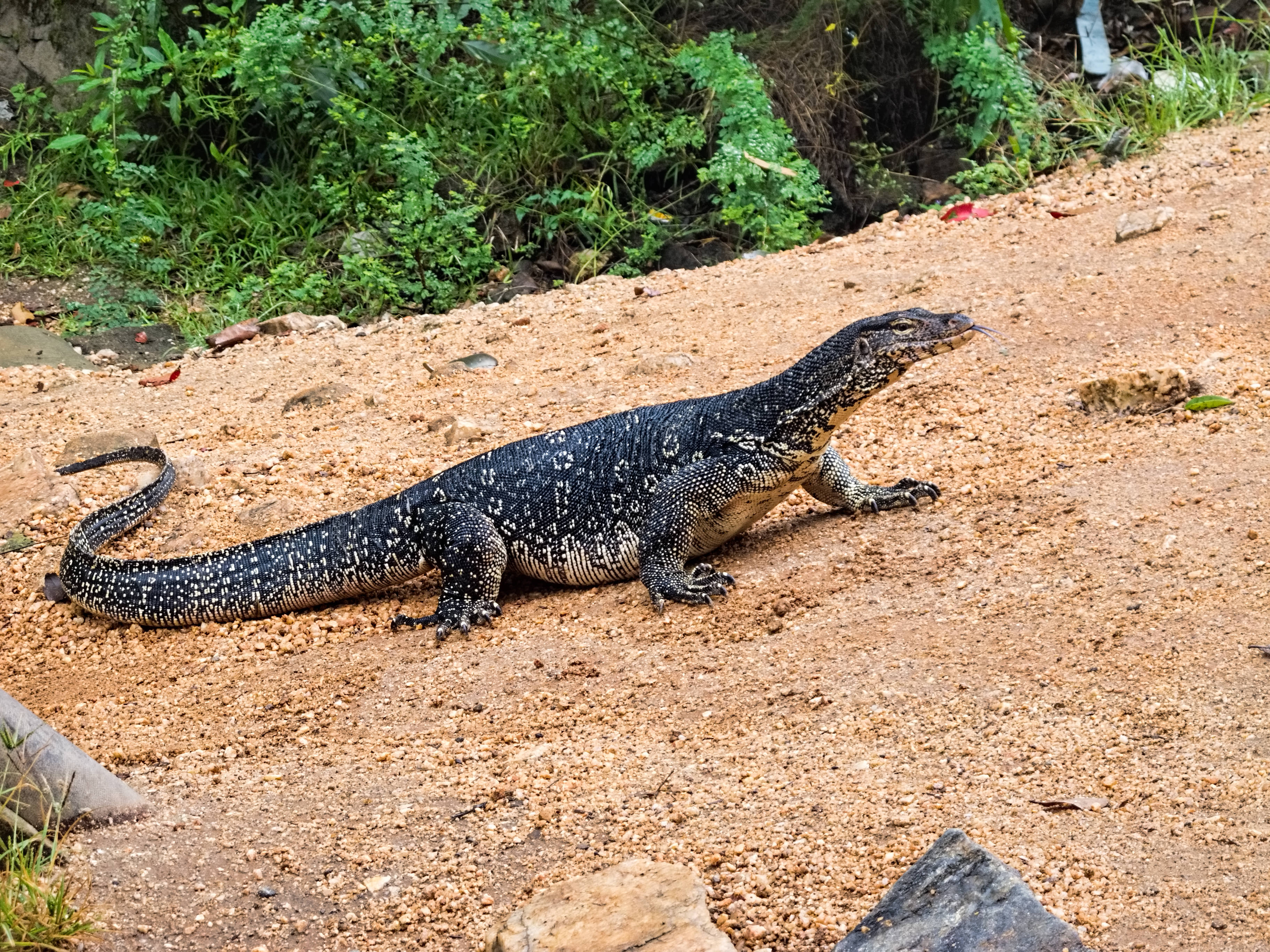
The Asian water monitor is the second-largest lizard with a length of more than 3 m (9.8 ft) and a weight of 25 kg (55 lb)

- The Asian water monitor (Varanus salvator) is the second-biggest lizard in the world after the Komodo dragon, and also the longest lizard in the world. The largest specimens come from Malaysia, particularly around the Cameron Highlands, where specimens over 2.5 m (8.2 ft) in total length are sometimes encountered. Jasmi (1988) records that wild specimens can weigh up to 25 kg (55 lb). The largest member this species from Sri-Lanka and attained in length of about 3.21 m (10.5 ft). Thailand is also home to some huge water monitors, but elsewhere the water monitor grows to smaller sizes. The biggest found in Java are around 2.1 m (6.9 ft) in total length, 2 m (6.6 ft) in Sri Lanka, 1.7 m (5.6 ft) in Sumatra and mainland India and less than 1.5 m (4.91 ft) on the island of Flores. Unverified weights of 50, 70 and even 90 kg (110, 150 and even 198 pounds) have been reported in escaped pets in Florida but such enormous weights remain unverified. The 80 males slaughtered for the skin trade in Sumatra had an average weight of only 3.42 kg (7.5 lb), with a snout-vent length of 56.6 cm (22.3 in) and a total length of 142 cm (4.66 ft); while 42 females had an average weight of 3.52 kg (7.8 lb), with a nose-to-cloaca length of 59 cm (23 in) and a total length of 149.6 cm (4.91 ft). Among these monitor lizards, some specimens weighed from 16–20 kg (35–44 lb). Another study in Sumatra by the same authors also estimates the weight of some specimens at 20 kg (44 lb) while the average adult weight in the population is estimated to be about 7.6 kg (17 lb).

Crocodile monitor (Varanus salvadorii)

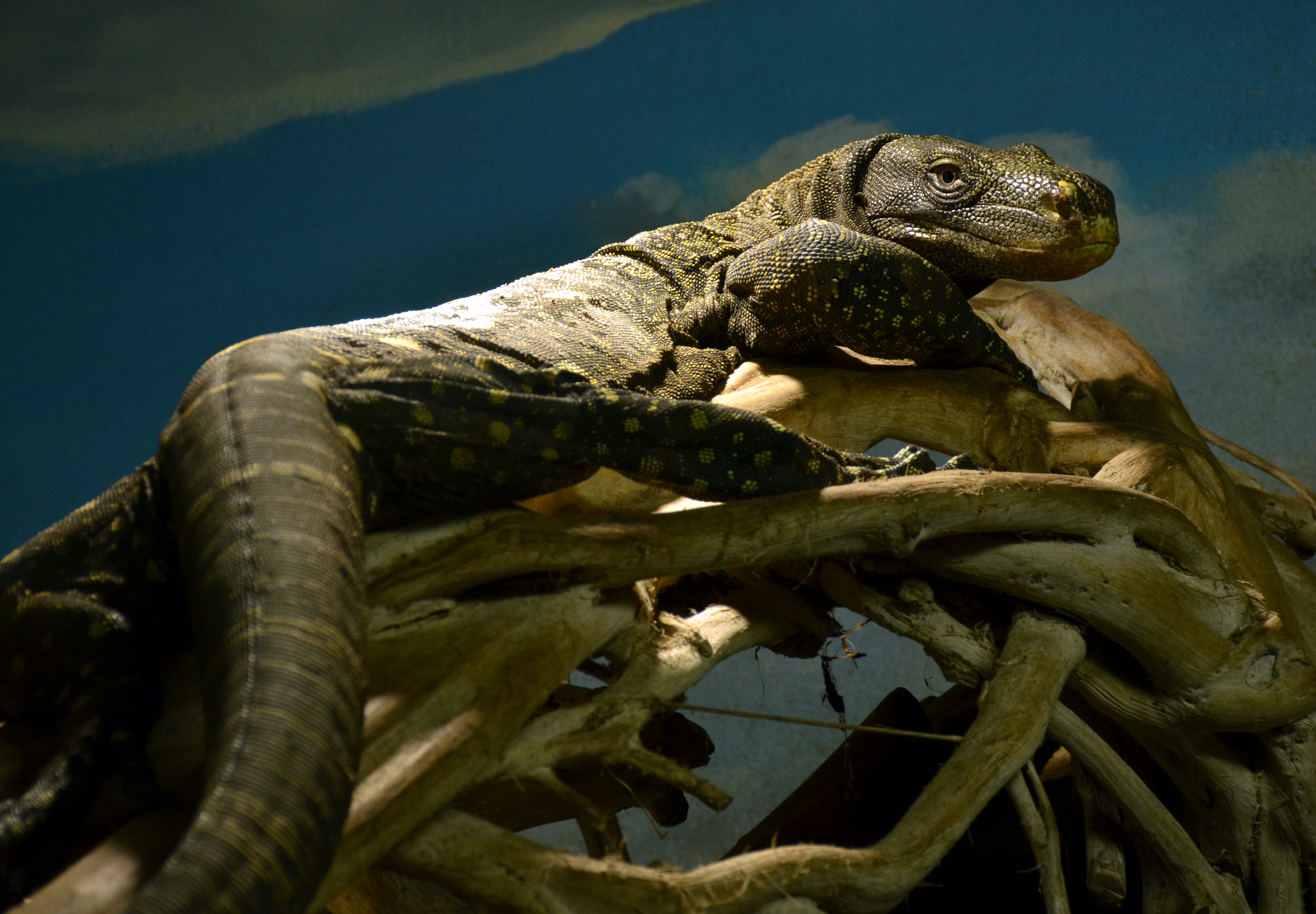
The crocodile monitor sometimes is considered the longest lizard in the world

- The crocodile monitor (Varanus salvadorii) sometimes is regarded as the longest lizard in the world. The longest verified individual, a specimen at Museum Koenig, is 255 cm (8.37 ft) long. Some have been claimed to be much larger, including three individuals that reportedly were 323 cm (10.60 ft), 427 cm (14.01 ft) and 475 cm (15.58 ft) long, but these sizes are unverified. The tail of the crocodile monitor is proportionally very long, typically 2–2.7 times the snout-to-vent length. A weight of up to 20 kg (44 lb) usually is reported, but in this slender and long-tailed arboreal species healthy adults (for example, discounting obese captives) typically weigh 2.5 to 6.38 kg (5.5–14.1 lb). Some sources suggest a mass up to 90 kg (200 lb), although this is highly questionable.

Nile monitor (Varanus niloticus)

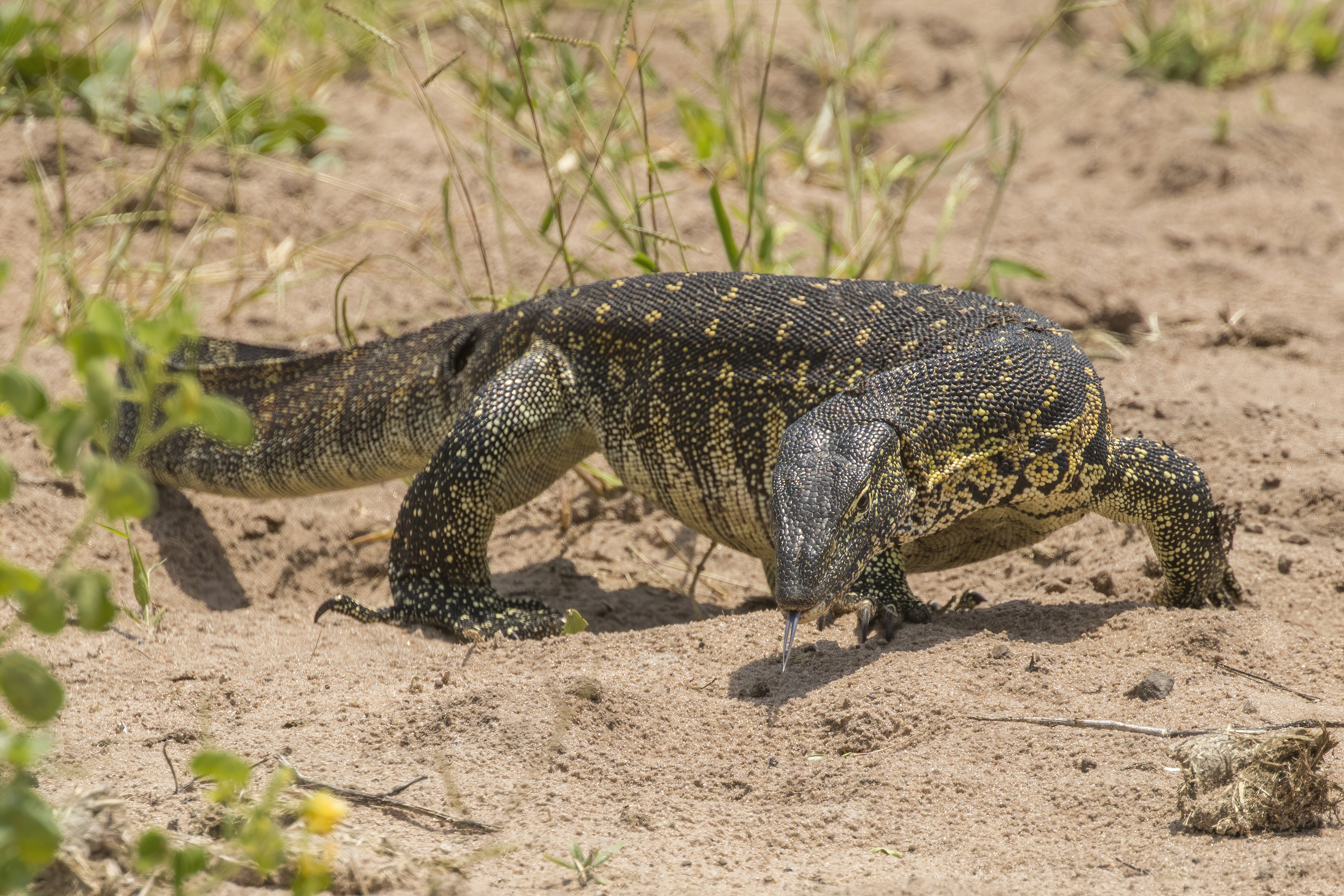
The Nile monitor is the largest lizard native to Africa with a maximum reliable length of more than 2.43 m (8.0 ft) and a mass in almost 20 kg (44 lb)

- The Nile monitor (Varanus niloticus) is the largest lizard native to Africa alive today and fourth or fifth-largest lizard in the world after the Komodo dragon, Asian water monitor, crocodile monitor and competes with perentie. In most cases, males of Nile monitors reach a total length of 150–170 cm (4.9-5.5 ft) and weigh in the region of 5–10 kg (11–22 lb), while females are about 1.34 m (4.4 ft) long and weigh about 3 kg (6.6 lb). Exceptionally large wild specimens of the Nile monitors can probably reach about 2.5 meters (8.2 feet) in length and weigh about 20 kg (44 lb), making them one of the largest lizards in the world. In 1929, a photograph of a Nile monitor from South Africa was published, which was said to have reached a total length of 2.13 m (7.0 ft) and weighed almost 19 kg (42 lb). The same author also reports that he shot another monitor lizard approximately 2.5 m (8.2 ft) long. The largest animal this species reliably known to date reached a total length of 242 cm (7.94 ft) with a length from the muzzle to cloaca length 98 cm (39 in) and estimated at 12–15 kg (26–33 lb) According to Faust (2001), the largest representative of this species measured 2.43 m (7.97 ft). A specimen with a length of 188 cm (6.17 ft) (length from tip of muzzle to cloaca is 74 cm (29 in)) was recorded from Orange Province in South Africa. Near Lake Chad, the maximum recorded size for a male is 2.07 m (6.8 ft) and for a female is 1.55 m (5.1 ft). The largest female Nile monitor for which there is reliable data reached 1.7 m (5.6 ft). Thus, it seems likely that in South Africa some specimens can reach lengths of 200 cm (6.6 ft) or more, but they are very rare.

Perentie (Varanus giganteus)

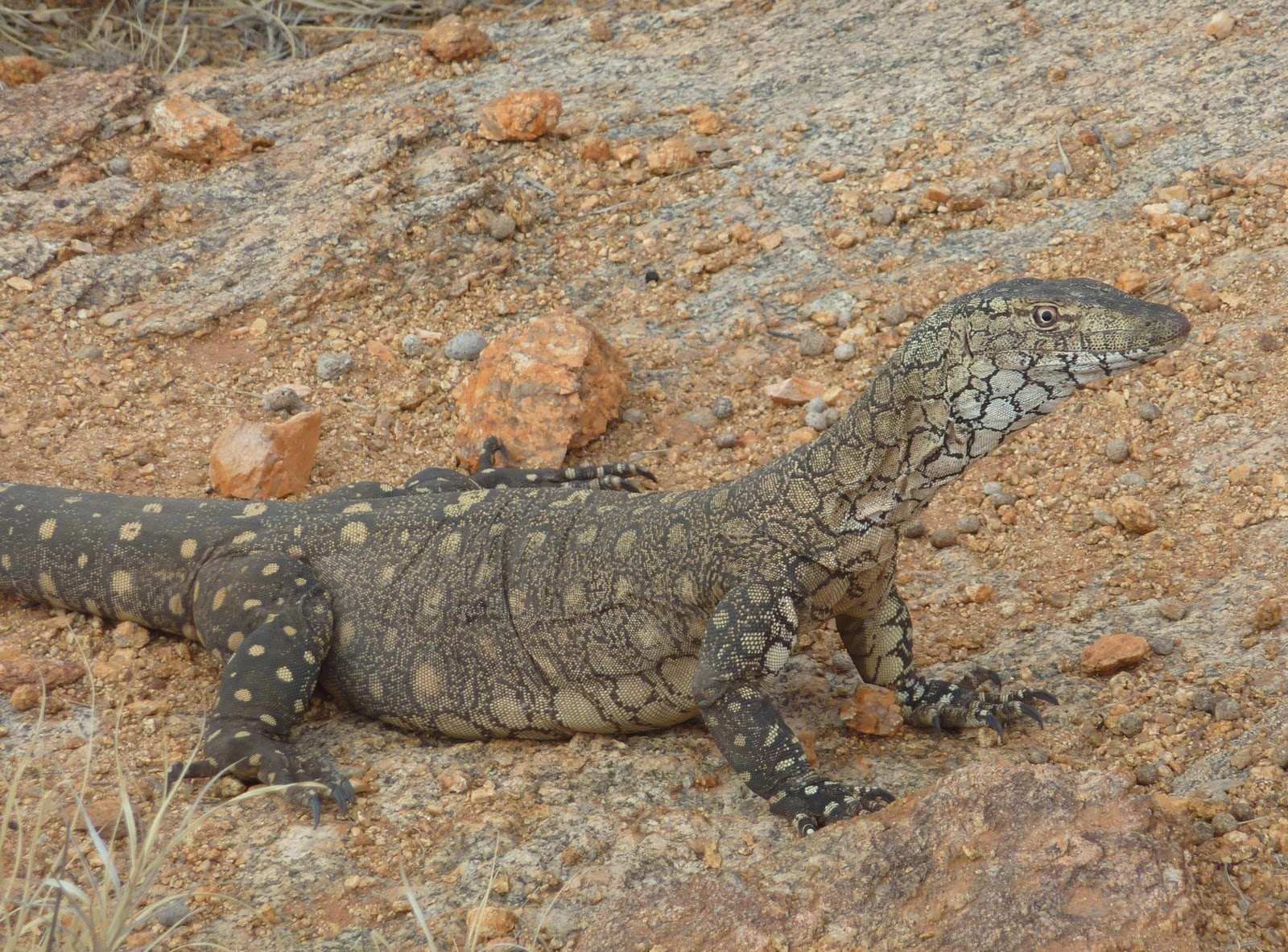
The perentie is the largest lizard Australia, and also one of the biggest lizards in the world

- The perentie (Varanus giganteus) is by average length and weight the largest extant lizard native to Australia and fifth or fourth-biggest lizard in the world after Komodo dragon, Asian water monitor, crocodile monitor and competes with the Nile monitor. It is endemic to arid central Australia, found west of the Great Dividing Range. The largest individual recorded by (Stokes, 1846) measuring 2438 mm (8 ft) in total length. However, based on the vagueness of this account, some authors claim Stokes' reported measurement of 2438 mm (8 ft) is exaggerated and a more likely maximum length may instead be 2.3 m (7.5 ft) (Stirling, 1912). There have been larger individuals supposedly measuring more than 2.5 m (8.2 ft) in total length and 20 kg (44 lb) in mass reported but such claims remain unverified. The maximum size of the perentie is probably not as great as many authors claim King & Green (1993) provide a useful discussion of size in this species. The longest found on Barrow Island by King et al. (1989) had a total length of 1.96 m (6.4 ft) with a SVL in 88 cm (35 in) and the heaviest weighed 11.7 kg (26 lb). Butler (1970) record s a specimen of 17 kg (37 lb) with a total length of 1.93 m (6.3 ft) from the same island. Stokes (1846) records that two specimens collected on Barrow Island in 1840 had total lengths of 2.13 m (7.0 ft). Strimple (1988) suggested that one of these animals was the type specimen used by Gray, which has a total length of only 2.02 m (6.6 ft). Many perenties do not grow to such an enormous size, and the specimens on Barrow Island may grow larger than the main population. The limited data available suggests that females reach a smaller maximum size than males, rarely exceeding 1.4 m (4.6 ft) TL. Bredl (1987) records males of 1.8 and 1.9 m (5 ft 11 in and 6 ft 3 in) TL, and a female of 1.3 m (4.3 ft) TL. It appears that perenties approaching 2 m (6.6 ft) in length are the exception rather than the rule, and that in general few specimens grow larger than 1.5 m (4.91 ft). If specimens of 2.4 m (7.9 ft) or more have ever existed, none seem to have survived to the present.

Black-throated monitor (Varanus albigularis microstictus)

- The black-throated monitor (Varanus albigularis microstictus) is a subspecies of rock monitor (Varanus albigularis) and, perhaps, the heaviest lizard in Africa. Although, little information is available on the size of this species of monitor lizards. According to many information black-throated monitor attains 2.1 m (6.89 ft) in length and 27 kg (60 lb) in mass. However, unknown whether this mass is reached in captivity or in the wild. By another – black-throated monitor has a mass of 23 kg (51 lb). However, specimens 2.13 m (7.0 ft) for this species rock monitor was recorded.

Lace monitor (Varanus varius)

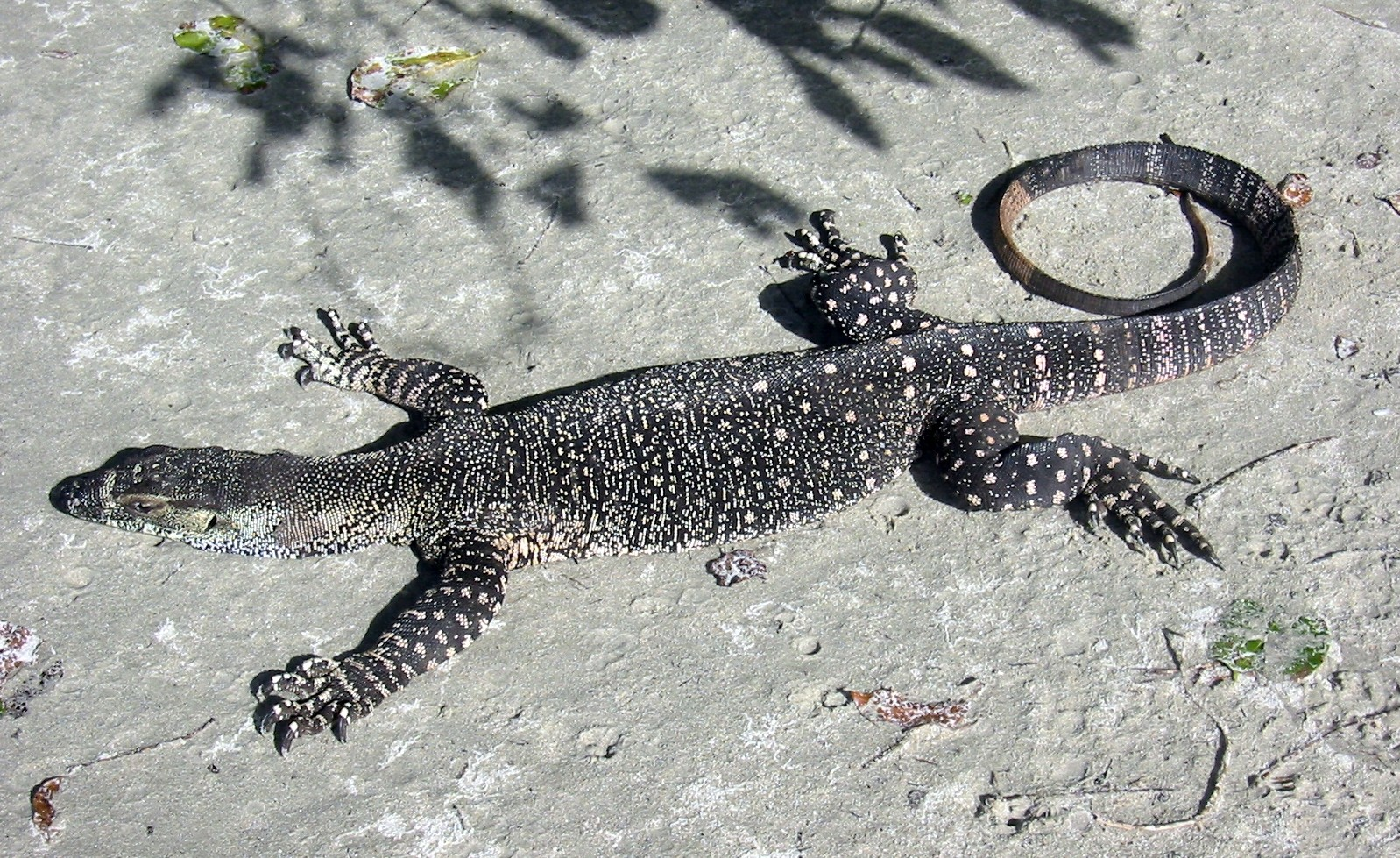
The lace monitor – the second-largest lizard native to Australia and seven-largest lizard in the world

- The lace monitor (Varanus varius) is the second-largest lizard in Australia after the perentie and seven-largest lizard in the world overall. The largest instances may reach a length of 2 m (6.6 ft) with a SVL of 76.5 cm (30.1 in) and a mass of 14 kg (31 lb). In 1986 Gerard Krefft suggested that lace monitors grow as large as 250 cm (8.2 ft). None of this size exist now and specimens of 2 m (6.6 ft) TL are exceptional. A lizard from Mallacoota, Victoria measured 75 cm (30 in) SVL, 192 cm (6.30 ft) TL and weighed 14 kg (31 lb). Another from Healesville was 192 cm (6.30 ft) long and weighed almost 20.5 kg (45 lb). It was found to have eaten four foxcubs, three young rabbits and three large blue-tongued skinks, and all this was taken into account when weighing, is unknown. And, accordingly, the most commonly used maximum size for this species is a length of 192 cm (6.30 ft) and a weight of 14 kg (31 lb) for the previously mentioned specimen. In contrast, a large male in the spring measured 1.5 m (4.91 ft) TL and weighed 4.2 kg (9.3 lb). Males grow larger than females and probably have larger home ranges.

In the genus Varanus has more 80 species of lizards and all of to 11 subgenera, members which vary considerably in sizes:

==== Subgenus Empagusia ====
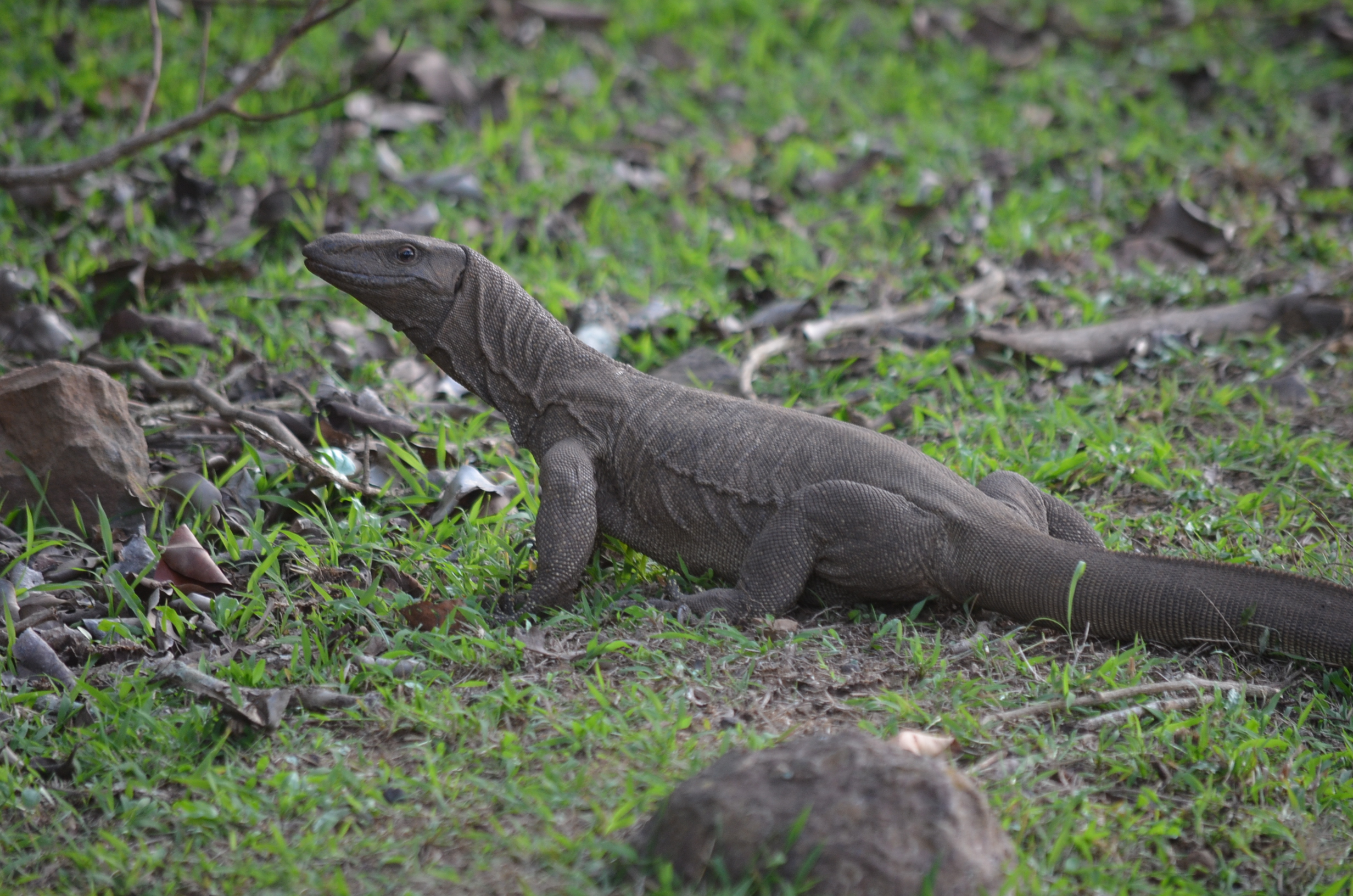
Bengal monitor is the second-largest lizard in Asia after Asian water monitor

- The largest representative of the subgenus Empagusia is Bengal monitor (Varanus bengalensis) with a length in 1.75 m (5.7 ft) and a SVL of 75 cm (30 in), a mass of 7.2 kg (16 lb), and in captivity even more – 10.2 kg (22 lb). However, typical measurements are much less – 1.5 m (4.91 ft) in a length and 2.7 kg (6.0 lb) in a mass. Even so, by some reports it grows much larger.
- Another large species of this group are the clouded monitor (Varanus nebulosus) with a length of 1.5 m (4.91 ft) and a SVL of 60 cm (24 in), the roughneck monitor (V. rudicollis), which has a total length of 1.46 m (4.8 ft), a SVL of 59 cm (23 in) with a mass of 4 kg (8.8 lb), the Dumeril's monitor (V. dumerilii) (maximum size is about 135 cm (4.43 ft) TL. A breeding pair maintained in captivity measured 130 cm (4.3 ft) TL, 2,950 g (6.50 lb) (male) and 100 cm (3.3 ft), 2,300 g (5.1 lb) (female). Wild animals of 30 cm (12 in) SVL weigh about 1 kg (2.2 lb)) and the yellow monitor (V. flavescens) with a maximum length of 95.2 cm (3.12 ft), a SVL of 44.8 cm (17.6 in) and a mass of 1,040 g (2.29 lb).

==== Subgenus Euprepiosaurus ====
- The largest members of this subgenus are the mangrove monitor (Varanus indicus) and its close relatives with a total length of 1.5 m (4.91 ft) (The largest Mariana monitors (V. tsukamotoi) found on Guam were 58 cm (23 in) for male and 44 cm (17 in) for female in SVL with wrights of 1,900 g (4.2 lb) and 500 g (1.1 lb) in weight respectively), the Rainer Günther's monitor (V. rainerguentheri) with a maximum total length of 1.33 m (4.4 ft), probably even 1.5 m (4.91 ft), the tricolor monitor (V. yuwonoi) having the maximum length of 1.46 m (4.8 ft), the blue-tailed monitor (V. doreanus) exceeding 1.35 m (4.4 ft) long, the Rennell Island monitor (V. juxtindicus) reaching 1.33 m (4.4 ft) in length and the New Ireland monitor (V. douarrha) growing the length in 1.33 m (4.4 ft).
- Other large lizards in this group include the quince monitor (Varanus melinus) (maximum length of 1.28 m (4.2 ft)), the peach-throated monitor (V. jobiensis) (a total length of 1.2 m (3.9 ft) and a SVL of 45 cm (18 in)), the Mussau Island blue-tailed monitor (V. semotus) (a total length of 1.2 m (3.9 ft) and a SVL of 48 cm (19 in)) and the sago monitor (V. obor) (a total length of 1.13 m (3.7 ft) and a SVL of 44 cm (17 in)).

==== Subgenus Hapturosaurus ====
- The largest tree monitor is the blue tree monitor (Varanus macraei) with a maximum total length about 1.1 m (3.6 ft) and a SVL of 36 cm (14 in). Other large tree monitors are the emerald tree monitor (V. prasinus), which can attain 1 m (3.3 ft) in total length, 30 cm (12 in) in snout-vent length, the black tree monitor (V. beccarii) with a maximum size of 34 cm (13 in) SVL, 94.5 cm (3.10 ft) total length and the Bogert's monitor (V. bogerti) measuring a length of 94 cm (3.08 ft) with a SVL of 32 cm (13 in).

==== Subgenus Odatria ====
- Whilst this subgenus has many species, they are the smallest monitor lizards. It includes Dampier Peninsula monitor (Varanus sparnus) – the smallest monitor with a length of 227 mm (8.9 in), a SVL of 116 mm (4.6 in) and a mass of 16.3 g (0.57 oz).
- The largest species in this subgenus is the black-palmed rock monitor (Varanus glebopalma), reaching the maximum size of 397 mm (15.6 in) and 1.1 m (3.6 ft) for SVL and total length respectively (an average mass constitute 240 g (8.5 oz) with a SVL of 290 mm (11 in), for the max.size much higher). Another big member of this group is Mitchell's water monitor (Varanus mitchelli), which may grow to a length in 60–96 cm (1.97–3.15 ft) with a SVL of 22–32 cm (8.7–12.6 in).

==== Subgenus Papusaurus ====
- The only species Papusaurus is a crocodile monitor (Varanus salvadorii) (see higher).

==== Subgenus Philippinosaurus ====
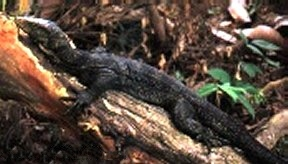
The Gray's monitor along with its relatives is one of heaviest lizards in the world

- These large frugivorous monitor lizards may be 175 cm (5.74 ft) long or more with a mass of >8 kg (18 lb). The Northern Sierra Madre forest monitor (Varanus bitatawa) with a maximum size instead be 180 cm (5.9 ft) in length and 9 kg (20 lb) in mass, the Gray's monitor (V. olivaceus), the biggest individual of which was just 188 cm (6.17 ft) long and a mass of 8.9 kg (20 lb) and the Panay monitor (V. mabitang) with the largest specimen which had a length of 175 cm (5.74 ft) and a mass in 8 kg (18 lb), are among of the biggest lizards in the world. They measure 76.6 cm (30.2 in), 73 cm (29 in) and 70 cm (28 in) SVL respectively.

==== Subgenus Polydaedalus ====
- The largest species Polydaedalus are the nile monitor (Varanus niloticus) and the black-throated monitor (V. albigularis microstictus) (see higher).
- Another large member of African monitors is a rock monitor, and to be more precise, its type species – white-throated monitor (Varanus albigularis albigularis) with a maximum length of 2 m (6.6 ft) and 15–17 kg (33–37 lb) and an average size of 0.8–1.5 m (2.6–4.9 ft) in length and 3.2–5 kg (7.1–11.0 lb) for females and 6–8 kg (13–18 lb) for males in mass by some sources. But, however, according to others even mass in 7.7 kg (17 lb) is a very rarely.
- Large sizes are also reached by also other members of Polydaedalus. This include savannah monitor (Varanus exanthematicus) and Yemen monitor (V. yemenensis) with a length of 100 cm (3.3 ft) (50 cm (20 in) SVL) and 115 cm (3.77 ft) (59 cm (23 in) SVL) respectively (First one can weighing don't less 1 kg (2.2 lb)) However, Bosc's monitor in captivity can be extremely obese and exceed 150 cm (4.9 ft) (75 cm (30 in) SVL) long and 6 kg (13 lb)) weight.
- The ornate monitor can attains the length of 2 m (6.6 ft), however, the ornate monitor is not currently considered a separate species, but is merely a polymorphism of two different species.

==== Subgenus Psammosaurus ====
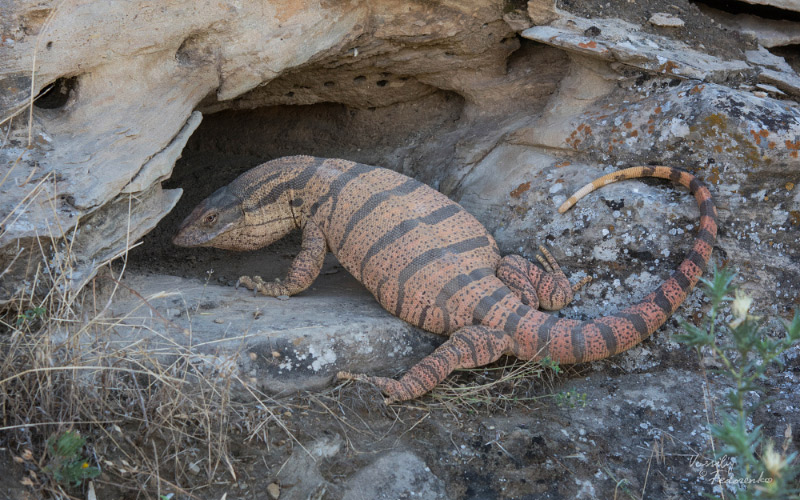
The Caspian monitor is a largest lizard in Central Asia, with a maximum reliable length of 1.4 m (4.6 ft) and a mass of almost 3 kg (6.6 lb)

- The subgenus Psammosaurus includes large and medium-sized monitor lizards, growing to a length not less than 120 cm (3.9 ft). The largest member of this little group and also the largest lizard in Central Asia is the desert monitor (Varanus griseus), specifically Caspian monitor (Varanus griseus caspius) with a max.total length of 1.4 m (4.6 ft), a SVL of 58.5 cm (23.0 in) and a mass of 2,850 g (6.28 lb) and a SVL of 46 cm (18 in) with a mass in 2,700 g (6.0 lb) for longest and heaviest males and females respectively. The Nesterov's desert monitor (V. nesterovi) is also quite large, attaining 1.2 m (3.9 ft) in length and 50 cm (20 in) in SVL.

==== Subgenus Solomonosaurus ====
- The Solomon Island spiny monitor (Varanus spinulosus) is a species of subgenus Solomonosaurus, with a maximum reliable length and mass in captivity of 1 m (3.3 ft) (SVL 31 cm (12 in)) and 841 g (29.7 oz) respectively.

==== Subgenus Soterosaurus ====
- The largest Soterosaurus is an Asian water monitor (Varanus salvator) (see higher).
- Second largest after Asian water monitor are the marbled water monitor (Varanus marmoratus) and the Palawan water monitor (Varanus palawanensis) with a total length of almost 2 m (6.6 ft) (SVL of last one measuring 78.8 cm (31.0 in)). By the data marbled water monitor can weigh about 7.2 kg (16 lb), although since V. palawanensis was previously considered a subspecies of V. marmoratus, which species this weight referred to is unknown.
- Even medium-sized monitors in this subgenus are quite large. For example, the yellow-headed water monitor (Varanus cumingi) and the large-scaled water monitor (V. nuchalis) with maximum length of 1.5 m (4.9 ft) and 1.45 m (4.8 ft), a SVL of 60 cm (24 in) and 53 cm (21 in) and 2.5 kg (5.5 lb) and 2.8 kg (6.2 lb) in max. mass respectively. Also they include the Togian water monitor (V. togianus) (1.5 m (4.9 ft) in TL and 65 cm (26 in) in SVL), the Samar water monitor (V. samarensis) (1.4 m (4.6 ft) long with 53 cm (21 in) SVL), the Rasmussen's water monitor (V. rasmusseni) (1.21 m (4.0 ft) in length and SVL 46.6 cm (18.3 in)) and the Enteng's monitor lizard (V. dalubhasa) (1.16 m (3.8 ft) long and 50.5 cm (19.9 in) in SVL).

==== Subgenus Varanus ====
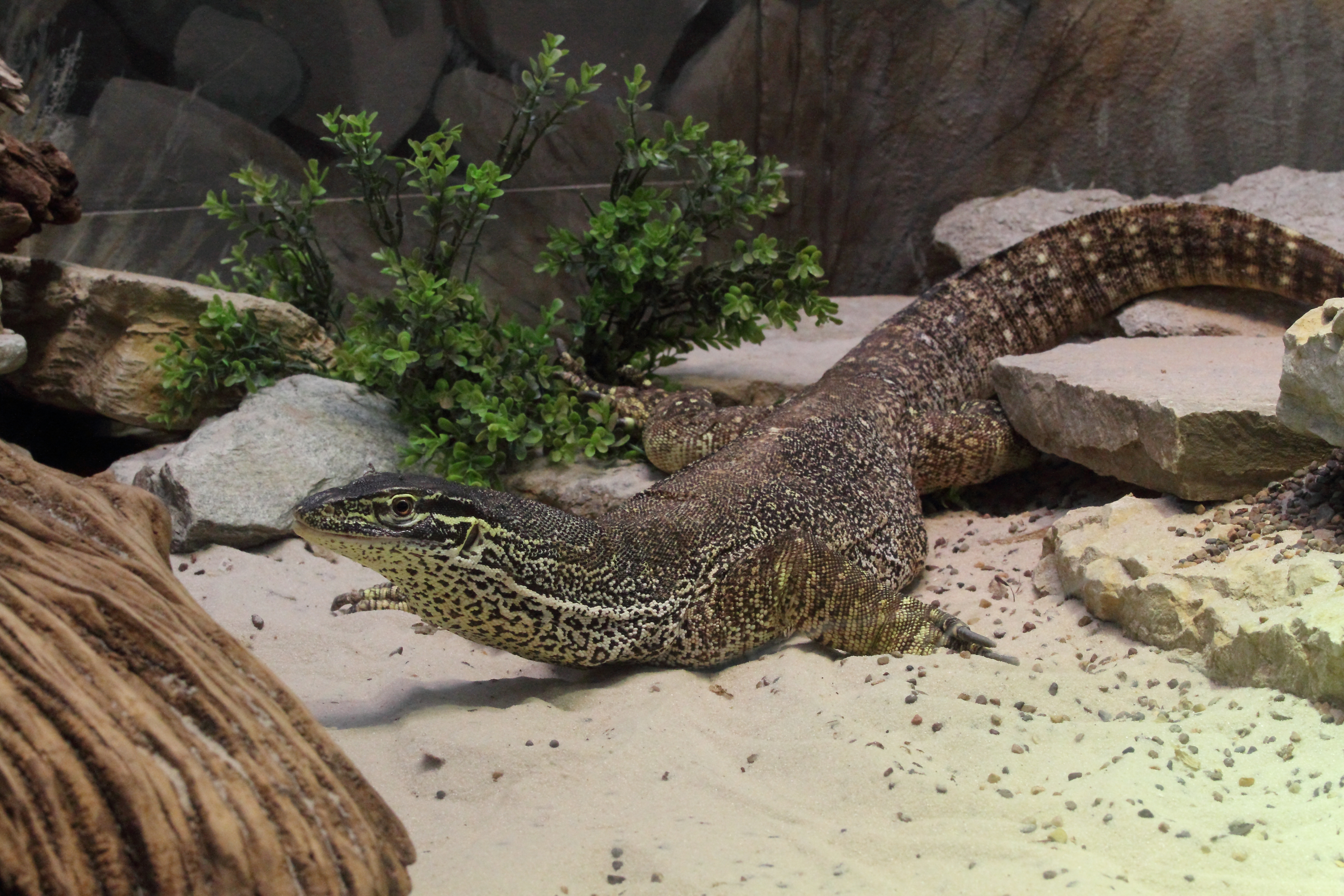
The Argus monitor is third largest Australian lizard with mass more 7 kg (15 lb)

- The largest members of this group are the Komodo dragon (Varanus komodoensis), perentie (V. giganteus) and lace monitor (V. varius) (see higher).
- After them is the yellow-spotted monitor or Argus monitor (Varanus panoptes), which also is the third biggest lizard in Australia, with a maximum length of 1.6 m (5.2 ft) (SVL of 74 cm (29 in)) and mass of 7 kg (15 lb), although in captivity huge individuals can weigh about 10 kg (22 lb) and even more.
- A close relative of the aforementioned species is Gould's monitor (Varanus gouldii), also attains large sizes — exclusively large specimens measuring length of 1.55 m (5.1 ft) (SVL of 67 cm (26 in)) with a mass of 5 kg (11 lb). The Rosenberg's monitor (V. rosenbergi) grows 1.5 m (4.9 ft) long, probably 1.6 m (5.2 ft) with a SVL of 70 cm (28 in).
- Though not as long as some other species of large varanids, the Spencer's monitor (Varanus spenceri) can have a high weight for its length due to its massive and bulky body, and has a length of 1.2 m (3.9 ft) (SVL of 55 cm (22 in)) and mass from 2.25 kg (5.0 lb) till 6 kg (13 lb) depending on sources.
- The smallest representative of this genus is the Mertens' water monitor (Varanus mertensi) with a length of 1.3 m (4.3 ft) (SVL of 48 cm (19 in)). Though not as bulky as some other species of monitor lizards, in captivity it can weigh up to 4.9 kg (11 lb).

=== Night lizards (Xantusidae) ===
- The largest night lizard is the yellow-spotted tropical night lizard (Lepidophylum flavimaculatum) which attains a snout-to-vent length (SVL) of 12.69 cm (5.00 in) with a tail 1/3 times exceeding the body length.

=== Knob-scaled lizards (Xenosauridae) ===
- The largest xenosaurid is a knob-scaled lizard (Xenosaurus grandis) with a snout-vent length of 12.9 cm (5.1 in) and a total length of 24 cm (9.4 in).

== See also ==
- Megalania – the largest land lizard to have ever lived
- Mosasauridae, an extinct family in the order Squamata which includes the largest lizards of the world
- List of largest reptiles
- List of largest snakes
- List of largest extinct lizards

== Sources ==
- "Eastern Blue-tongue Lizard". The Australian Museum. 2000.
