= List of largest extinct lizards =

List of largest extinct lizards which are members of the order Squamata.

== List ==
Rank	Scientific name	Family	Largest specimen	Length	Mass	Image
1	Tylosaurus rex	Mosasauridae	"KUVP 5033"	13.2 m (43 ft)	-	
2	Mosasaurus hoffmani	Mosasauridae	"CCMGE 10/2469"	12 m (39 ft)	-	
3	Tylosaurus bernardi	Mosasauridae	"IRSNB_R_23"	11.6 m (38 ft)^{Table S1}	-	

== Geckos (Gekkota) ==
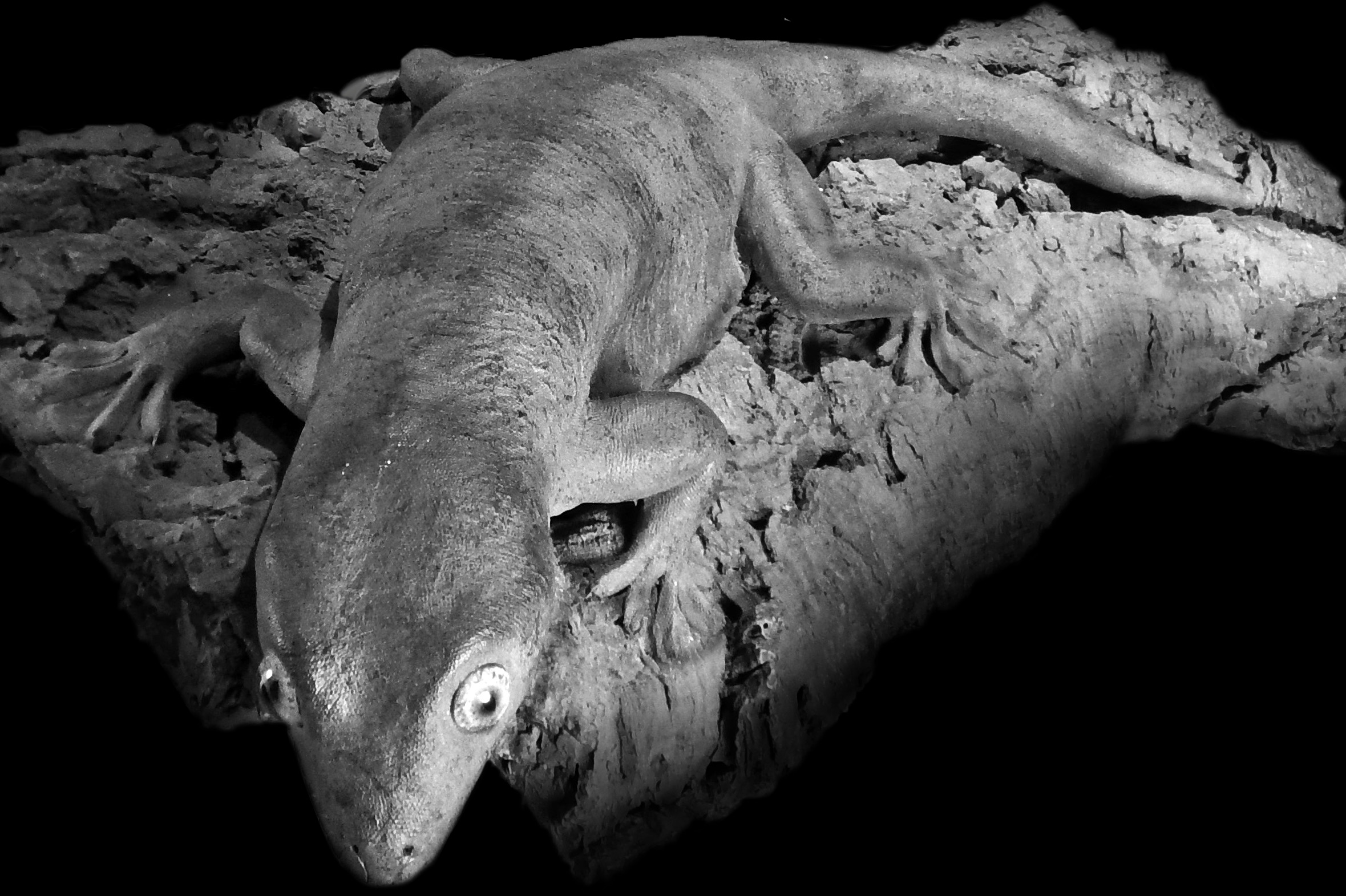
Kawekaweau is the largest among of all known geckos

- An extinct member of family Diplodactylidae, Kawekaweau or Delcourt's giant gecko (Gigarcanum delcourti), the largest gecko of all time. It had a snout-vent length of 37 cm (14.6 in), a total length of 60 cm (23.6 in). and a mass of 896.98 g (31.640 oz).
- Some members of genus Phelsuma are among the largest of extant geckos (see list of largest extant lizards). However, the extinct Rodrigues giant day gecko (Phelsuma gigas) was the largest day gecko and second-largest of all geckos (after the kawekaweau), with a length of up to 40 cm (15.74 in) and possibly even 44 cm (17.3 in), and body mass 193.43 g (6.8 oz).

== Iguanas (Iguanidae) ==
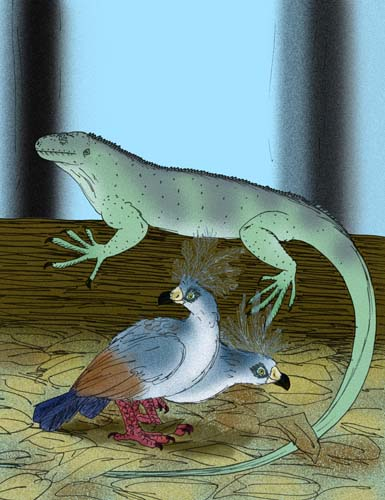
The Lapitiguana is the largest iguana fossil

- The extant members of genus Brachylophus are iguanas small and medium-sized, growing a length of 60–75 cm (24–30 in). Although, in the past there was a much larger member of this family – Brachylophus gibbonsi, reached in length of 1.2 m (3.9 ft), and thus, was 1.8 times longer than its modern relatives. Another very large extinct iguanid, reached even larger – Lapitiguana impensa which had a length of 1.5 m (4.91 ft).

== True lizards (Lacertidae) ==
- The largest ever lived lacertid, the goliath Tenerife lizard (Gallotia goliath) reached the length of 1.2–1.25 m (3.9–4.1 ft).

== Marine lizards (Mosasauridae) ==
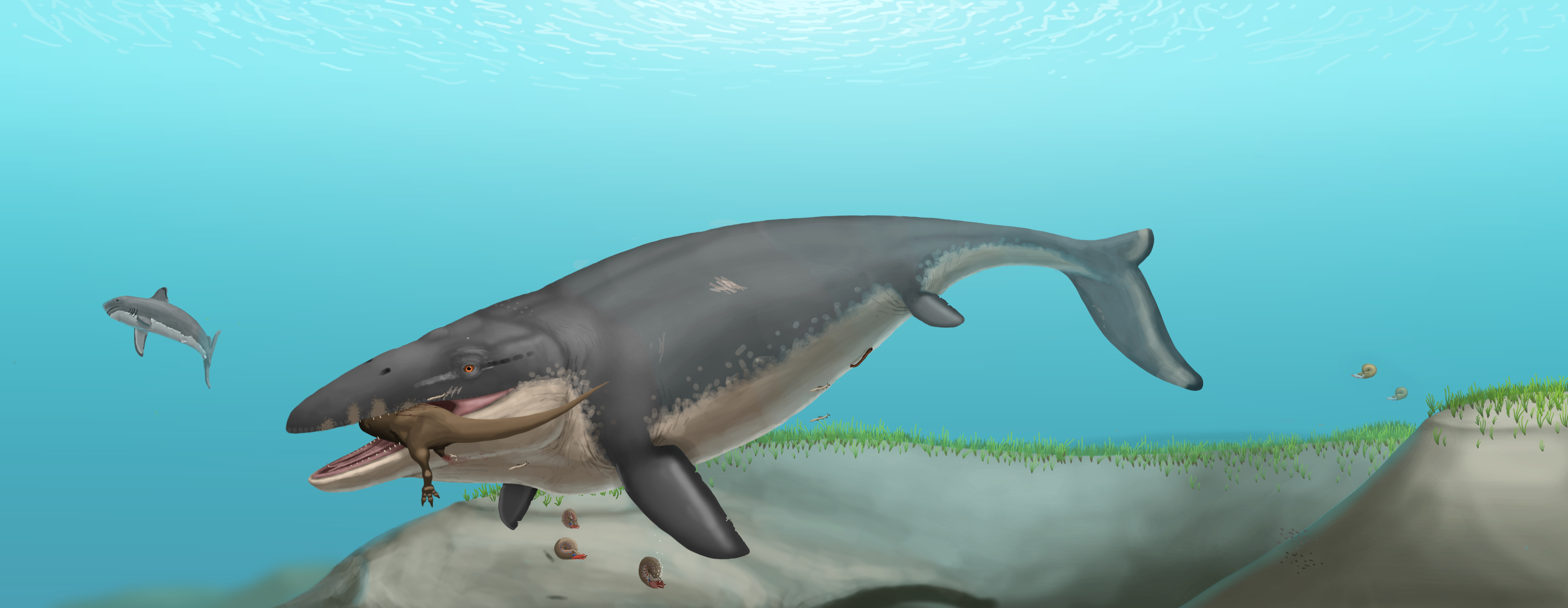
Mosasaurs were not only the largest lizards, but also the largest representatives of the Squamata order, as well as one of the biggest marine reptiles

- The largest mosasaurs were Mosasaurus and Tylosaurus species, which grew to lengths of around 11–13 meters (36–43 ft).

== Skinks (Scincidae) ==
- The Cape Verde giant skink (Chioninia coctei) was a very large skink that grew up to a snout-vent length of 32 cm (13 in) and 56.5 cm (22.2 in) in a total length.
- Another very large extinct skink is the Mauritian giant skink (Leiolopisma mauritiana) which is the largest skink so far discovered; it grew to a snout-vent length of 34 cm (13 in) with a total length of 68 cm (27 in), and according to some information up to 80 cm (31 in)

== Monitor lizards (Varanidae) ==
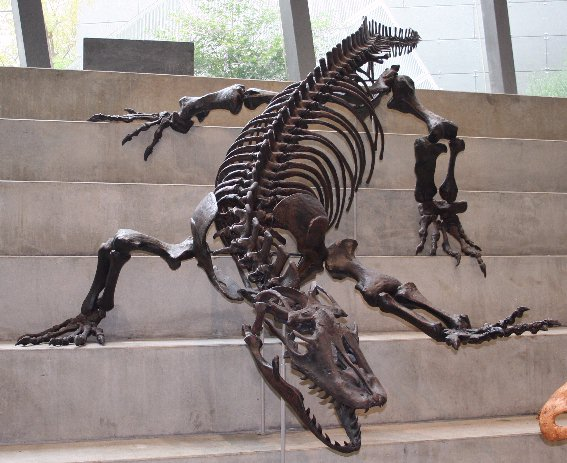
The largest terrestrial lizard ever discovered was extinct megalania from Australia

- The prehistoric Australian megalania (Varanus priscus), which may have existed up to 40,000 years ago, is the largest varanid and the largest terrestrial lizard known to exist, but the lack of a complete skeleton has resulted in a wide range of size estimates. Molnar's 2004 assessment resulted in an average weight of 320 kg (710 lb) and length of 4.5 m (15 ft), and a maximum of 1,940 kg (4,280 lb) at 7 m (23 ft) in length, which is toward the high end of the early estimates. However, a 2009 study estimated megalania at 5.5 m (18 ft) and 575 kg (1,268 lb).
- Some prehistoric non-varanoid anguimorphs approached varanid sizes. Palaeosaniwa was roughly comparable to a large monitor lizard (Varanidae) in size. Measuring around 3–3.5 m (9.8–11.5 ft) in length, it is among the largest terrestrial lizards known from the Mesozoic era. Later study shows estimation with snout–vent length about 85 centimetres (33 in) for Maastrichtian species. Asprosaurus may compete with Palaeosaniwa in size. Another large Mesozoic lizard was Chianghsia, with snout-vent length of over 1 m (3 ft 3 in).

== See also ==
- Largest prehistoric animals
