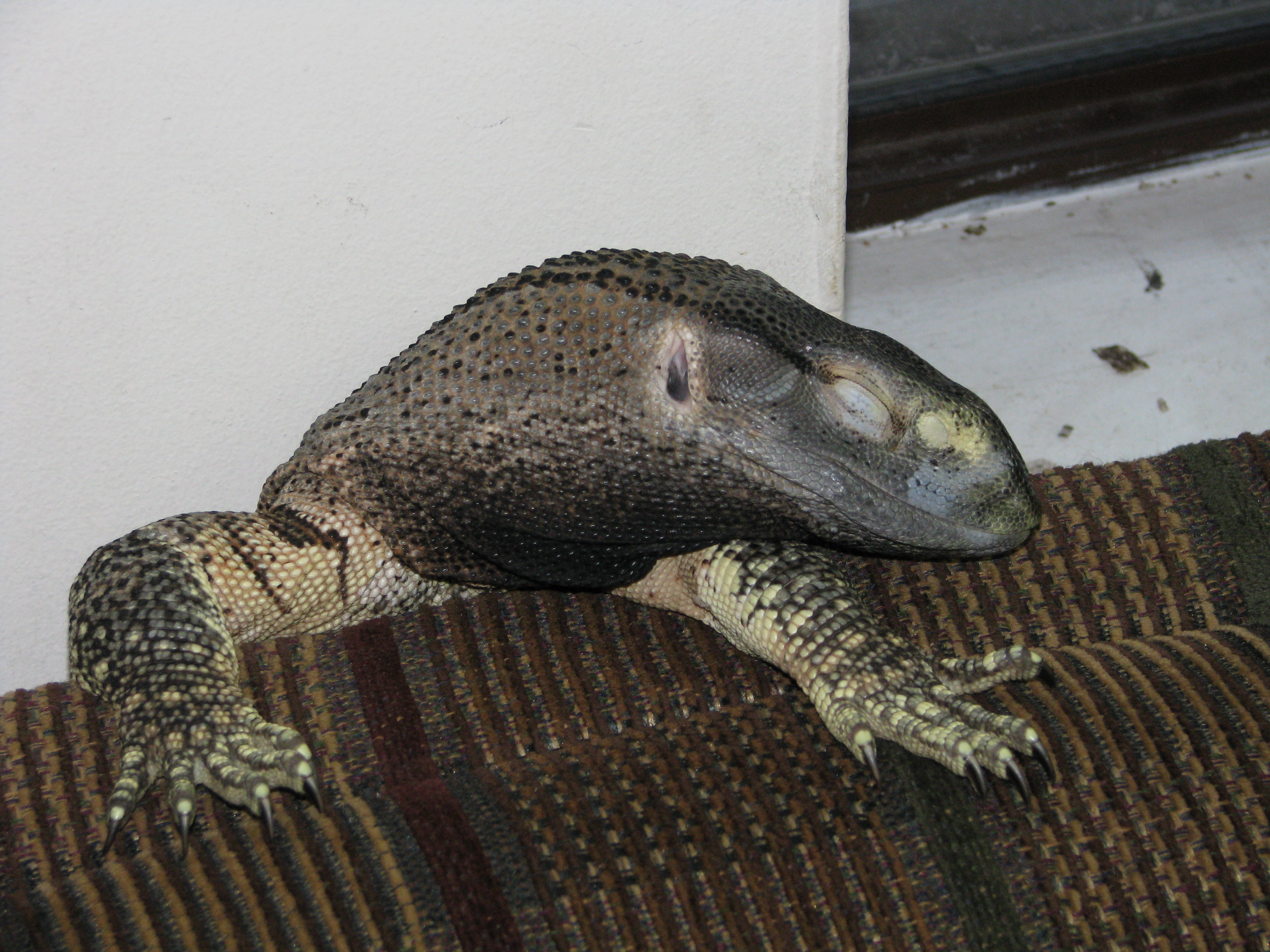

Scientific classification
- Kingdom: Animalia
- Phylum: Chordata
- Class: Reptilia
- Order: Squamata
- Suborder: Anguimorpha
- Family: Varanidae
- Genus: Varanus
- Species: V. albigularis
- Subspecies: V. a. microstictus

Trinomial name
- Varanus albigularis microstictus Boettger, 1893

Synonyms
- Varanus microstictus Boettger, 1893; Varanus exanthematicus microstictus — Mertens, 1942; Varanus exanthematicus ionidesi Laurent, 1964; Varanus albigularis microstictus — Böhme, 1988; Varanus albigularis ionidesi — Böhme, 1988; Varanus albigularis microstictus — Phillips in Pianka, D. King & R. King, 2004

= Black-throated monitor =

Subspecies of lizard

The black-throated monitor (Varanus albigularis microstictus) is a subspecies of monitor lizard in the family Varanidae. The subspecies is native to Tanzania.

== Description ==
Varanus albigularis microstictus is usually a dark gray-brown with yellowish or white markings, and can reach up to 7 feet (2.1 m) in total length (including tail) and weigh more than 60 pounds (27 kg). It is the largest of the four subspecies of the rock monitor, V. albigularis.

== Etymology ==
The generic name, Varanus, is derived from the Arabic word waral ورل, which is translated to English as "warn" or "warning."

The specific name, albigularis, comes from a compound of two Latin words: albus meaning "white" and gula meaning "throat".

The subspecific synonym, ionidesi, is in honor of Constantine John Philip Ionides (1901-1968), called the "Snake Man of British East Africa".

== Diet ==
In captivity V. a. microstictus feeds mainly on whole prey, such as mice, rats, snakes, lizards, freshwater mollusks, small birds, large roaches, crustaceans, fish, and eggs. It will commonly accept cat and dog food, which is not acceptable as a staple diet due to an improper nutrient profile and high caloric content. In the wild, it will eat anything it can catch.

== See also ==
- List of largest extant lizards
- White-throated monitor
- Rock monitor
