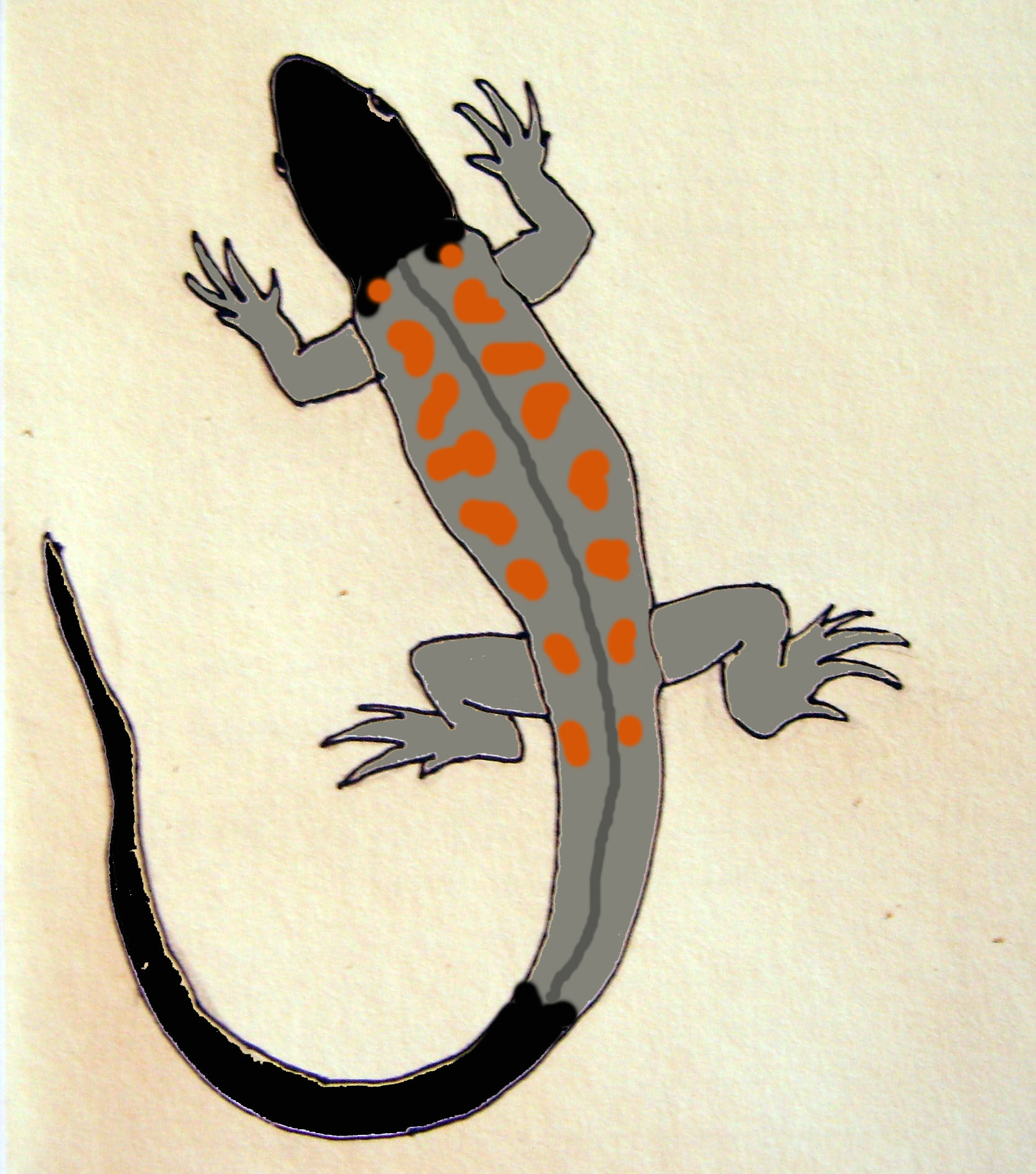

Conservation status
- Least Concern (IUCN 3.1)

Scientific classification
- Kingdom: Animalia
- Phylum: Chordata
- Class: Reptilia
- Order: Squamata
- Suborder: Iguania
- Family: Liolaemidae
- Genus: Liolaemus
- Species: L. nigriceps

Binomial name
- Liolaemus nigriceps (Philippi, 1860)

= Liolaemus nigriceps =

Species of lizard

Liolaemus nigriceps (black-headed lizard or black tree iguana) is a species of lizard in the family Liolaemidae. It is endemic to the Atacama in Chile, and grows to roughly 2.5 inches (6.25 cm) long.
