= Liolaemus pantherinus =

Conservation status
- Least Concern (IUCN 3.1)

Scientific classification
- Kingdom: Animalia
- Phylum: Chordata
- Class: Reptilia
- Order: Squamata
- Suborder: Iguania
- Family: Liolaemidae
- Genus: Liolaemus
- Species: L. pantherinus

Binomial name
- Liolaemus pantherinus Pellegrin, 1909

Species of lizard

Liolaemus pantherinus, the panther tree iguana, is a species of lizard in the family Liolaemidae. It is from Peru, Bolivia and Chile.
