= Liolaemus robertoi =

Conservation status
- Endangered (IUCN 3.1)

Scientific classification
- Kingdom: Animalia
- Phylum: Chordata
- Class: Reptilia
- Order: Squamata
- Suborder: Iguania
- Family: Liolaemidae
- Genus: Liolaemus
- Species: L. robertoi

Binomial name
- Liolaemus robertoi Pincheira-Donoso & Núñez, 2004

Species of lizard

Liolaemus robertoi, Roberto's lizard, is a species of lizard in the family Liolaemidae. It is found in Chile.
