= Liolaemus chlorostictus =

Conservation status
- Least Concern (IUCN 3.1)

Scientific classification
- Kingdom: Animalia
- Phylum: Chordata
- Class: Reptilia
- Order: Squamata
- Suborder: Iguania
- Family: Liolaemidae
- Genus: Liolaemus
- Species: L. chlorostictus

Binomial name
- Liolaemus chlorostictus Laurent, 1993

Species of lizard

Liolaemus chlorostictus is a species of lizard in the family Liolaemidae. It is native to Bolivia and Argentina.
