= Liolaemus vallecurensis =

Conservation status
- Near Threatened (IUCN 3.1)

Scientific classification
- Kingdom: Animalia
- Phylum: Chordata
- Class: Reptilia
- Order: Squamata
- Suborder: Iguania
- Family: Liolaemidae
- Genus: Liolaemus
- Species: L. vallecurensis

Binomial name
- Liolaemus vallecurensis Pereyra, 1992

Species of lizard

Liolaemus vallecurensis is a species of lizard in the family Iguanidae or the family Liolaemidae. The species is endemic to Argentina.
