= Liolaemus melanogaster =

Conservation status
- Least Concern (IUCN 3.1)

Scientific classification
- Kingdom: Animalia
- Phylum: Chordata
- Class: Reptilia
- Order: Squamata
- Suborder: Iguania
- Family: Liolaemidae
- Genus: Liolaemus
- Species: L. melanogaster

Binomial name
- Liolaemus melanogaster Laurent, 1998

Species of lizard

Liolaemus melanogaster is a species of lizard in the family Iguanidae. It is found in Peru.
