= Liolaemus jamesi =

Conservation status
- Least Concern (IUCN 3.1)

Scientific classification
- Kingdom: Animalia
- Phylum: Chordata
- Class: Reptilia
- Order: Squamata
- Suborder: Iguania
- Family: Liolaemidae
- Genus: Liolaemus
- Species: L. jamesi

Binomial name
- Liolaemus jamesi (Boulenger, 1891)

Synonyms
- Ctenoblepharis jamesi Boulenger, 1891; Liolaemus jamesi — Cei, 1979

Species of lizard

Liolaemus jamesi, also known commonly as James' tree iguana, James's tree iguana, and el jararanco de James in South American Spanish, is a species of lizard in the family Liolaemidae. The species is native to western South America. There are two recognized subspecies.

== Etymology ==
The specific name, jamesi, is in honor of British businessman Henry Berkeley James (1846–1892), who collected natural history specimens in Chile.

== Geographic range ==
L. jamesi is found in Bolivia and Chile.

== Habitat ==
The preferred natural habitat of L. jamesi is rocky areas of sandy desert, at altitudes of 3,300–4,700 m (10,800–15,400 ft).

== Behavior ==
L. jamesi is terrestrial.

== Diet ==
L. jamesi is omnivorous.

== Reproduction ==
The mode of reproduction of L. jamesi has been described as viviparous, and as ovoviviparous.

== Subspecies ==
Two subspecies are recognized as being valid, including the nominotypical subspecies.

- Liolaemus jamesi aymararum Veloso, Sallaberry, Navarro, Iturra, Valencia, Penna & Díaz, 1982
- Liolaemus jamesi jamesi (Boulenger, 1891)

Nota bene: A trinomial authority in parentheses indicates that the subspecies was originally described in a genus other than Liolaemus.
