= Liolaemus foxi =

Conservation status
- Least Concern (IUCN 3.1)

Scientific classification
- Kingdom: Animalia
- Phylum: Chordata
- Class: Reptilia
- Order: Squamata
- Suborder: Iguania
- Family: Liolaemidae
- Genus: Liolaemus
- Species: L. foxi

Binomial name
- Liolaemus foxi Núñez, Navarro & Veloso, 2000

Species of lizard

Liolaemus foxi, commonly known as Fox's lizard and la lagartija de Fox in Chilean Spanish, is a species of lizard in the family Liolaemidae. The species is endemic to Chile.

== Etymology ==
The specific name, foxi, is in honor of American herpetologist Stanley Forrest Fox.

== Geographic range ==
L. foxi is found in northern Chile, in Antofagasta Region.

== Habitat ==
The preferred natural habitat of L. foxi is sandy desert with rocky areas, at altitudes of 3,300–3,739 m (10,827–12,267 ft).

== Reproduction ==
L. foxi is ovoviviparous.
