= Liolaemus robustus =

Conservation status
- Near Threatened (IUCN 3.1)

Scientific classification
- Kingdom: Animalia
- Phylum: Chordata
- Class: Reptilia
- Order: Squamata
- Suborder: Iguania
- Family: Liolaemidae
- Genus: Liolaemus
- Species: L. robustus

Binomial name
- Liolaemus robustus Laurent, 1992

Species of lizard

Liolaemus robustus is a species of lizard in the family Liolaemidae. It is from Peru.
