= Sulawesi sailfin lizard =

There are two species of lizard named Sulawesi sailfin lizard, both native to Indonesia:

- Hydrosaurus microlophus
- Hydrosaurus celebensis
