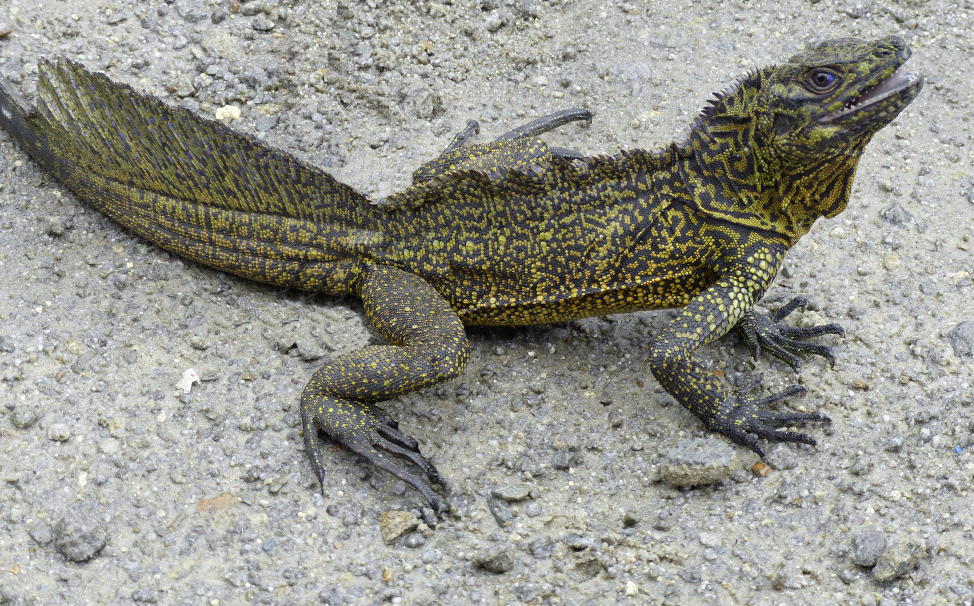
- Male on Ambon Island

Conservation status
- Least Concern (IUCN 3.1)

Scientific classification
- Kingdom: Animalia
- Phylum: Chordata
- Class: Reptilia
- Order: Squamata
- Suborder: Iguania
- Family: Agamidae
- Genus: Hydrosaurus
- Species: H. amboinensis

Binomial name
- Hydrosaurus amboinensis (Schlosser, 1768)

= Hydrosaurus amboinensis =

Species of lizard

The Moluccan sail-finned lizard or Ambon sailfin dragon (Hydrosaurus amboinensis) is a large agamid lizard native to Moluccas or Maluku Islands in Indonesia, growing to about one metre (3.3 ft) in length. It is often confused for being the largest of the sailfin dragons, but that title belongs to Hydrosaurus microlophus, with the second-largest of the sailfin dragons being Hydrosaurus celebensis.

The Amboina sail-finned lizard is found in wooded habitats near water in New Guinea and the central Moluccas. Although it has been reported from the Philippines and Sulawesi, a genetic study has shown that all in the former country (even southern ones, which have caused confusion in the past) are Philippine sailfin lizards H. pustulatus, while genetic and morphological studies have shown that individuals from the latter island belong to two separate species to which the names H. celebensis and H. microlophus are available. Adult male Amboina sail-finned lizards have outer edges of the eyes that are medium-dark clear blue and no nose crest, which are some of the features that separate them from the Sulawesi species.

Sailfin lizards are semiaquatic and able to run short distances across water using both their feet and tail for support, similar to the basilisks.
