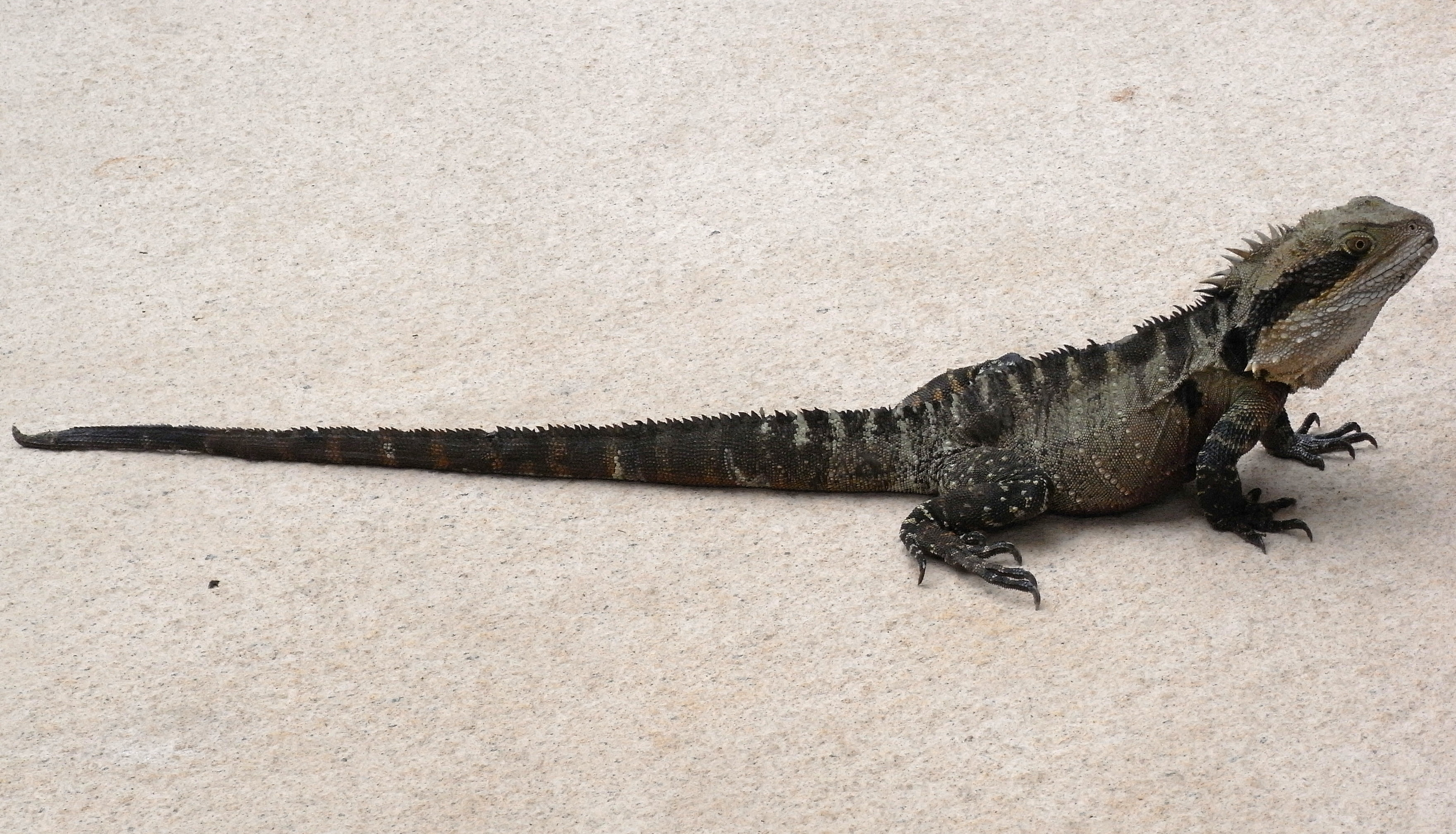
- I. l. lesueurii (eastern water dragon)
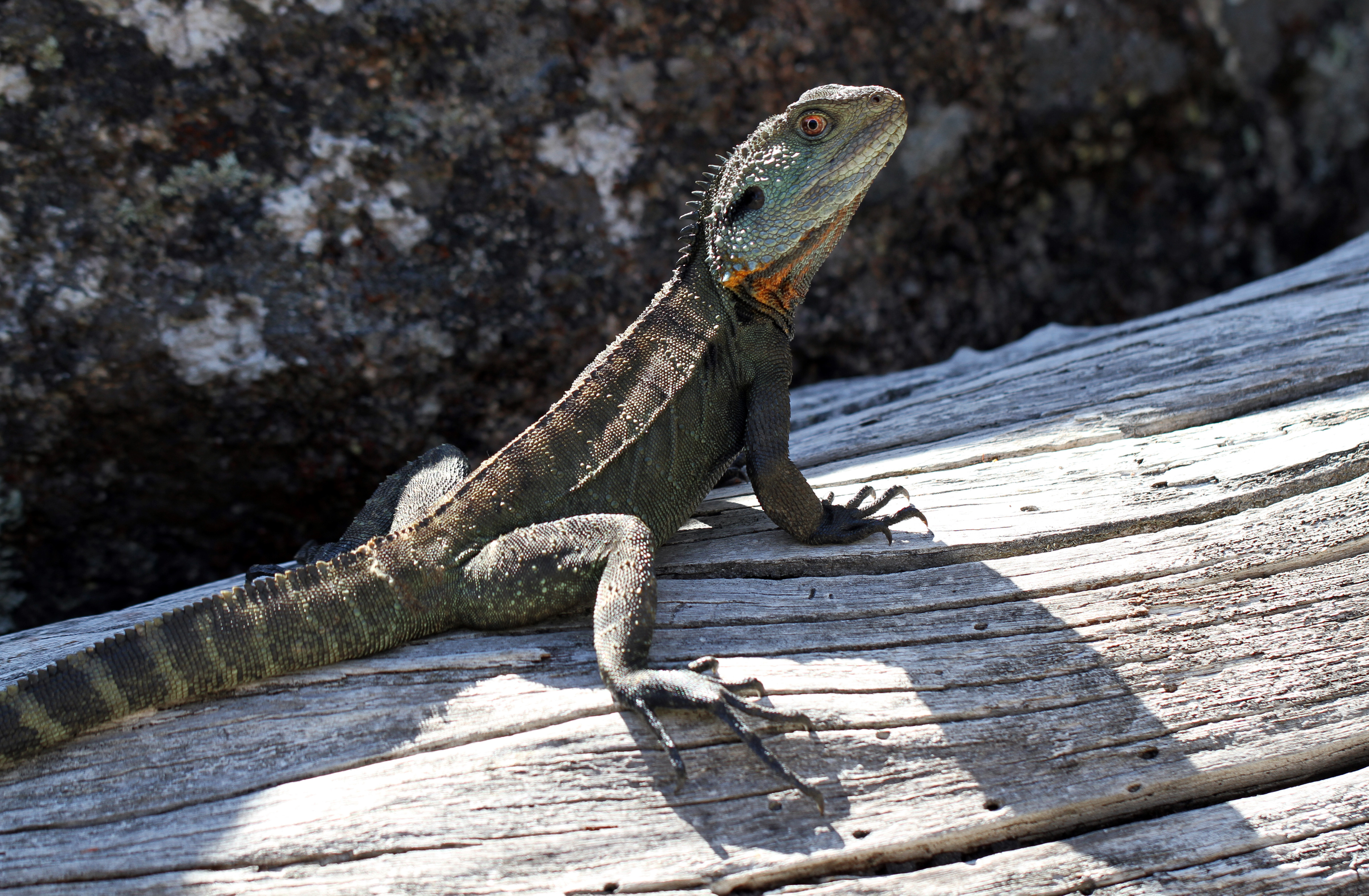
- I. l. howittii (Gippsland water dragon)

Conservation status
- Least Concern (IUCN 3.1)

Scientific classification
- Kingdom: Animalia
- Phylum: Chordata
- Class: Reptilia
- Order: Squamata
- Suborder: Iguania
- Family: Agamidae
- Genus: Intellagama; Wells & Wellington, 1985
- Species: I. lesueurii

Binomial name
- Intellagama lesueurii (Gray, 1831)

Subspecies
- Intellagama lesueurii lesueurii (Gray, 1831) eastern water dragon; Intellagama lesuerii howittii (F. McCoy, 1884) Gippsland water dragon

Synonyms
- List: Lophura lesueurii Gray, 1831; Istiurus lesueurii — A.M.C. Duméril & Bibron, 1837; Iguana panamatensis Fitzinger, 1843; Amphibolurus maculiferus Girard, 1857; Amphibolurus heterurus W. Peters, 1866; Amphibolurus branchialis De Vis, 1884; Physignathus lesueurii — Boulenger, 1885; Intellagama lesueurii — Wells & Wellington, 1985

= Australian water dragon =

Species of lizard

The Australian water dragon (Intellagama lesueurii), which includes the eastern water dragon (Intellagama lesueurii lesueurii) and the Gippsland water dragon (Intellagama lesueurii howittii) subspecies, is a semi aquatic agamid species native to eastern Australia from Victoria northwards to Queensland. There may be a small introduced population on the south-east coast of South Australia. The Gippsland water dragon is generally the more southern of the two subspecies and the more cold adapted and heat sensitive. Visually distinguishing the Gippsland water dragon from the Eastern water dragon is relatively easy, as long as their skin is reasonably clean and not stained from the water, as identification of the two subspecies depends largely on observable differences in colours and patterns.

The Gippsland water dragon may be distinguished by its green-blue colour, especially during the breeding season, when this overall colouration is quite distinct. Another key difference is the absence of a prominent dark stripe behind the eye in the Gippsland water dragon, which is characteristic of the Eastern water dragon. The gular region of the two subspecies is also quite different, with Intellagama l. howittii having orange-yellow streaked with darker striping, which is sometimes quite striking, particularly in mature males, whereas Intellagama l. lesueurii typically has a pale, unmarked throat that is sometimes immaculate white in mature males. The belly and chest of Intellagama l. howittii are also quite different to Intellagama l. lesueurii, usually being blackish green, especially in mature males, and the limbs are often quite dark, sometimes even black. Whereas in Intellagama l. lesueurii the chest and belly are usually bright to deep red, particularly in mature males. Intellagama l. lesueurii also have relatively strong dark transverse bars across the back, whereas these dark bars are often much reduced in the Gippsland water dragon.

== Etymology ==
The specific name, lesueurii, is in honor of French naturalist Charles Alexandre Lesueur.

== Taxonomy and systematics ==
The species was first described by John Edward Gray in 1831 as Lophura lesueurii, from a specimen collected by Lesueur & Péron at "Parramatta" or "Port Jackson". Gray listed three species of Lophura: Cuvier's (Lophura Cuvierii Gray), Lesueur's (Lophura Lesueurii Gray), and beautiful (Lophura Concinna Gray, Physignathus Concinnus (Note: Cuvier's original spelling was Physignathus cocincinus, after the type locality "cocincine" (Cochin-China).) Cuvier).

In 1845, Gray separated Physignathus (P. concinnus & P. Lesueurii) from Lophura (L. amboinensis (Note: The name Lophura was already used for a genus of pheasants, the current name is Hydrosaurus amboinensis.) & L. Shawii (Note: Shawii now considered to be conspecific with amboinensis.)). The Australian water dragon remained in Physignathus along with the Asian water dragon P. cocincinus until Wells and Wellington published the genus Intellagama in 1985.

The subspecies howitii was described by Frederick McCoy in 1884 as "the Gippsland water lizard". According to his description, it differs from the Queensland subspecies in the proportions of the head and the supra-ocular scales. Its sub-specific epithet commemorates geologist and magistrate Alfred William Howitt, who collected three specimens from the upper reaches of the Buchan River and sent them to McCoy. Two of the specimens cannot be located, the third is D1822 in the collection of the National Museum of Victoria, which was designated the lectotype by Coventry in 1970.

== Description ==
Australian water dragons have long powerful limbs and claws for climbing, a long muscular laterally-compressed tail for swimming, and prominent nuchal and vertebral crests. (A nuchal crest is a central row of spikes at the base of the head. These spikes continue down the spine, getting smaller as they reach the base of the tail.)

Including their tails, which comprise about two-thirds of their total length, adult females grow to about 60 cm (2 feet) long, and adult males can grow slightly longer than one metre (39 inches) and weigh about 1 kg. Males show bolder colouration and have larger heads than females. Colour is less distinct in juveniles.

=== Species variation ===
The Australian water dragon is the only species of the genus Intellagama.

There are two subspecies; Intellagama lesueurii lesueurii (eastern water dragon) and Intellagama lesueurii howittii (Gippsland water dragon). The nominate subspecies Intellagama lesueurii lesueurii has a dark band behind its eye and an essentially un-patterned throat that tends towards white and is often immaculate in adult males. Whereas the subspecies Intellagama lesueurii howittii lacks the dark stripe behind the eye and has a patterned throat, which is lightly patterned in females but boldly patterned and coloured in adult males. This patterning usually consists of a dark stripe on either side of its throat, and blotched with orange, yellow or blue towards the centre of the throat. Both subspecies are light greenish grey in overall colour (greener in I. l. howittii), with darker bands running across their back, tail and legs. The water dragon can slowly change skin colour to aid its camouflage. The skin will shed during periods of growth and seasonally to reveal brighter colours in Spring that may aid breeding success.

== Behaviour ==
Head-bobbing behaviour

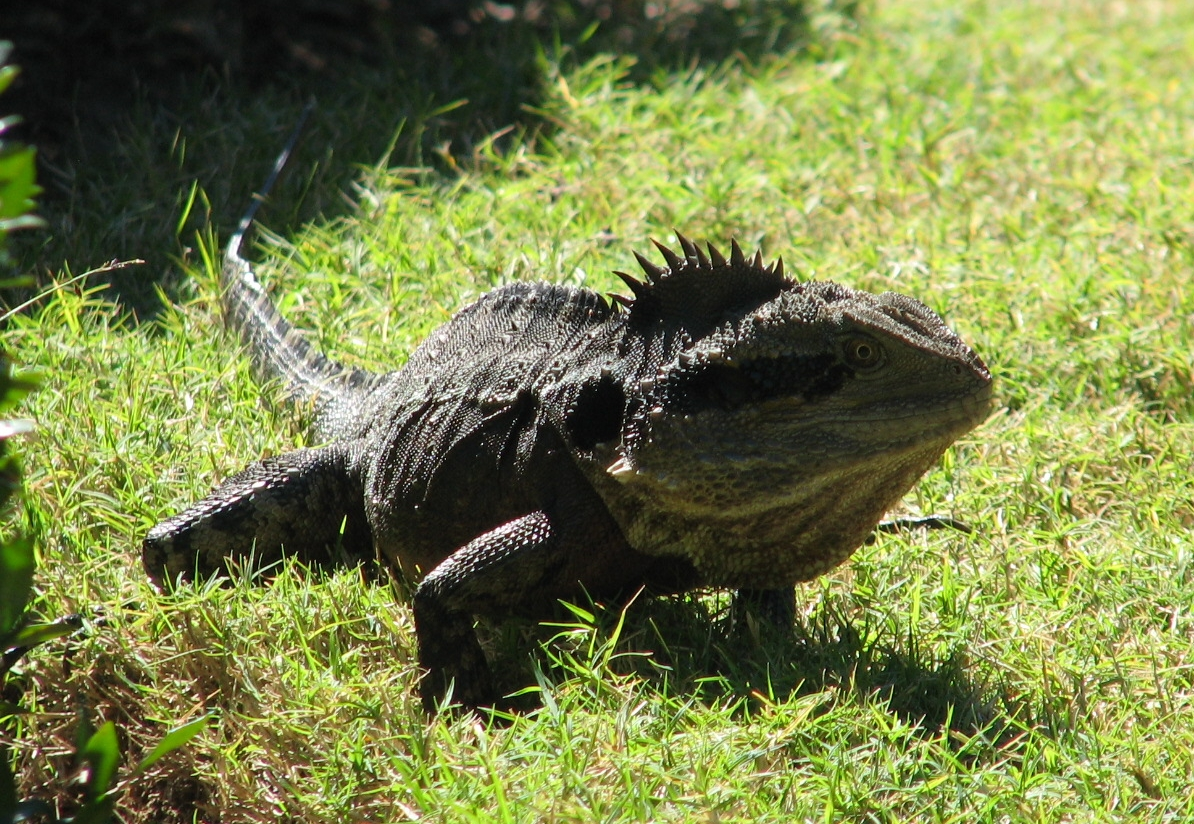
Eastern water dragon

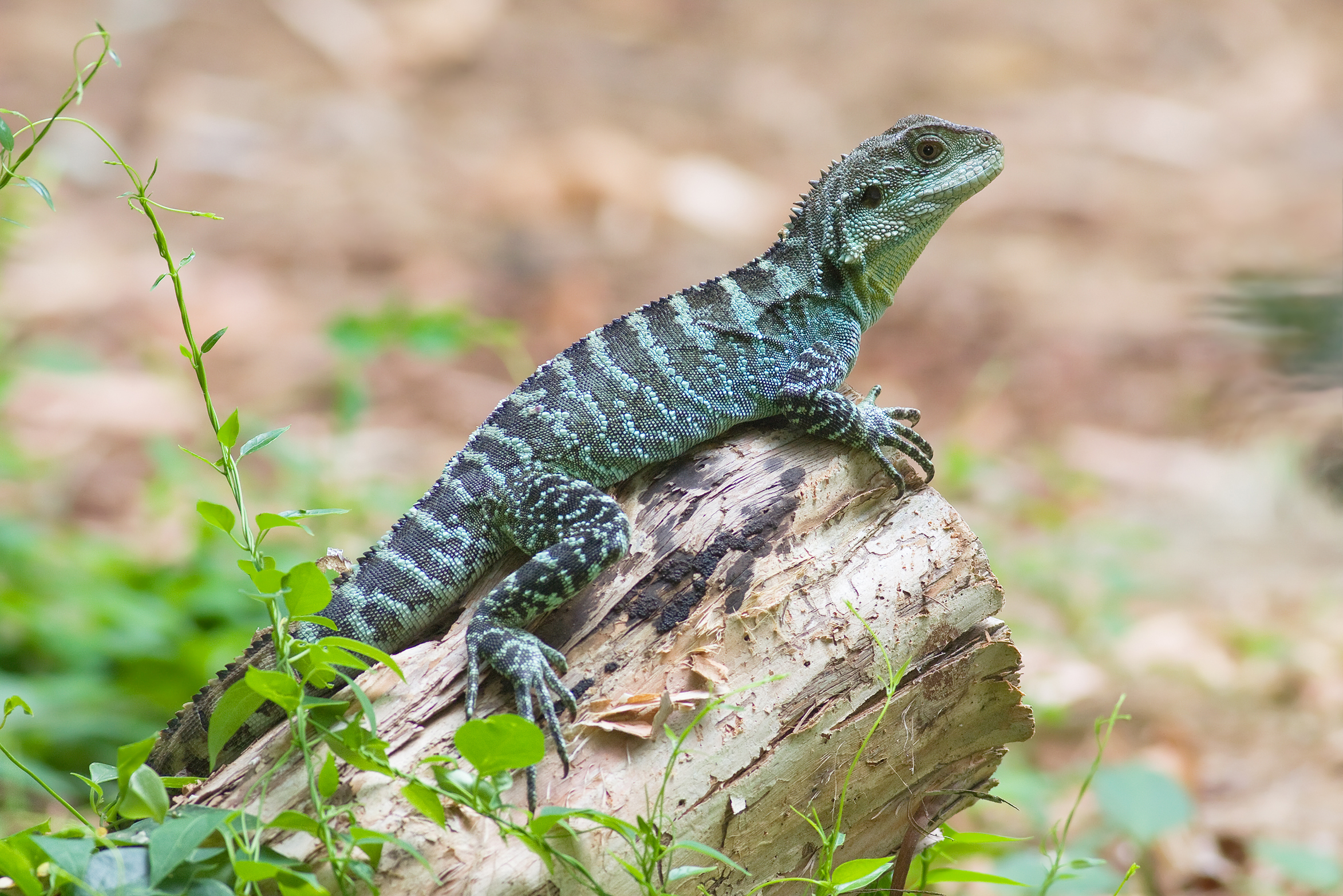
Intellagama lesueurii howitti, Gippsland water dragon basking in Canberra

Australian water dragons are extremely shy in the wild, but readily adapt to continual human presence in suburban parks and gardens. They are fast runners and strong climbers. When faced with a potential predator, they seek cover in thick vegetation, or drop from an overhanging branch into water. They are able to swim totally submerged, and rest on the bottom of shallow creeks or lakes for up to 90 minutes, to avoid detection.

Both males and females display typical agamid behaviour such as basking, arm-waving and head-bobbing. Fast arm-waving signals dominance, while slow arm-waving signals submission. Males are territorial, and in areas of higher population density, males exhibit displays of aggression toward other males including posturing, chasing and fighting.

=== Breeding ===
Australian water dragons living in cooler Australian climates enter brumation over winter. During spring, usually in early October, the female excavates a burrow about 10–15 cm (3.9–5.9 in) deep and lays between 6 and 18 eggs. The nest is usually in sandy or soft soil, in an area open to sun. When the mother has laid the eggs, she backfills the chamber with soil and scatters loose debris over it. Australian water dragons exhibit temperature dependent sex determination; the sex of the hatchlings is determined by the temperature of the nest site.

When the young are hatched, they stay near the entrance of the burrow for some time before leaving home. When they finally leave the nest, they tend to group together away from the adult population.

== Habitat ==
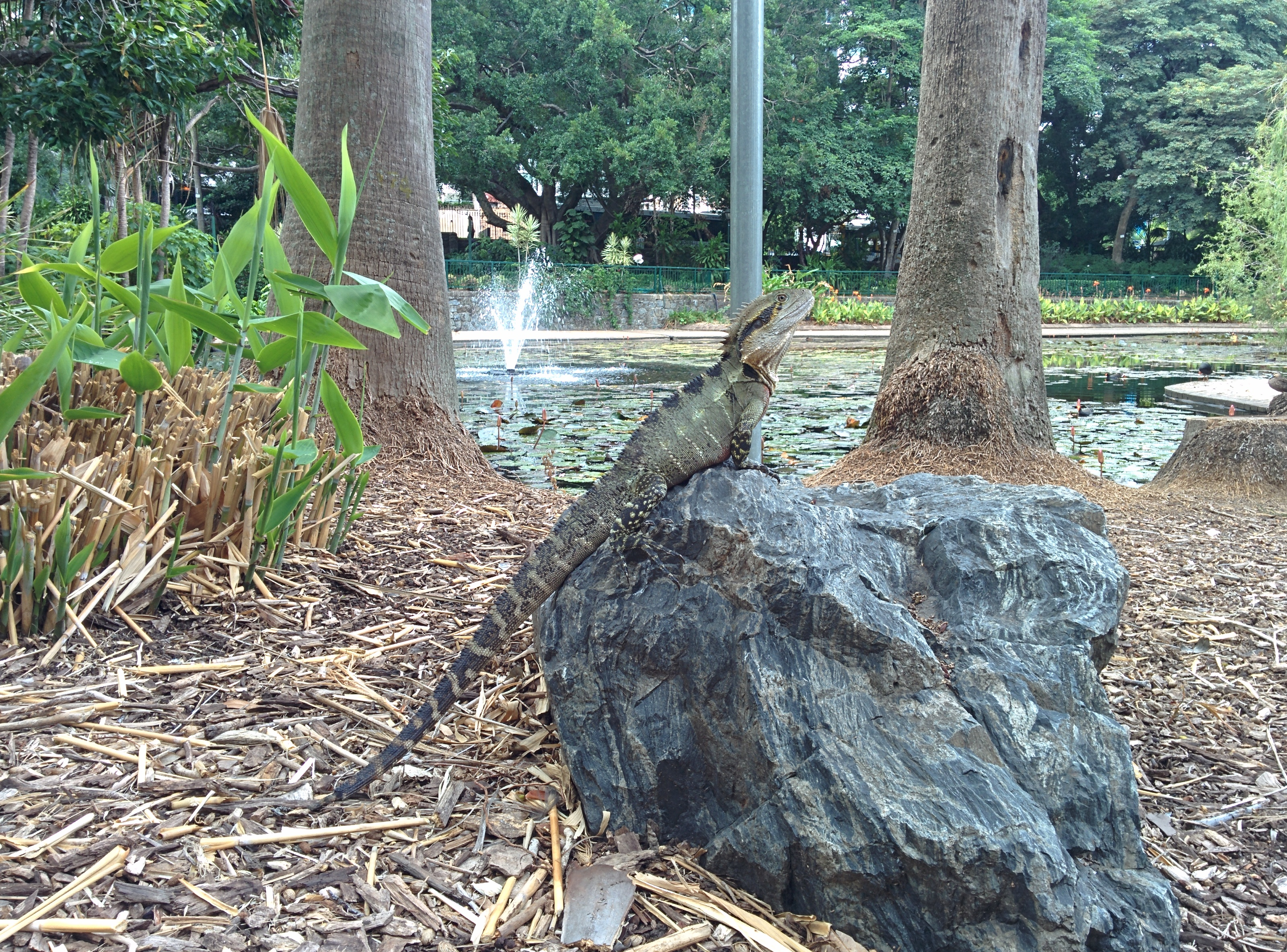
Basking water dragon in Brisbane's City Botanic Gardens.

As its common name suggests, the Australian water dragon is associated with water and is semi-aquatic. It can be found near creeks, rivers, lakes, and other water bodies that have basking sites such as overhanging branches or rocks in open or filtered sun. The species is very common in the rainforest section of Brisbane Botanic Gardens, Mount Coot-tha in Queensland, and a monument has been built to them there. There is also a significant population in Brisbane's Roma Street Parklands.

There are anecdotal reports of a small colony living on the Sixth Creek in the Forest Range area of South Australia, hundreds of kilometers outside their natural range, which were probably introduced there during the 1980s by a local reptile enthusiast.

== Predators, threats and diet ==
Australian water dragons are prey to carnivorous birds, snakes (such as brown tree snakes, common death adders, lowland copperheads, red-bellied black snakes, and eastern brown snakes), cats, dogs, and foxes. Nestlings and smaller juvenile water dragons are vulnerable to predation by kookaburras, currawongs, butcherbirds and other carnivorous birds. They are also prone to becoming road kill due to the attraction of warm bitumen and concrete for basking. The Australian water dragon's diet depends on its size. Juveniles and yearlings tend to feed on spiders and small insects such as ants, crickets, and caterpillars. When they get bigger, so does their prey. An adult diet includes small rodents, such as baby mice, other reptiles, frogs, fish, crabs, yabbies, molluscs, worms and eggs, although insects are still the most commonly consumed. Types of vegetation reportedly consumed include figs, lilly-pilly fruits, berries, and other fruits and flowers.

== Gallery ==
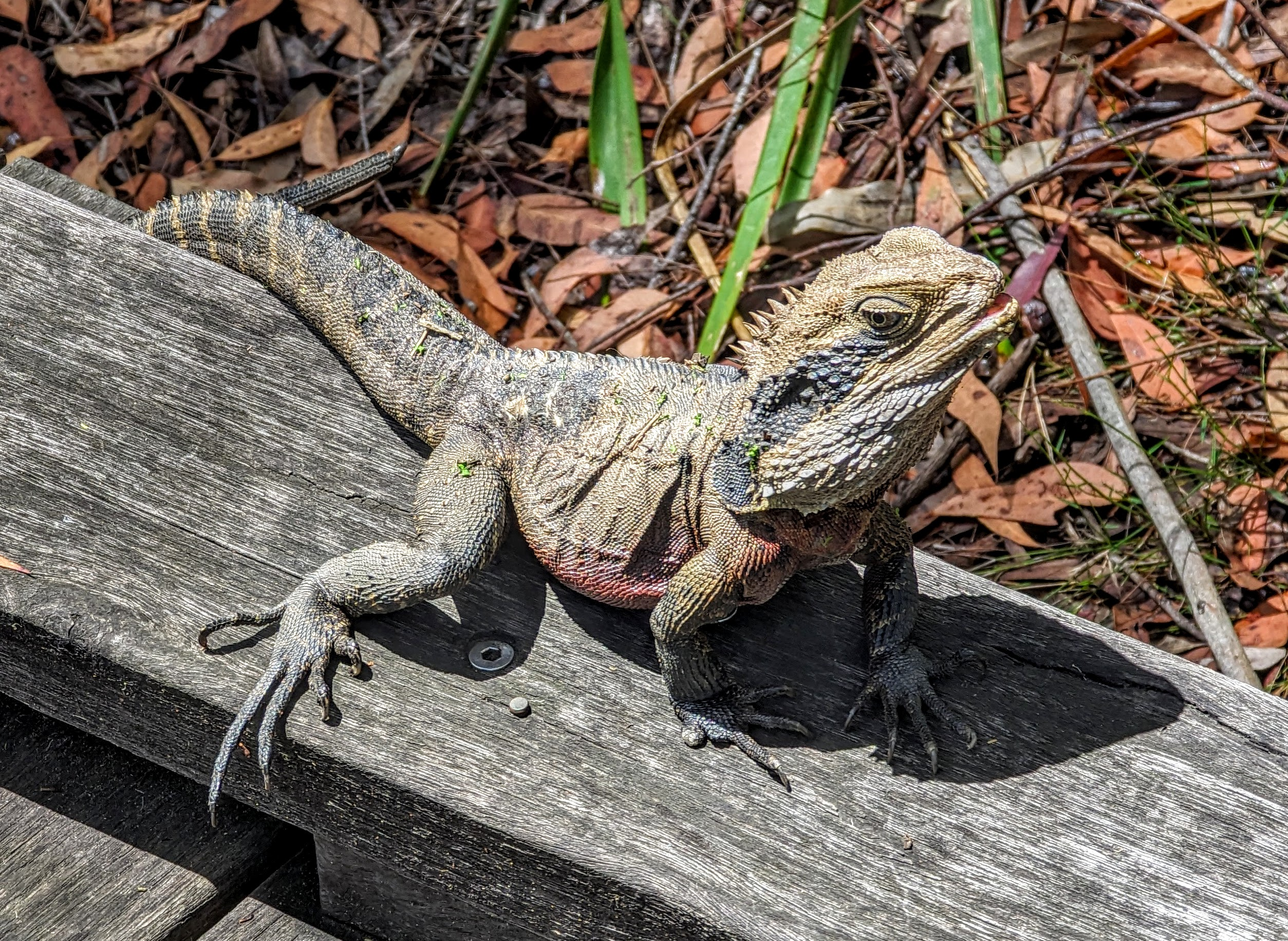
Eastern water dragon (I. l. lesueurii) at Lane Cove National Park

Australian water dragon, Brisbane

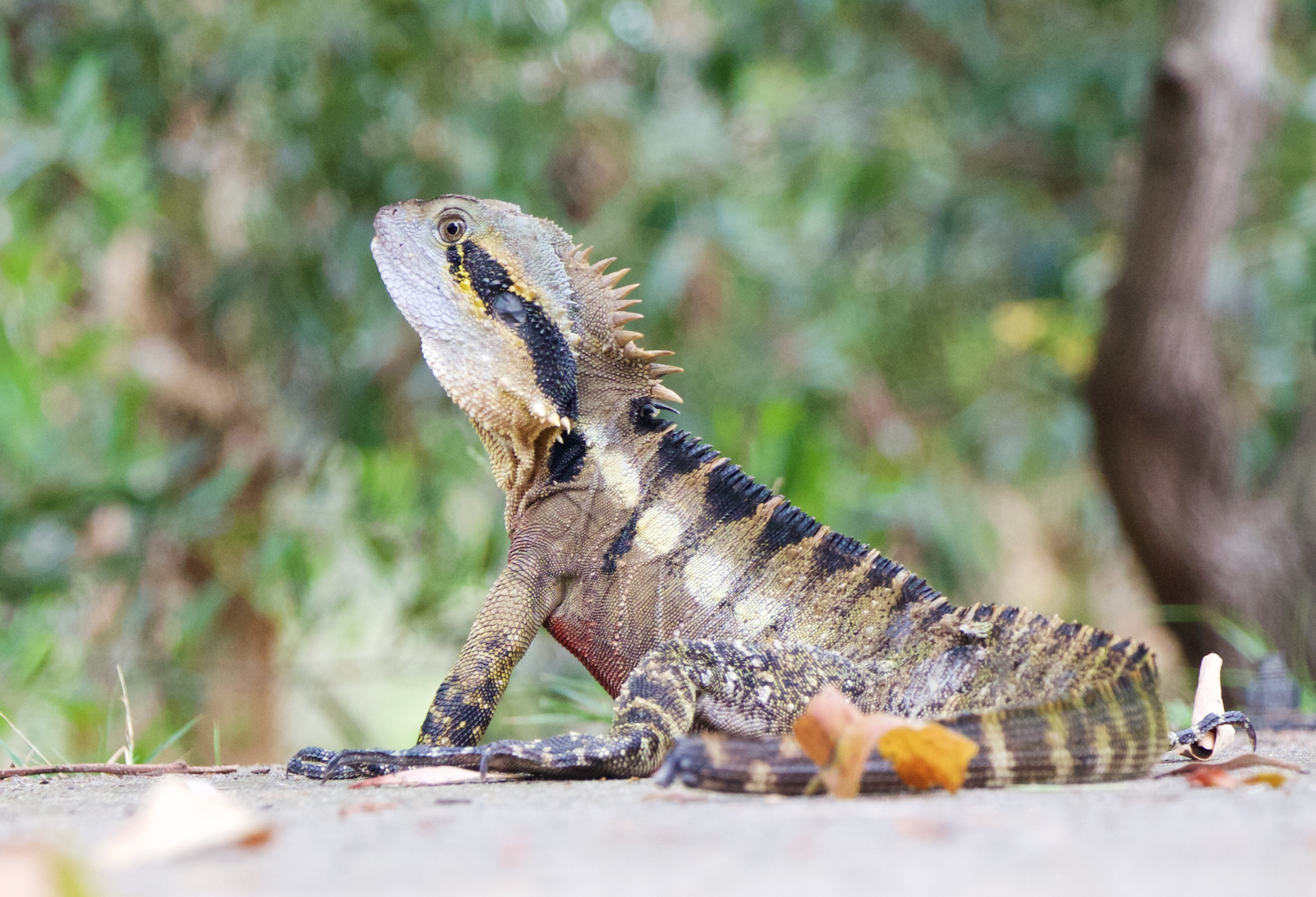
I. l. lesueurii (eastern water dragon) at Kirra, Queensland

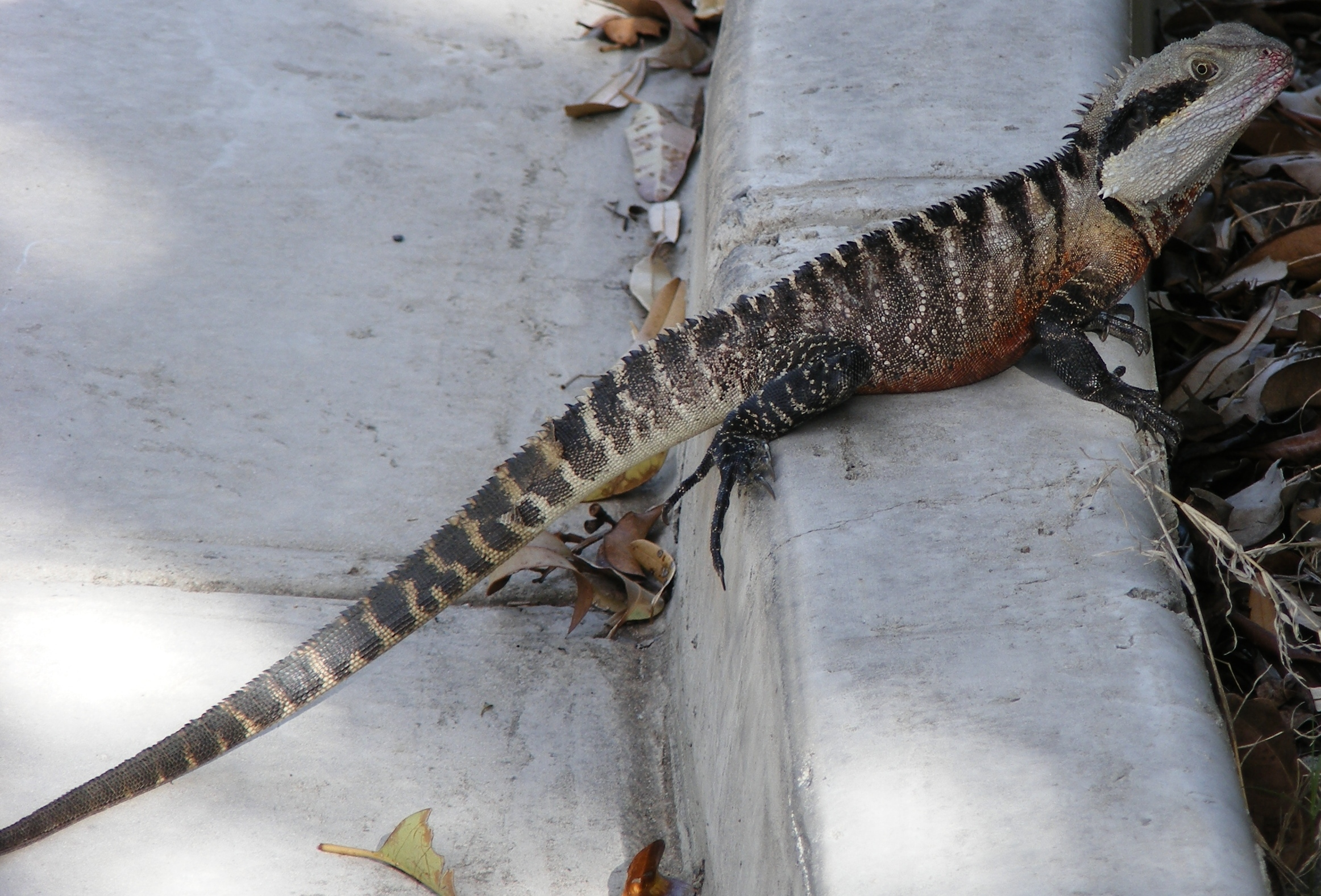
I. l. lesueurii (eastern water dragon)

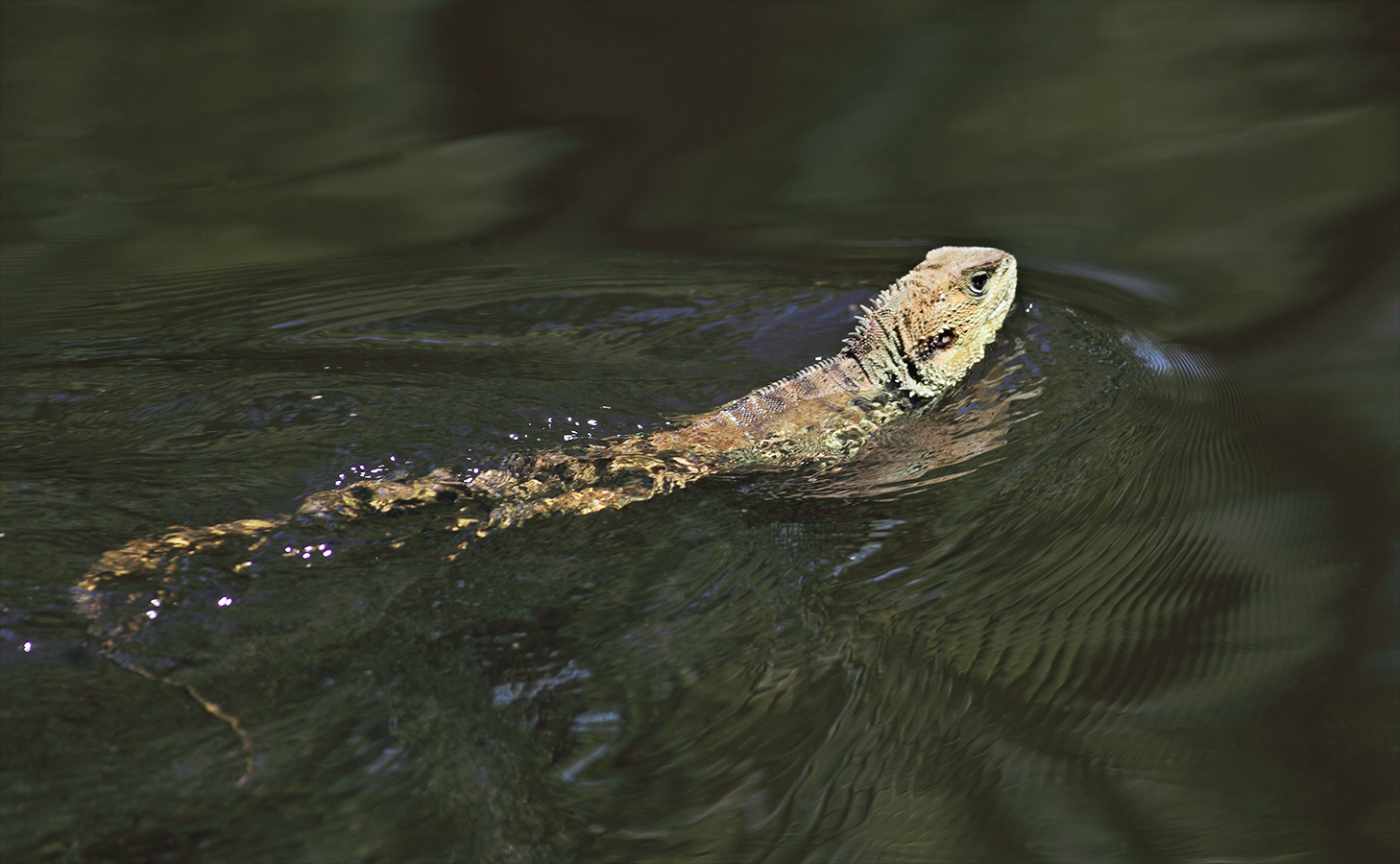
Swimming across river in Melbourne

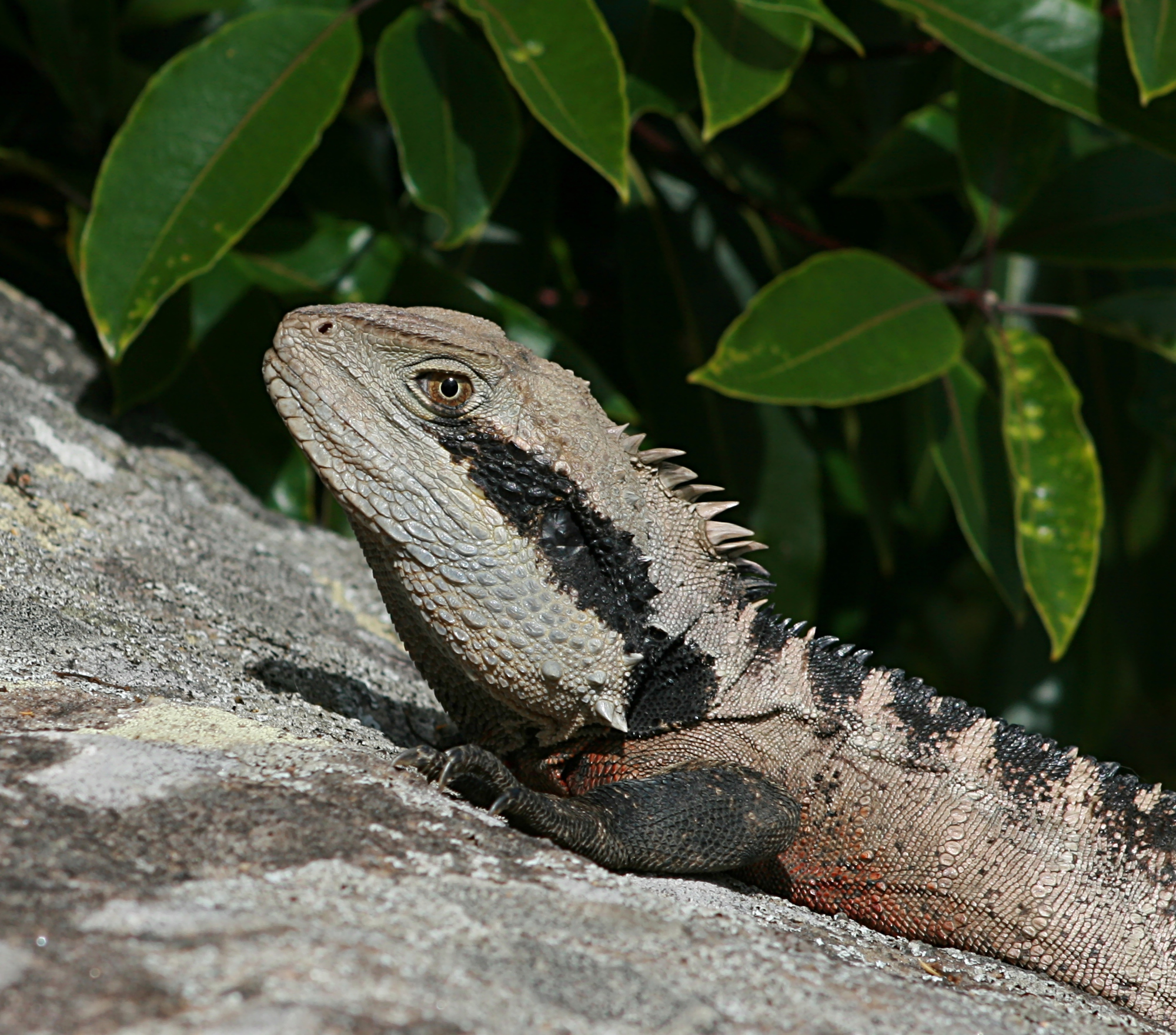
Head detail of the eastern subspecies

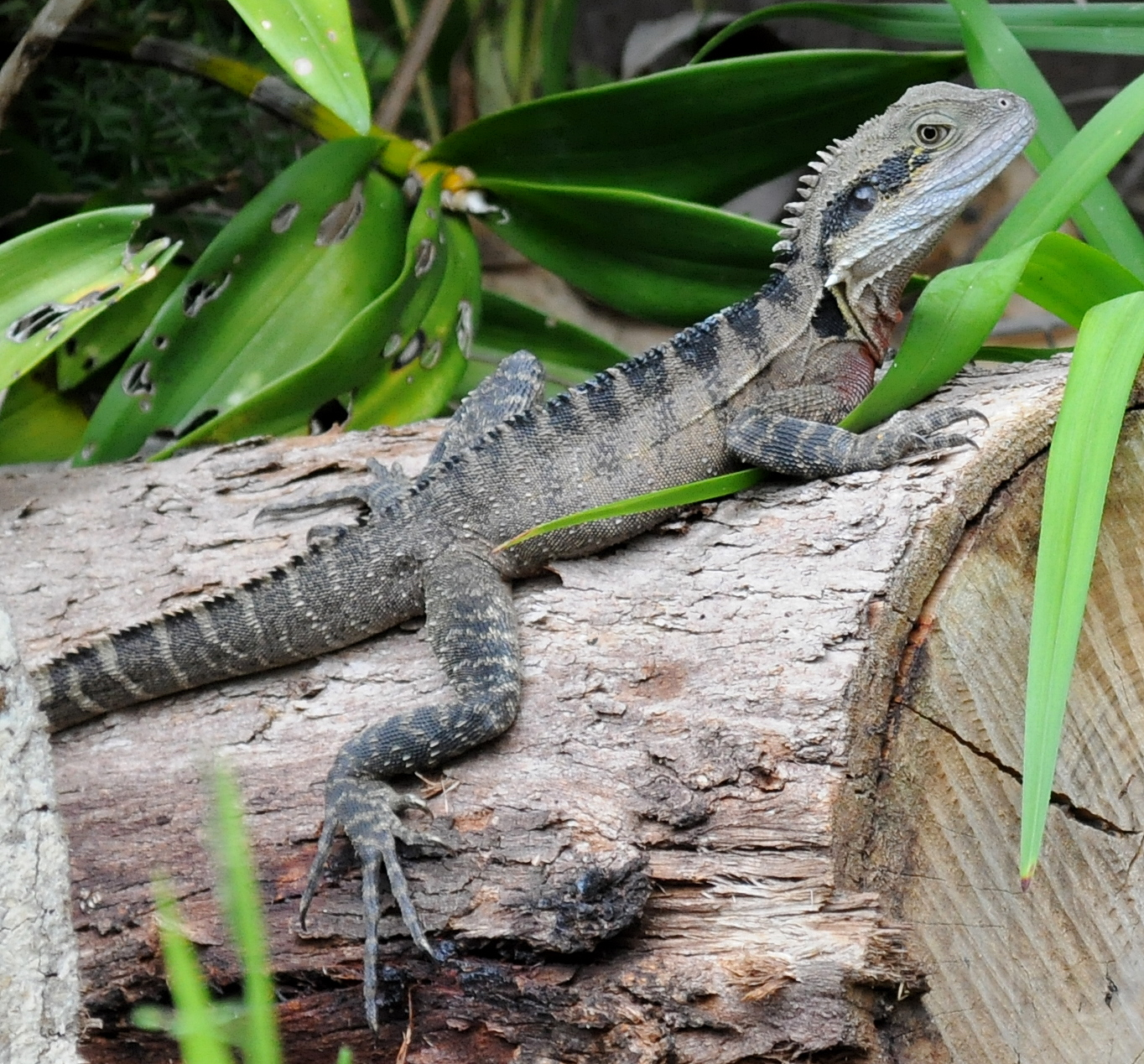
I. l. lesueurii (eastern water dragon) basking on a log in suburban Sydney

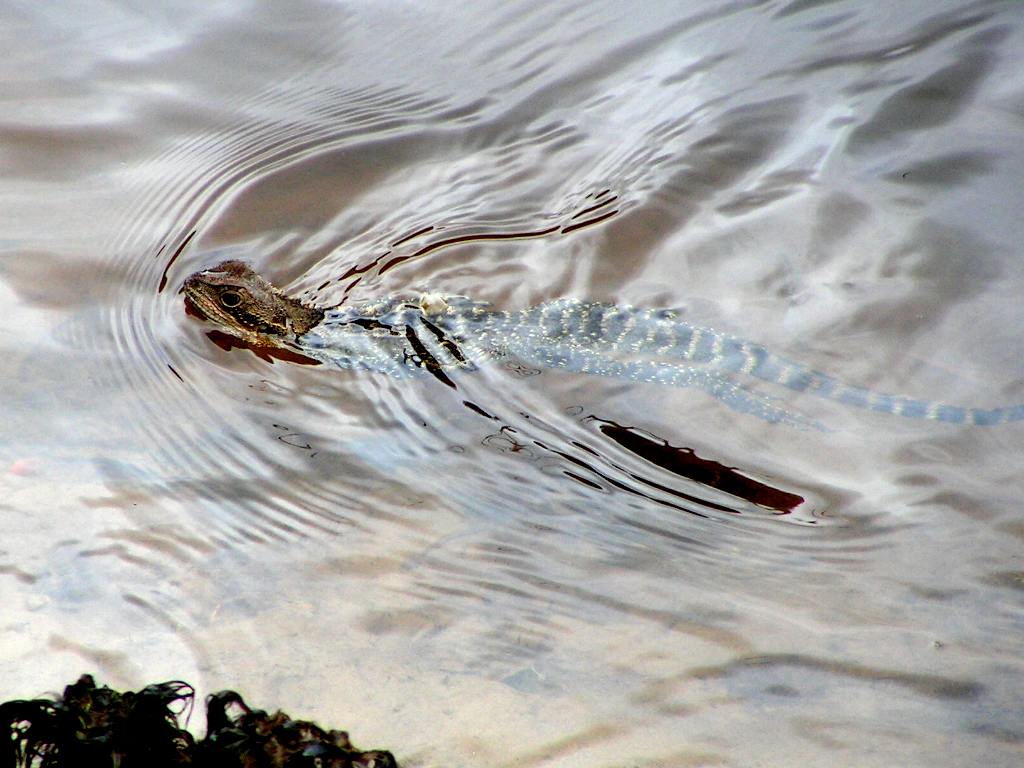
I. l. lesueurii swimming, Shoalhaven River, New South Wales

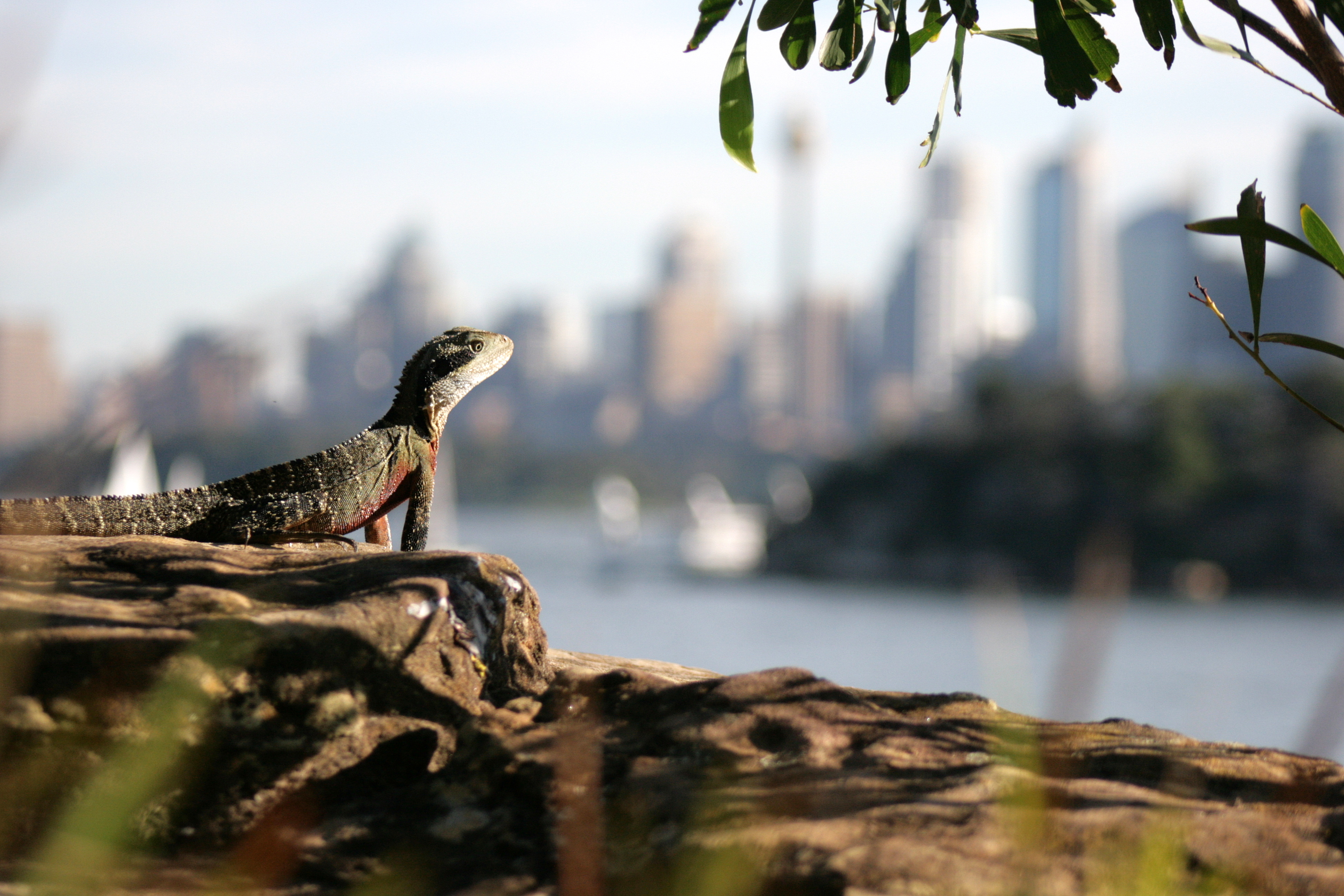
Australian water dragon surveying Sydney Harbour

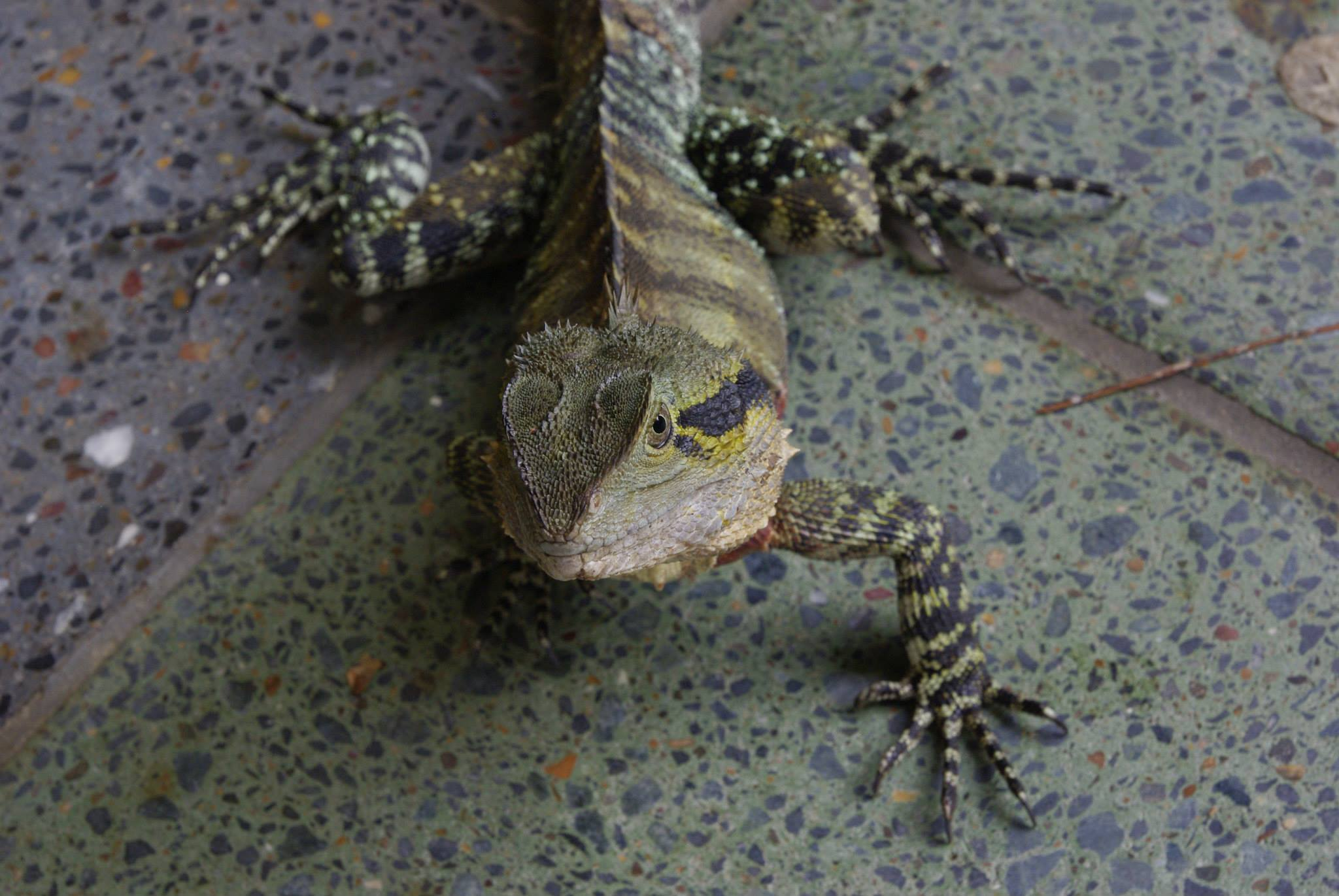
Eastern water dragon at Brisbane Botanic Gardens

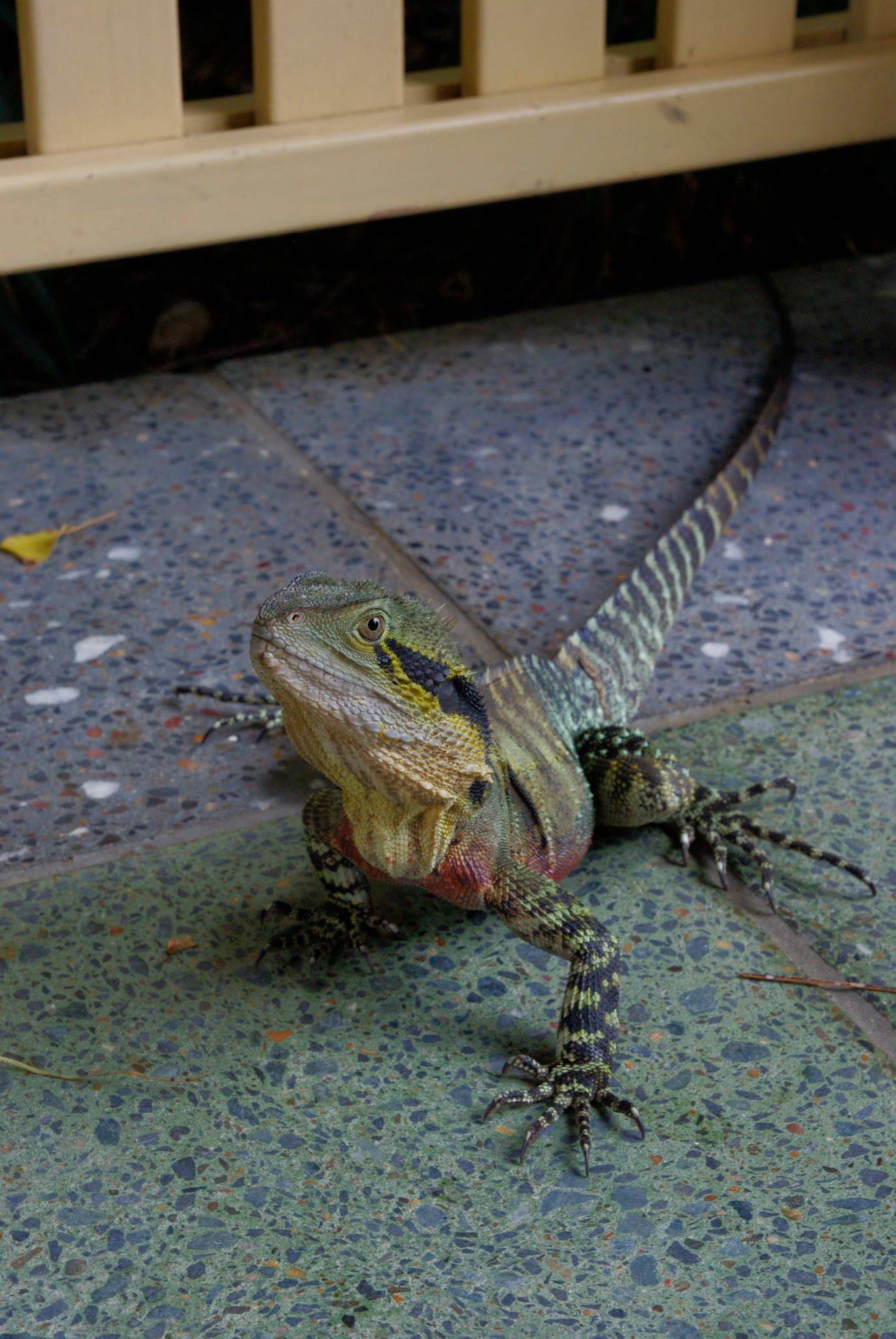
Eastern water dragon at Brisbane Botanic Gardens

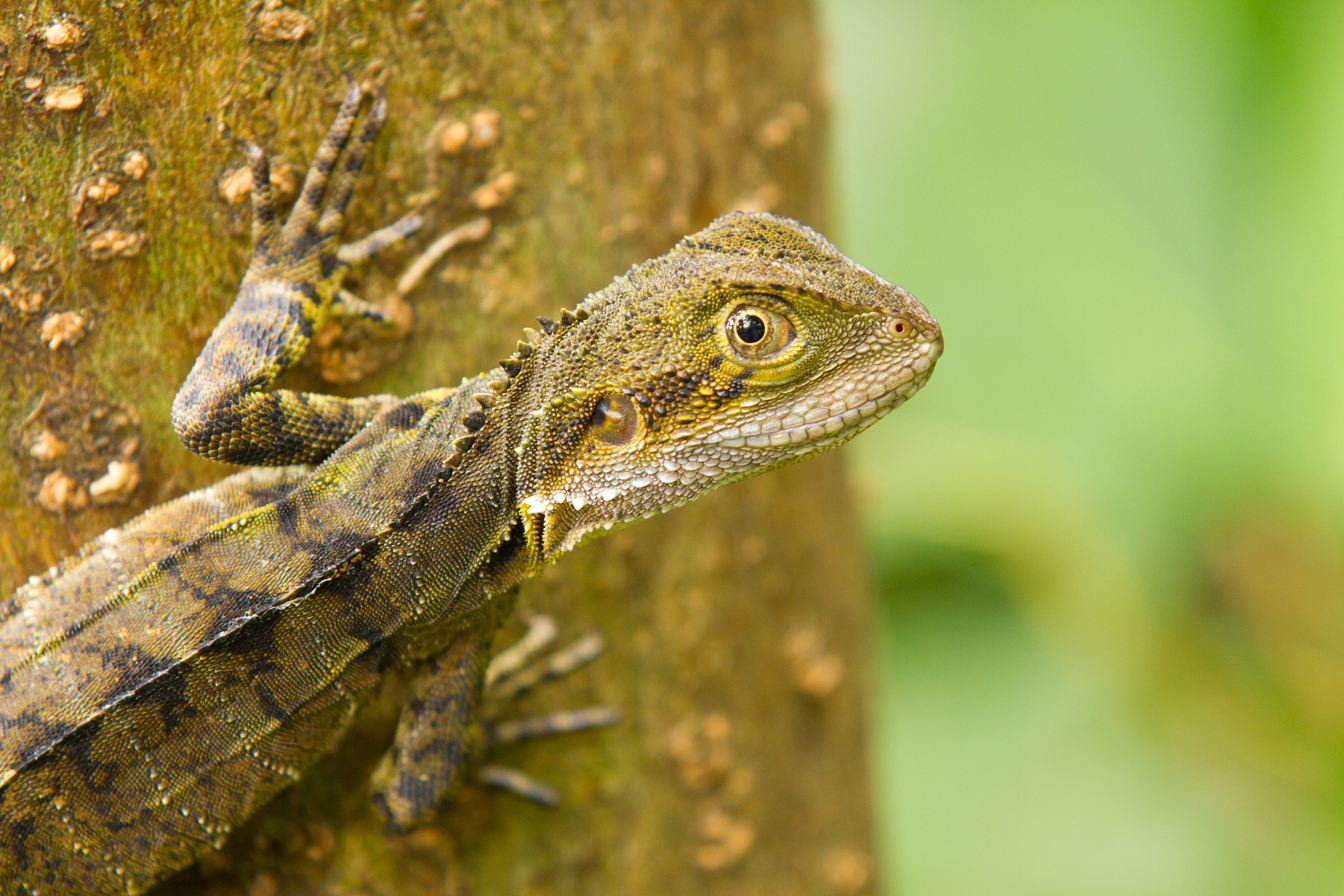
Juvenile eastern water dragon in Roma Street Parkland, Brisbane, Queensland, Australia

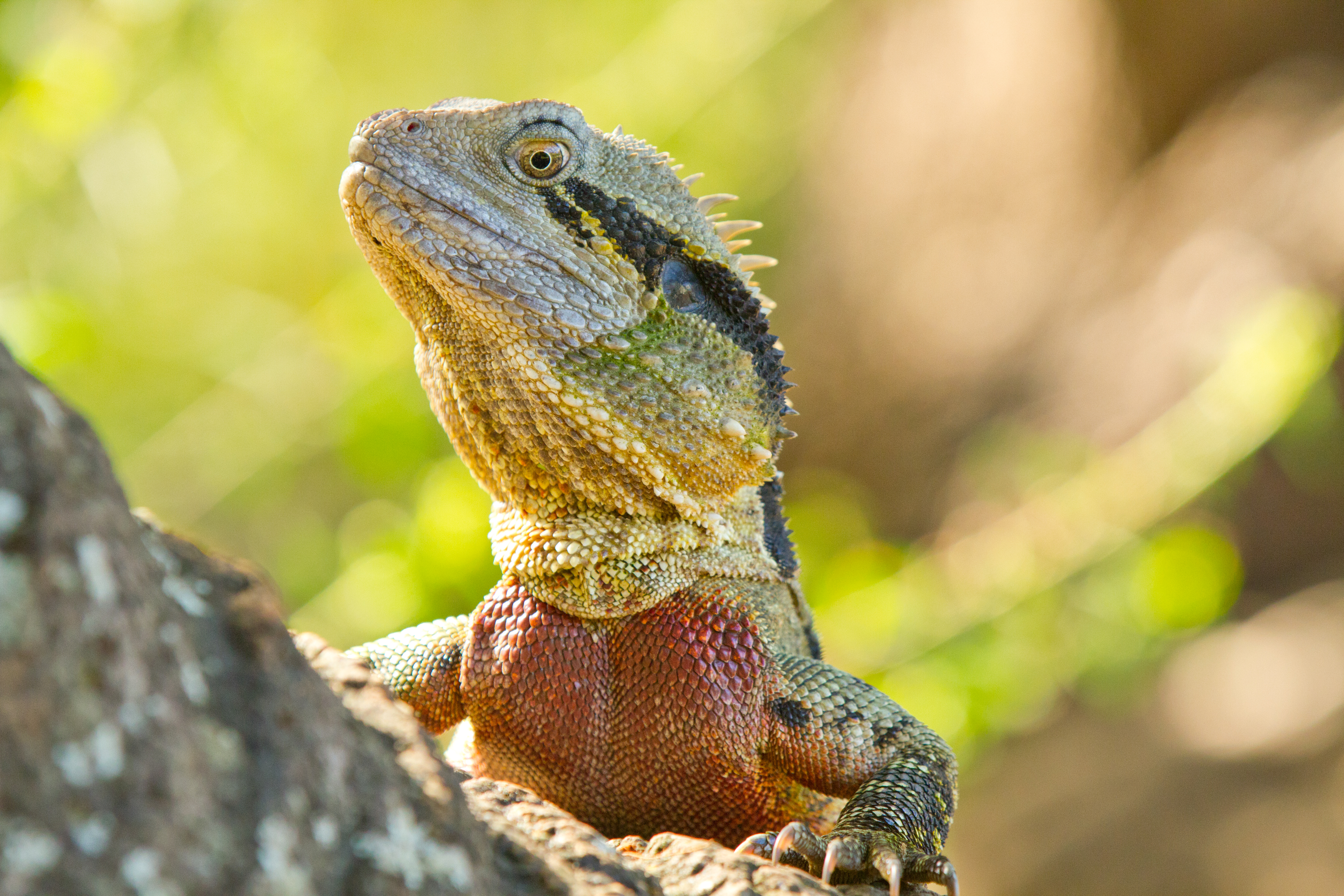
Eastern water dragon in Brisbane Botanical Gardens

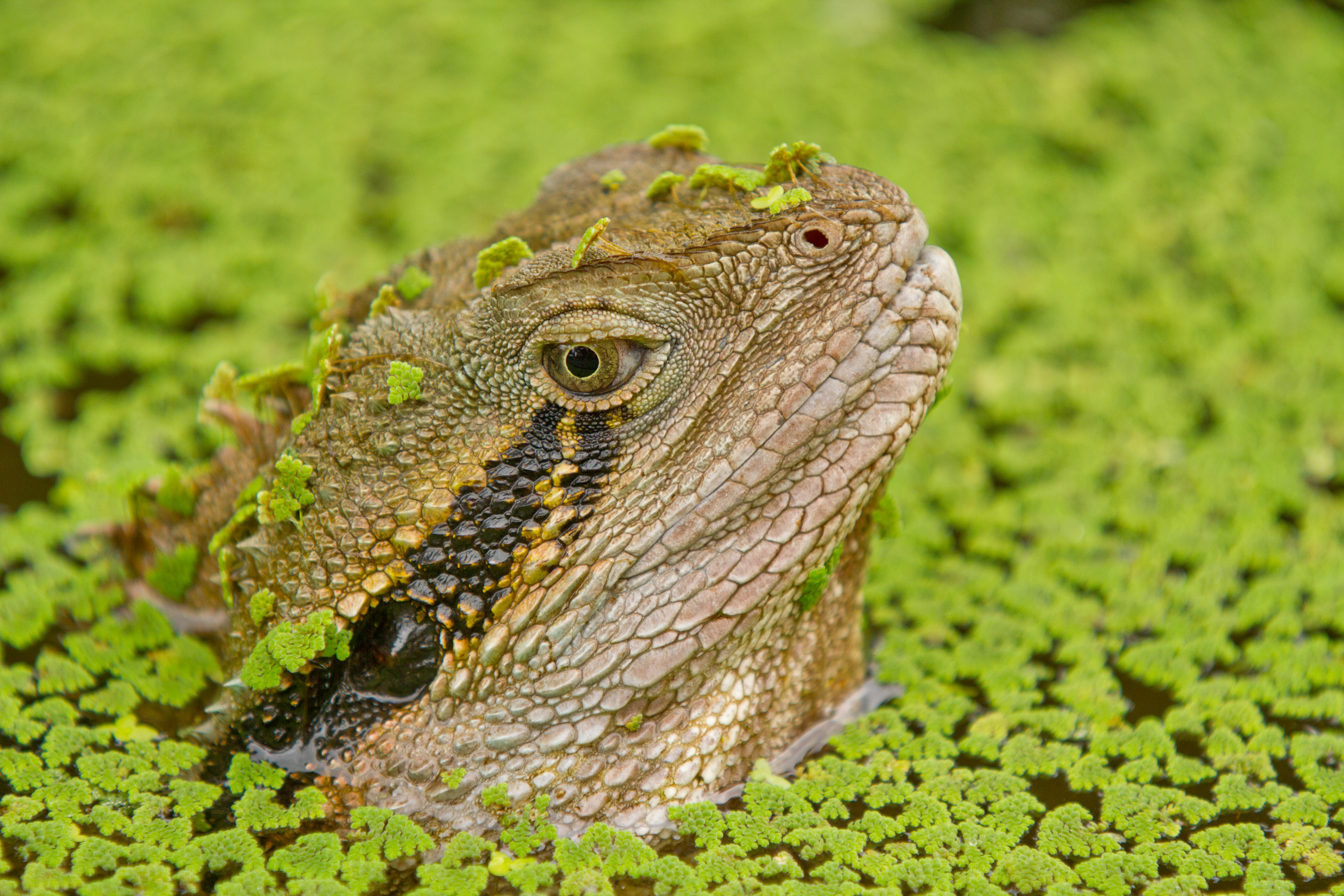
Head of an eastern water dragon poking out of a pond in Brisbane Botanical Gardens

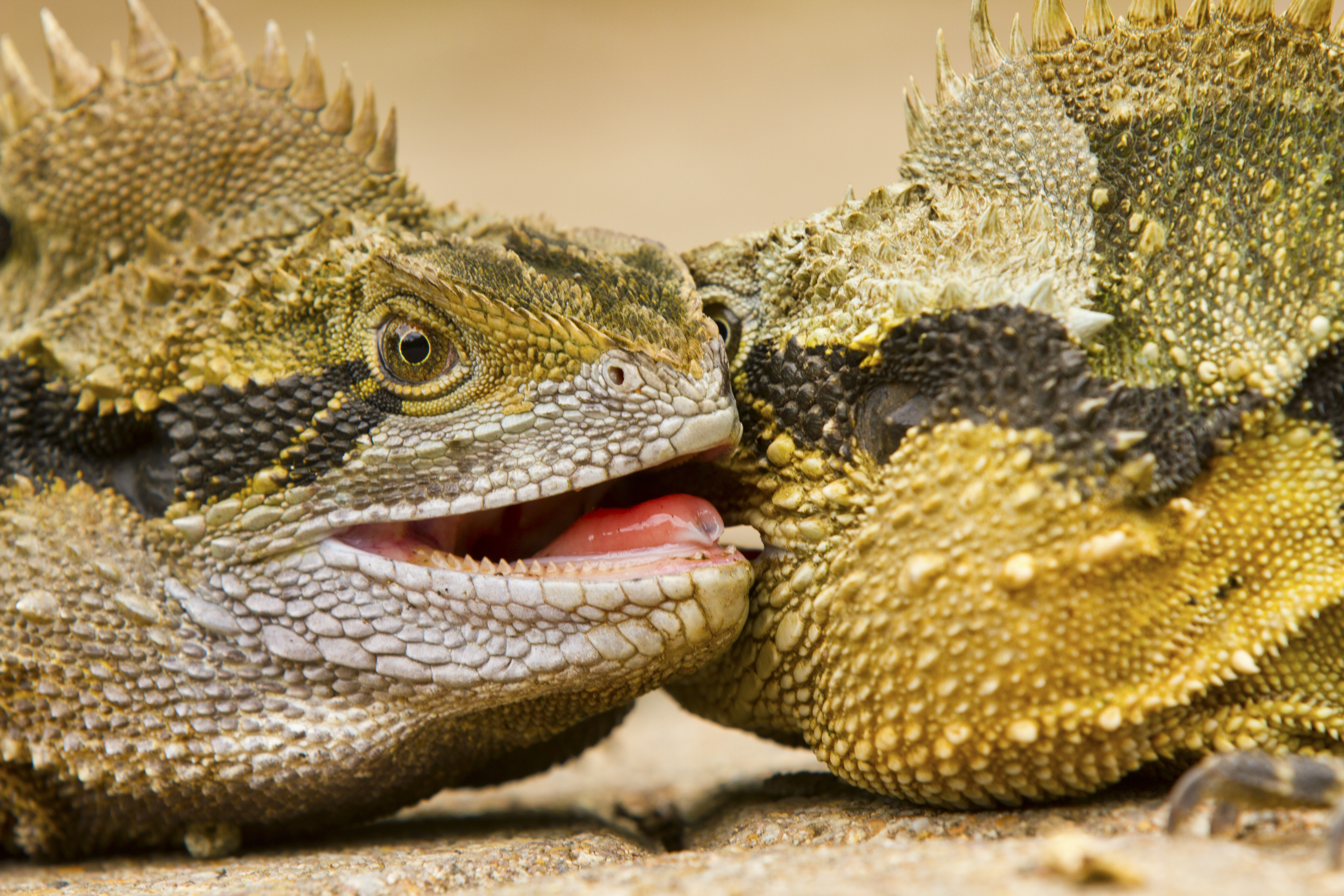
Two male Australian eastern water dragons (I. l. lesueurii ) fighting.

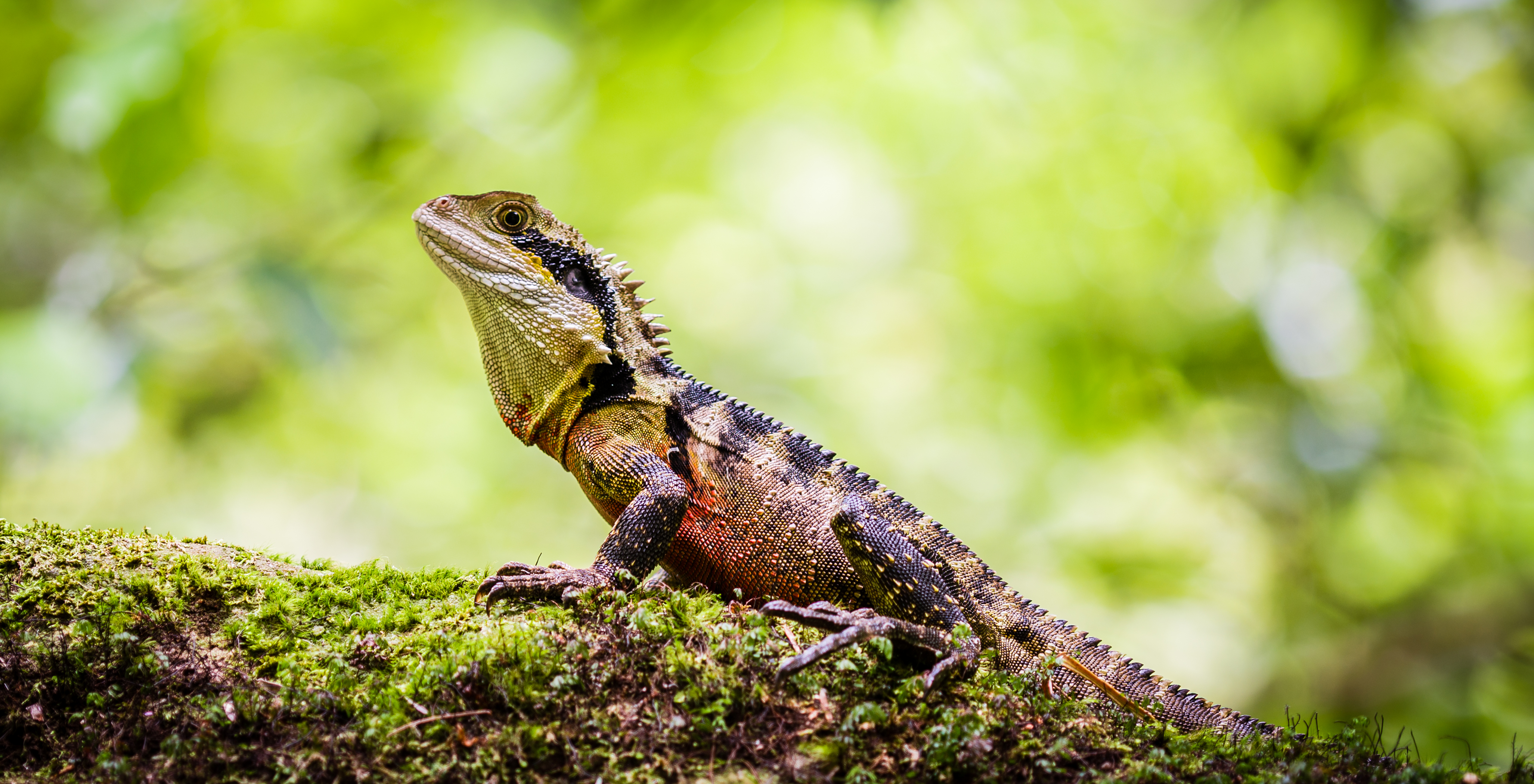
Australian eastern water dragon basking in the sun at Blue Mountains (New South Wales)

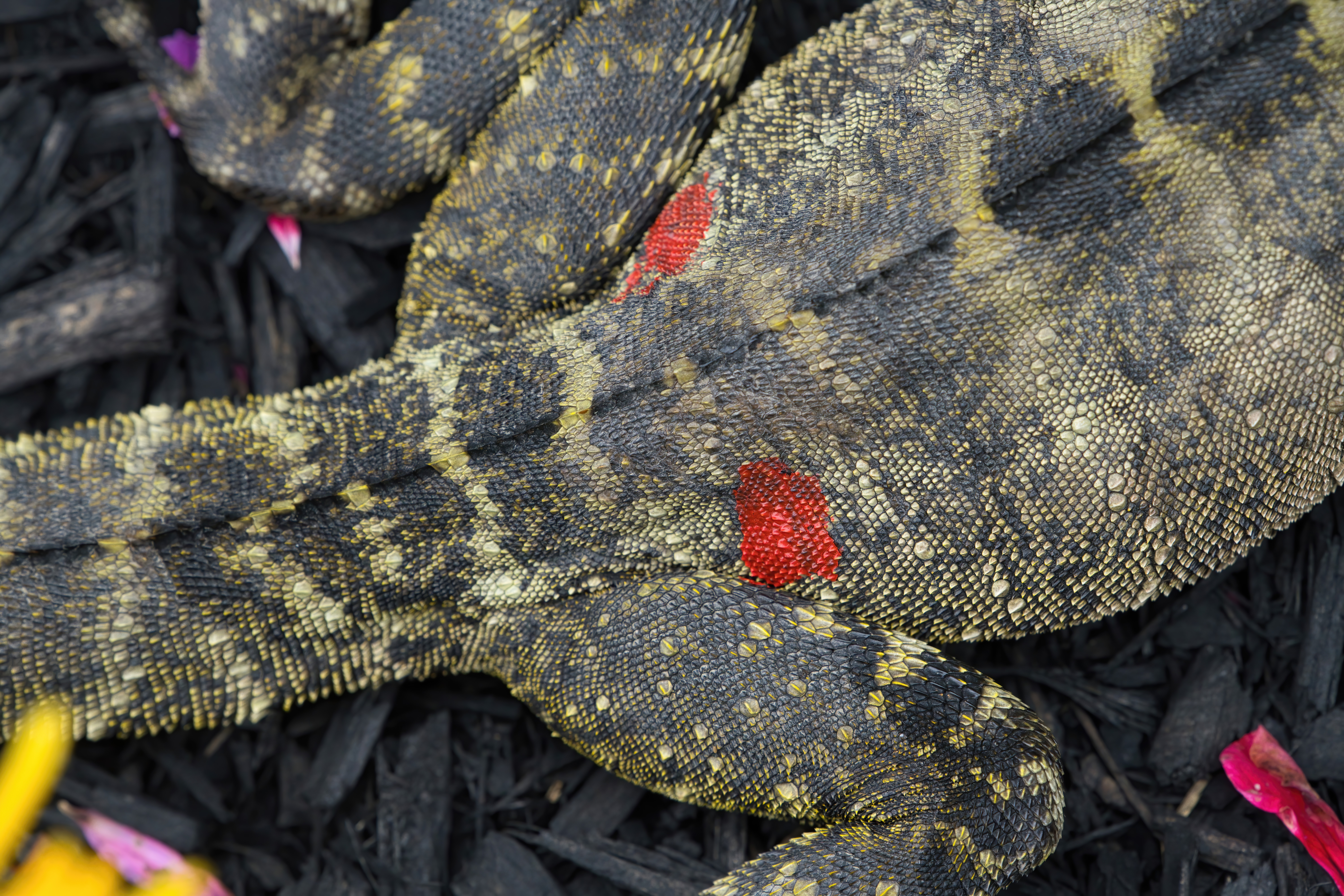
A water dragon that has been marked for research purposes.

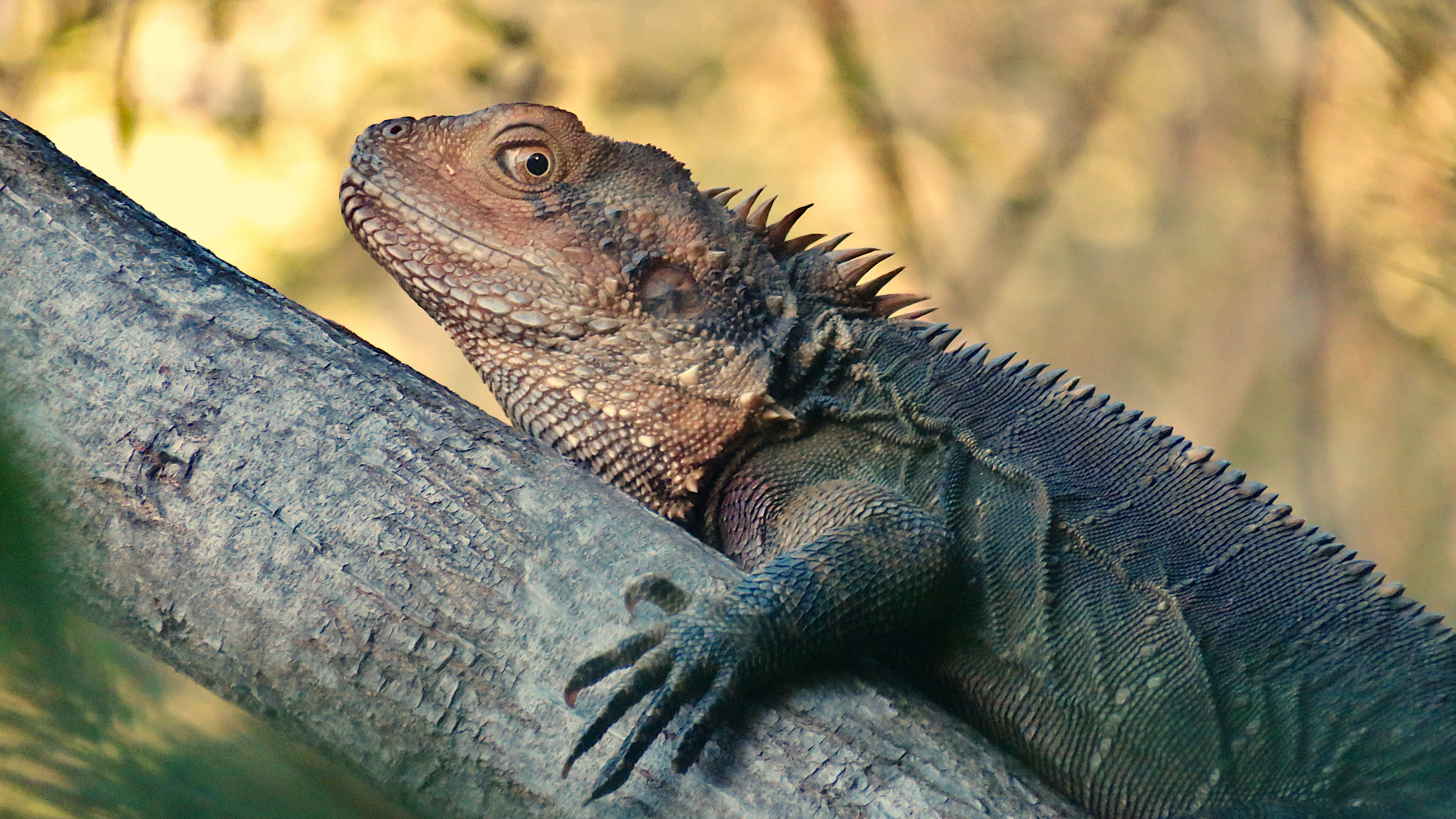
Adult male Australian Eastern water dragon in a tree overhanging a creek in suburban Brisbane

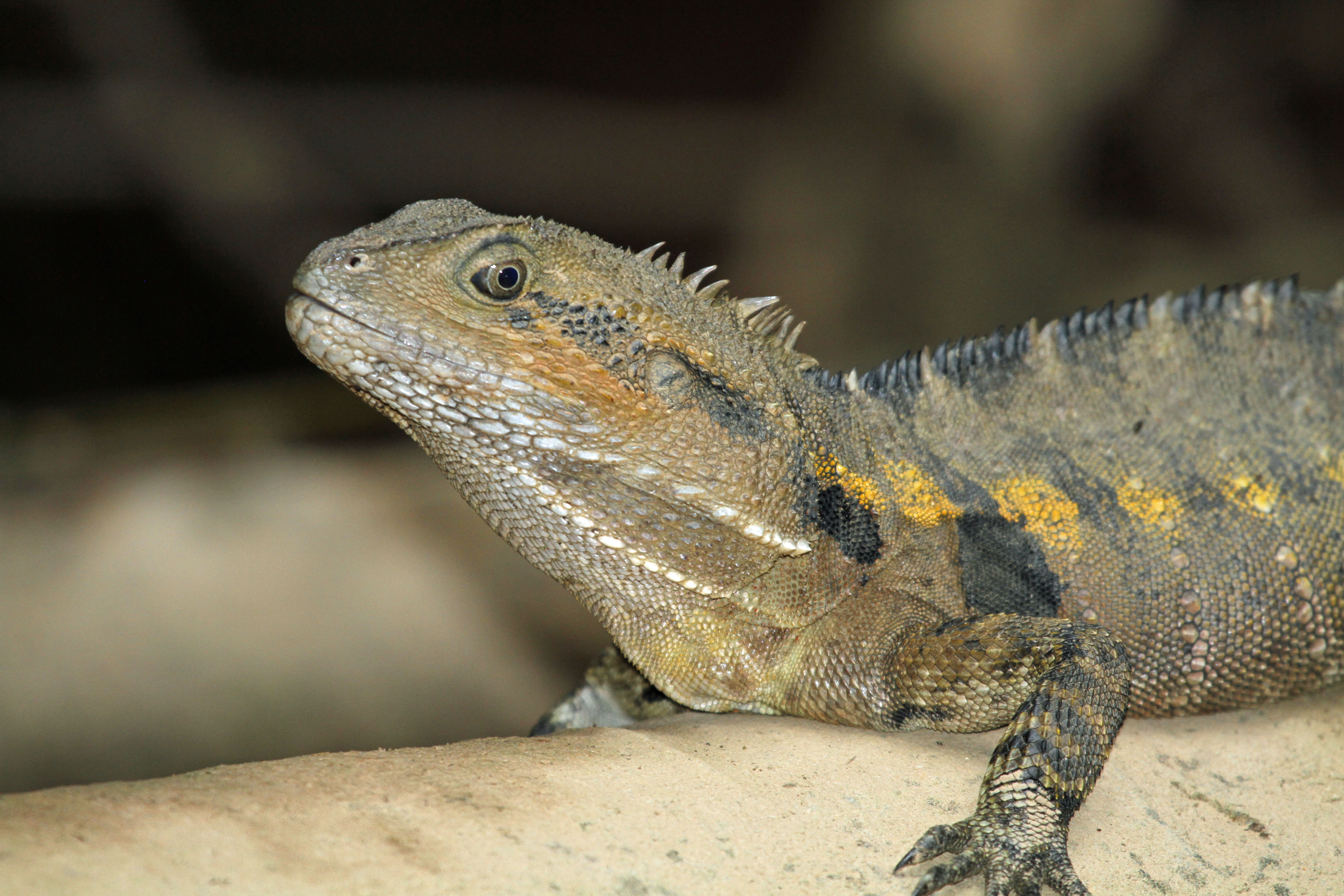
Northern form, showing yellow spots on flank (photographed near Cooktown).
