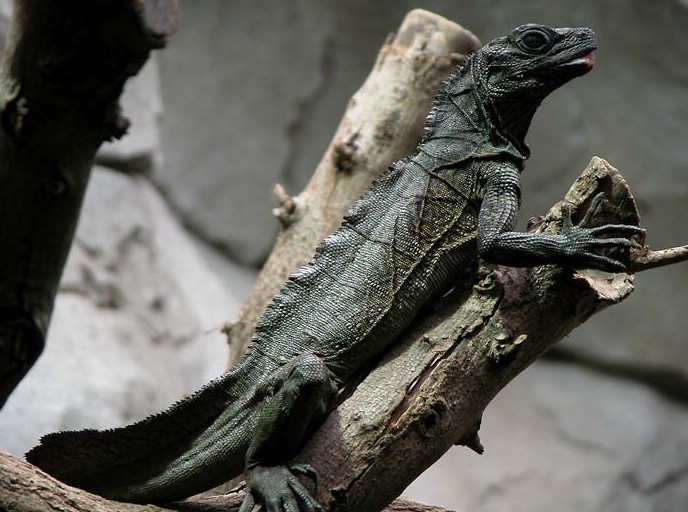
- Hydrosaurus amboinensis

Scientific classification
- Kingdom: Animalia
- Phylum: Chordata
- Class: Reptilia
- Order: Squamata
- Suborder: Iguania
- Family: Agamidae
- Subfamily: Hydrosaurinae; Kaup, 1828
- Genus: Hydrosaurus; Kaup, 1828

Type species
- Hydrosaurus amboinensis

Species
- Hydrosaurus amboinensis; Hydrosaurus celebensis; Hydrosaurus microlophus; Hydrosaurus pustulatus; Hydrosaurus weberi

Synonyms
- Lophura Gray, 1827; Istiurus Cuvier, 1829

= Hydrosaurus =

Genus of lizards

Hydrosaurus, commonly known as the sailfin dragons or sailfin lizards, is a genus in the family Agamidae. These relatively large lizards are named after the sail-like structure on their tails. They are native to Indonesia (four species) and the Philippines (one species), where they are generally found near water, such as rivers and mangrove swamps. Sailfin lizards are semiaquatic and able to run short distances across water using both their feet and tail for support, similar to the basilisks. They are threatened by both habitat loss and overcollection for the wild-animal trade.

In the 19th century, the genus was called Lophura, but in 1903, Poche pointed out that the name was preoccupied by a genus of pheasants. Since Günther in 1873, the Sulawesi populations were considered to belong to H. amboinensis; Denzer et al. in 2020 resurrected H. celebensis and H. microlophus, increasing the number of species from three to five.

They are the only members of the subfamily Hydrosaurinae.

== Species ==
Currently, five species are valid according to the Reptile Database,

| Image | Scientific name | Common name | Distribution |
|---|---|---|---|
| | Hydrosaurus amboinensis (Schlosser, 1768) | Moluccan sailfin lizard or Amboina sail-finned lizard, soa-soa water lizard | Western New Guinea, Ambon/Amboina Island and Ceram Island (Indonesia) |
| | Hydrosaurus celebensis (Peters, 1872) | Sulawesi black sailfin lizard | Indonesia (Sulawesi) |
| | Hydrosaurus microlophus (Bleeker, 1860) | Indonesian giant sailfin dragon, Makassar sailfin lizard, or Sulawesi giant sailfin dragon | Indonesia (Sulawesi) |
| | Hydrosaurus pustulatus (Eschsholtz, 1829) | Philippine sailfin lizard, layagan, balubid, or ibid | Philippine archipelago (except Palawan) |
| | Hydrosaurus weberi Barbour, 1911 | Weber's sailfin lizard | Ternate Island, North Maluku (Indonesia) Halmahera Island, North Maluku (Indonesia) |
