= Weber's sailfin lizard =

Conservation status
- Vulnerable (IUCN 3.1)

Scientific classification
- Kingdom: Animalia
- Phylum: Chordata
- Class: Reptilia
- Order: Squamata
- Suborder: Iguania
- Family: Agamidae
- Genus: Hydrosaurus
- Species: H. weberi

Binomial name
- Hydrosaurus weberi Barbour, 1911

Species of lizard

Weber's sailfin lizard or Halmahera sailfin dragon (Hydrosaurus weberi), is a species of lizard in the family Agamidae. The species is endemic to Indonesia.

== Geographic range ==
H. weberi is only found on Halmahera and Ternate Islands of Maluku.

== Longevity ==
H. weberi has a life-span of between 10 and 15 years and up to 25 years in captivity.

== Description ==
H. weberi is the smallest of the three recognized species of Hydrosaurus, attaining an average total length (including tail) of 2–3.2 ft (0.61–0.98 m). They are usually well distinguished with linear scales along their sides ending at the base of the tail. Their eyes are usually brown almost human like.

== Diet ==
H. weberi is omnivorous; devouring whatever animal it can overpower plus consuming a variety of vegetation and fruit.

== In captivity ==
In captivity, juveniles of H. weberi are usually maintained on a 70% insects 30% greens and fruit diet. Adults consume approximately 75% greens/fruit and 25% insects and other non-vegetation life.

== Reproduction ==
H. weberi is oviparous.

== Etymology ==
The specific name, weberi, is in honor of German-Dutch zoologist Max Wilhelm Carl Weber van Bosse.
