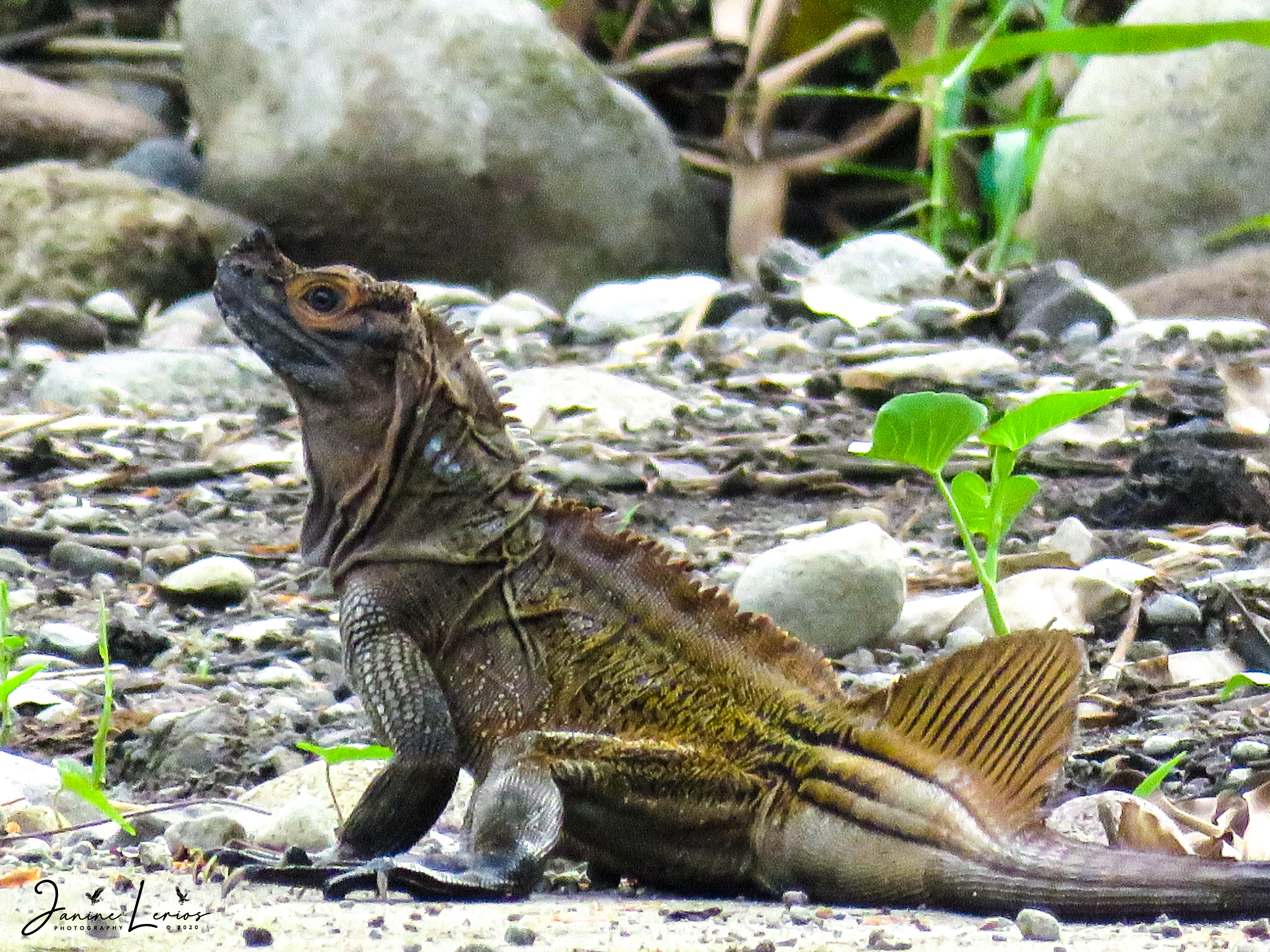
- Wild Philippine sailfin lizard in Leyte

Conservation status
- Least Concern (IUCN 3.1)

Scientific classification
- Kingdom: Animalia
- Phylum: Chordata
- Class: Reptilia
- Order: Squamata
- Suborder: Iguania
- Family: Agamidae
- Genus: Hydrosaurus
- Species: H. pustulatus

Binomial name
- Hydrosaurus pustulatus (Eschscholtz, 1829)

= Philippine sailfin lizard =

Species of lizard

Hydrosaurus pustulatus, commonly known as the Philippine sailfin lizard or the Philippine sailfin dragon, is a large semiaquatic agamid lizard endemic to all of the major island groups of the Philippines, with the exception of the Palawan islands. Like other sailfin lizards, they are characterized by large, sail-like dorsal crests on their tails. They can grow to a maximum length around 3 to 4 ft (0.91 to 1.22 m). They are strong swimmers, and smaller juvenile lizards can run briefly on the water surface. They inhabit areas of heavy vegetation near coastlines and low-lying rivers, particularly in mangrove forests. They are also known locally as layagan or balubid in Tagalog and ibid in the Visayan languages, among other names.

H. pustulatus is a protected species in the Philippines, as it is a target for the international exotic pet trade for their unique dorsal crests and bright coloration. The heavy deforestation of mangrove habitats in the last few decades is also a concern to their conservation.

== Taxonomy ==
Hydrosaurus pustulatus was first described as Istiturus pustulatus in 1828 by Baltic German naturalist Johann Friedrich von Eschscholtz. The specimens were collected from Luzon, Philippines, by Eschscholtz during the circumnavigational voyage of the Imperial Russian expeditionary ship Predpriaetie from 1823 to 1826. It is one of five species currently recognized under the genus Hydrosaurus, the sailfin dragons, and the only species found in the Philippines (the other species are native to Indonesia and Papua New Guinea).

Hydrosaurus pustulatus is highly variable in terms of coloration and scale patterns across geographic populations. A genetic study in 2014 has discovered that H. pustulatus is divided into six distinct genetic clusters. The most divergent of the group are the populations in Aurora, Luzon, and the Polillo Islands.

== Distribution and habitat ==
The Philippine sailfin lizard is found throughout the Philippine islands with the exception of the Palawan islands. Populations of Philippine sailfin lizards have been documented in Luzon (Aurora, Bicol), Polillo Islands, Samar, Leyte, Dinagat Islands, Camiguin, Bohol, Negros, Panay, Romblon (Romblon Island, Tablas, Sibuyan), Mindoro, and Mindanao (Zamboanga). The Philippine sailfin lizard lives in tropical wooded habitats near water, such as rivers and riverbanks, rice fields, and mangrove. The Philippine sailfin lizard lives in moderately high densities in these habitats. The Philippine sailfin lizard also prefers the bodies of water that they reside nearby being freshwater.

== Behavior and appearance ==
Philippine sailfin lizards usually grow to a length between two and three feet, including their tails. Males are larger than females and can grow to between 3 and 4 feet long (91–120 cm). These lizards typically weigh between 3 and 5 pounds (1.4–2.3 kg). Additionally, this species of lizard has a unique characteristic being its crest or sailfin, which is an upright part of its body that occurs from the base of the tail to the lower area of the back. This crest or sailfin is used not only to help with its ability to swim efficiently in water, but is also thought to assist with the lizard's ability to do territorial displays and heat/cool in different environments. The crest also makes the Philippine sailfin lizard's body look like a sail with regard to its structure. Overall, the body and tail of the Philippine sailfin lizard is largely cylindrical.

The juvenile Philippine sailfin lizard is an excellent swimmer and has flattened toes along with smaller mass compared to adults that enable it to run across water, similar to the basilisks. As the adult Philippine sailfin lizard gains weight, it loses the ability to run across water, but it uses these flattened toes to swim very effectively. The flattened toes also have scale fringes that can be used for swimming and running on top of water as mentioned. Males have a larger crest on their back than the females. The males also have bigger heads, taller sails on their tails, and darker limbs. During mating season, the head of the Philippine sailfin lizard becomes violet, while only the neck area of a female's crest can become violet. In terms of coloration, Philippine sailfin lizards have dark green and brown skin, and can also have yellow patches on the back side of their bodies and near their heads.

The Philippine sailfin lizard has a flattened tail that is used to propel in water more quickly, adding to its natural ability to be agile and swift in water to capture prey. In the presence of predators, the Philippine sailfin lizard either drops from the tree branch it is on, runs, or swims to the bottom of the body of water it is closest to; it can hold its breath for up to 15 minutes. Philippine sailfin lizards are also diurnal and spend most of the day time resting on vegetation out in the sun. In general, the Philippine sailfin lizard uses running to move around its habitats and away or toward predators and competitors, and its lifespan can be between 10 and 20 years. It also has a unique physical feature, a vestigial eye (which is also known as parietal or pineal eye) on the top of the lizard's skull that can detect differing angles of light from the sun and is thought to be used to find a sense of direction.

== Lifecycle and reproduction ==
Philippine sailfin lizards use their sailfins/scales for territorial displays in the presence of competing males or threats. They only breed once every year with potentially multiple clutches of eggs. For female Philippine sailfin lizards to lay their eggs after mating and birth, they dig relatively shallow holes in soil near their watery habitats, and these eggs then incubate for roughly two months. The eggs then hatch during the rainy season. Females are able to lay several clutches of eggs a year that each can contain between two and eight eggs, laid above the flood line.

== Conservation ==
Philippine sailfin lizards are classified as least concern by the IUCN, though they are increasingly becoming vulnerable. Their main threats are habitat loss, being hunted for food, and collection for the pet trade. Habitat loss is particularly critical, as only an estimated 7.5% of the mangrove forests of the Philippines are in protected areas. Over the last 75 years, 75% of the mangrove forests of the Philippines have been lost, mainly due to the repurposing of the land for urban development and aquaculture.

Philippine sailfin lizards are a protected species in the Philippines. Capturing them from the wild or to export them out of the country is illegal. They were sold in higher frequency between 1980 and 1990, before trade became illegal. A black market for Philippine sailfin lizards, though, still exists. Forensic examination of lizards in the exotic pets black market in Manila found that most of them were poached from the Bicol Region. Other major black markets for the species include Puerto Princesa, Cebu, and Davao.

== Diet ==
Philippine sailfin lizards are omnivores. They eat plant leaves and fruits, in addition to insects and crustaceans. Juveniles start out preferring meat more than plants, but the balance comes as they mature. Their diet is easy to replicate, so they are a target for exotic pet collectors, but they are less docile than other lizards. The Philippine sailfin lizard's omnivorous diet is also reflected by its relatively simple dental complexity, specifically with the posterior teeth of the mouth having less defined tricuspid teeth and the posterior teeth being tricuspid. As a result, the lizard cannot primarily be a carnivore since its teeth were not designed to do so.

== In captivity ==
Philippine sailfin lizards in captivity are typically kept in large enclosures with tropical-styled heating, semiarboreal resources, and access to submerging in water to mimic their natural environment. Breeding in captivity has only been done in a few cases, but this explanation has also been used as a method of smuggling the Philippine sailfin lizards out of their native habitats for sale. Since it is common in many parts of the Philippines, the pet trade in many regions still continues and some are even unrecognized by the government. Philippine sailfin lizards are to be approached with caution when held captive, as they are extremely nervous and can scratch people, but hand-feeding these lizards helps them become less nervous and gain trust.

== Gallery ==
Philippine sailfin lizard
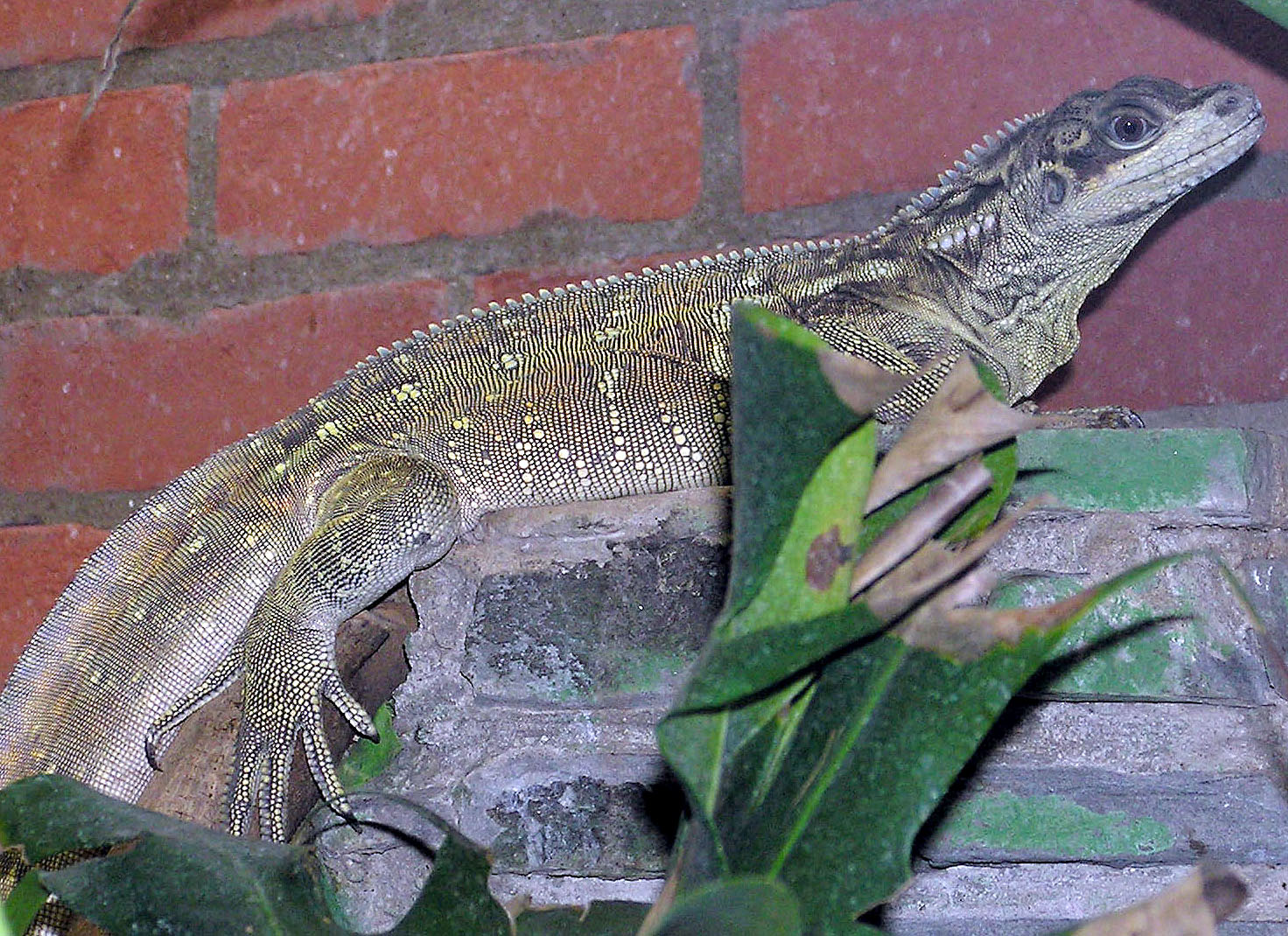
Philippine sailfin lizard at Bristol Zoo

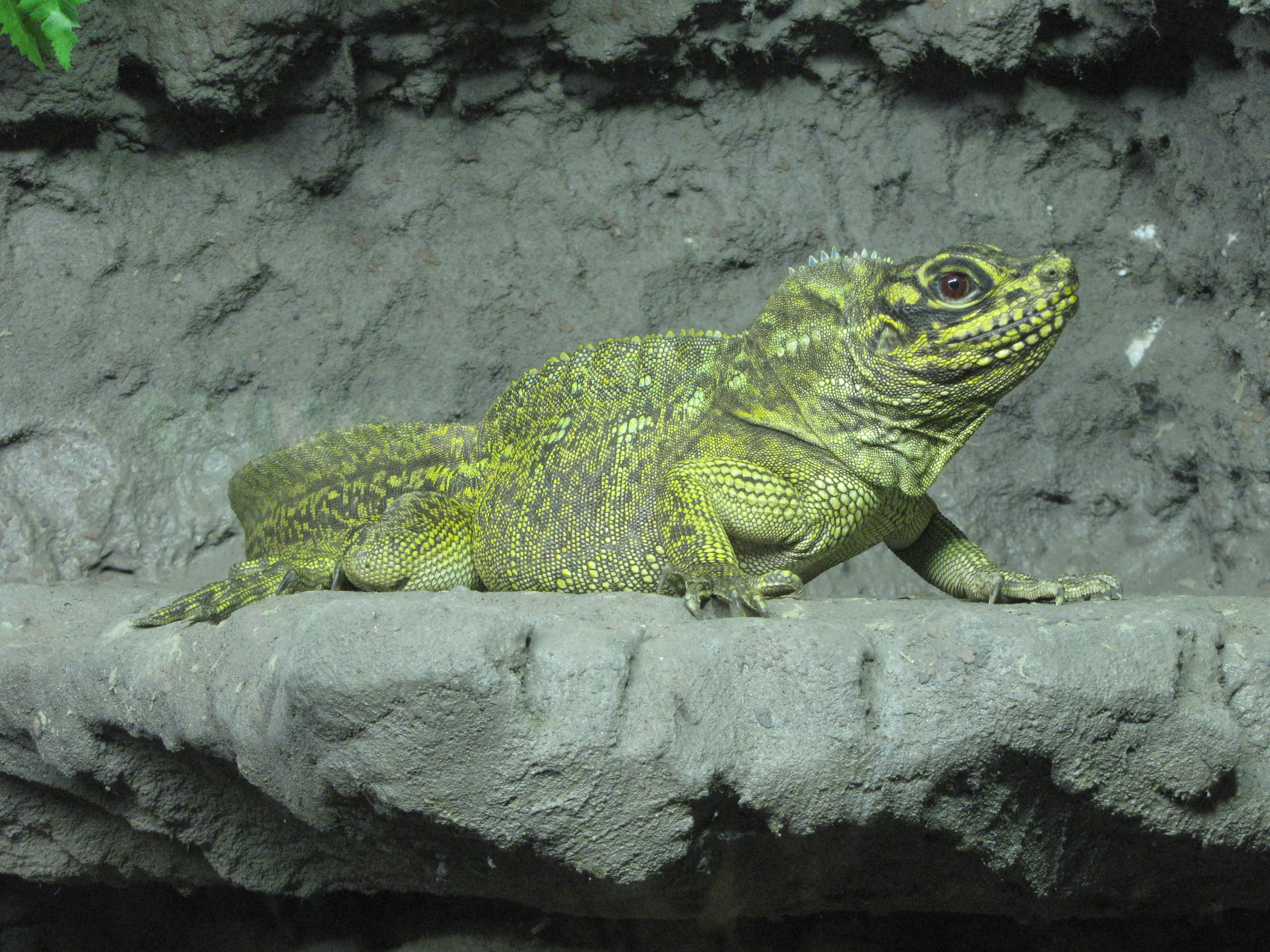
Philippine sailfin lizard in Tropicario in Helsinki, Finland

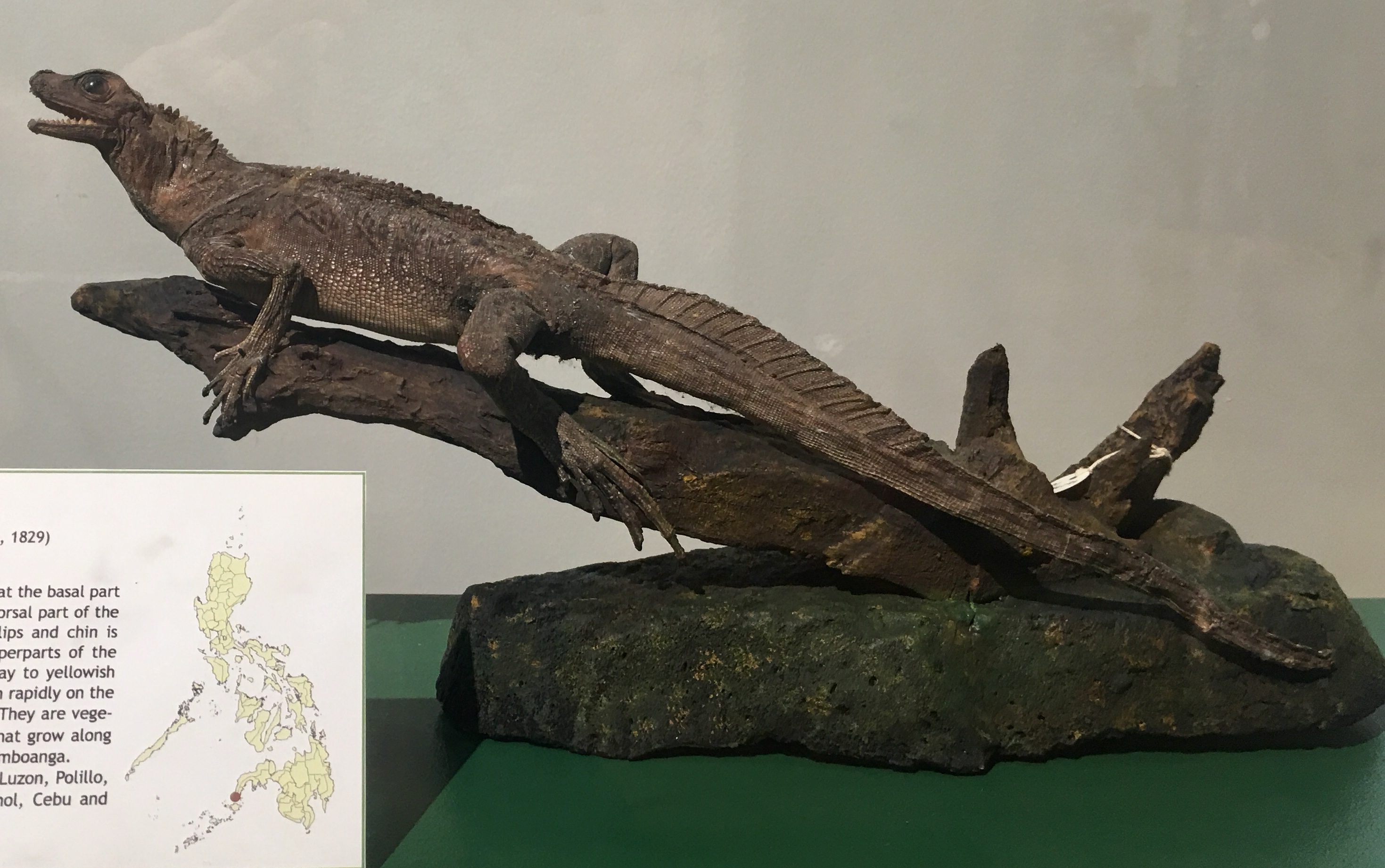
Taxidermied Philippine sailfin lizard displayed at the Philippine National Museum

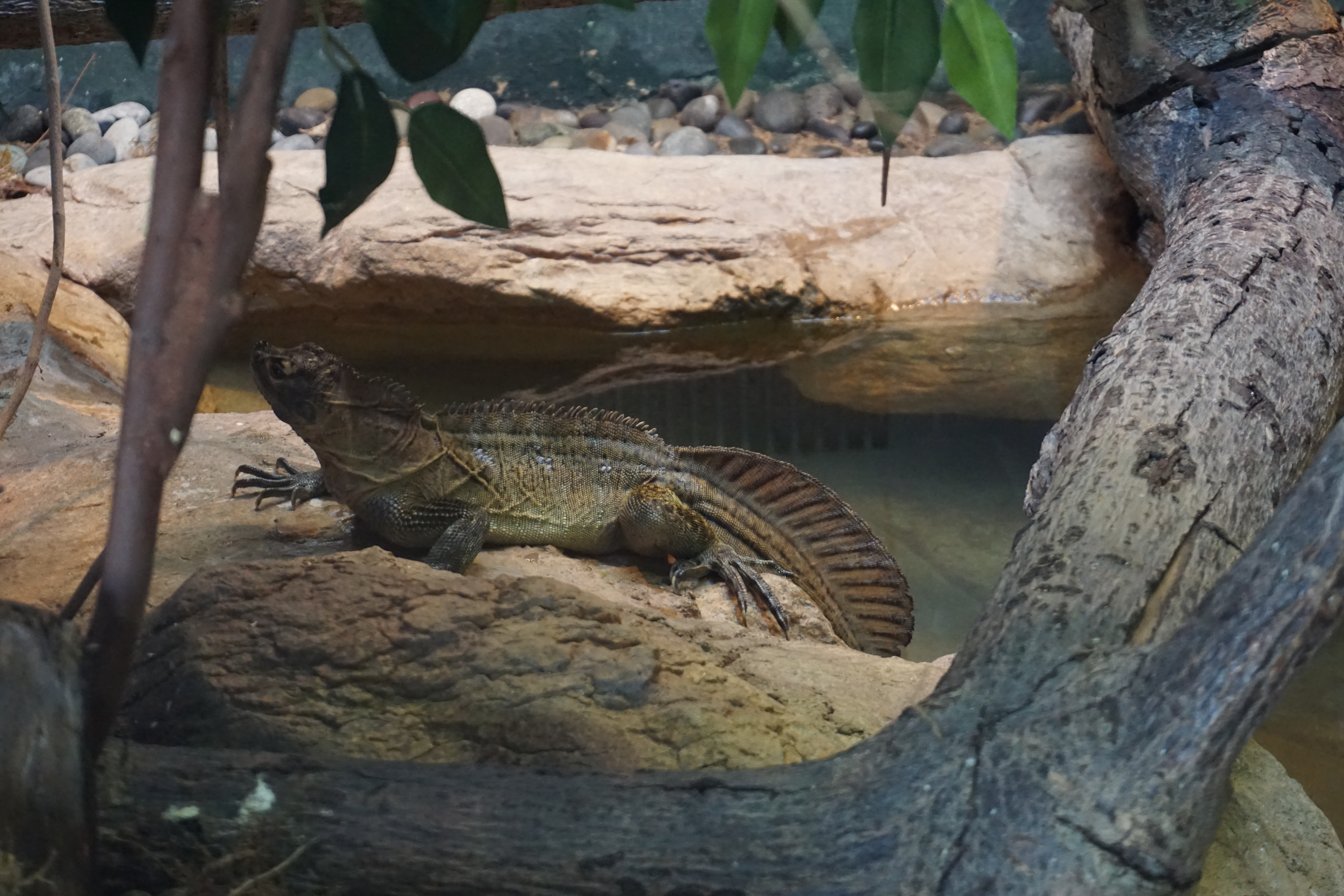
Living specimen at the San Diego Zoo
