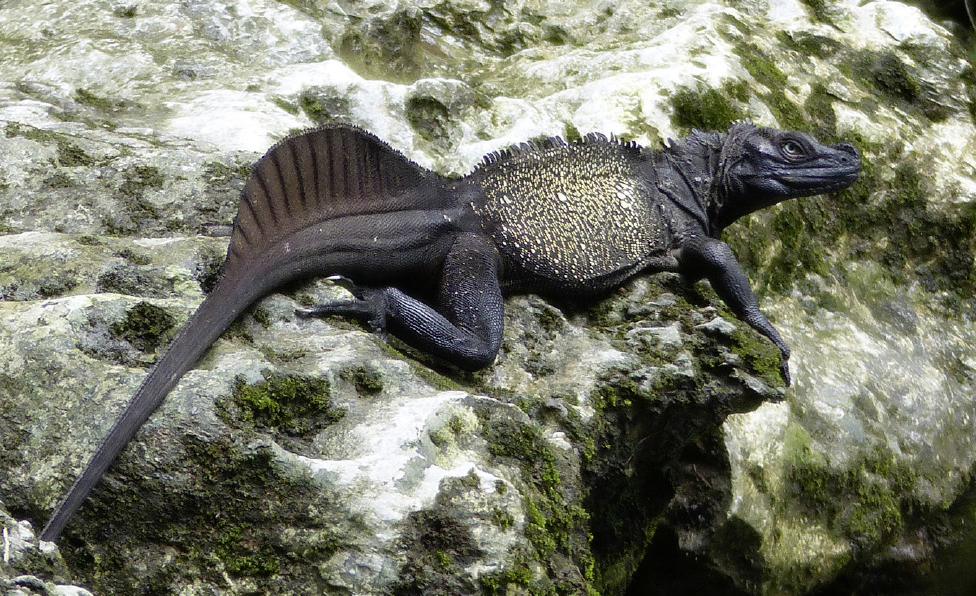

Scientific classification
- Domain: Eukaryota
- Kingdom: Animalia
- Phylum: Chordata
- Class: Reptilia
- Order: Squamata
- Suborder: Iguania
- Family: Agamidae
- Genus: Hydrosaurus
- Species: H. celebensis

Binomial name
- Hydrosaurus celebensis (Peters, 1872)

= Hydrosaurus celebensis =

Species of lizard

The Sulawesi black sailfin lizard (Hydrosaurus celebensis) is a species of agamid native to Indonesia. It is the second-largest species of sailfin dragon, with only the Sulawesi giant sailfin dragon being larger, exceeding 1.00 m in total length, possibly 1.200 m. Its head, neck, gular region, and shoulder are completely black; a row of enlarged flat, sometimes conical scales occurs on either side of the neck; its nuchal and dorsal crests are continuous; a group of dirty white, enlarged, flat scales are seen on the anterior part of the dorsum; few (<10) additional enlarged scales exist roughly at midbody and before the hind limbs. Dorsal colouration of this lizard is typically yellowish, sometimes dark orange, interspersed with black spots; ventrally it is beige, and its limbs are black with a few yellow spots; the scales under fourth and fifth toes are broad with several keels from near the base of the toe; the tail is black, sail black, or dark violet with black stripes.

== Reproduction ==
H. celebensis is oviparous.
