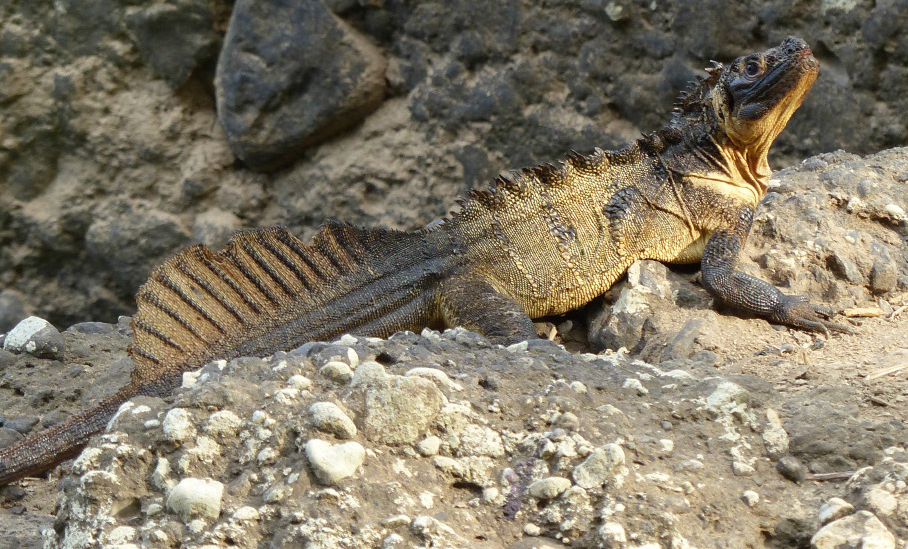

Scientific classification
- Kingdom: Animalia
- Phylum: Chordata
- Class: Reptilia
- Order: Squamata
- Suborder: Iguania
- Family: Agamidae
- Genus: Hydrosaurus
- Species: H. microlophus

Binomial name
- Hydrosaurus microlophus (Bleeker, 1860)

= Hydrosaurus microlophus =

Species of lizard

The Indonesian giant sailfin dragon (Hydrosaurus microlophus) is a species of agamid native to South Sulawesi, Indonesia. It is the heaviest and longest species of sailfin lizard, making it the largest of all the Agamidae. It is often mistaken for H. amboinensis because of the incorrect information of H. amboinensis being the largest of the sailfin dragons.

== Reproduction ==
H. microlophus is oviparous.
