= Lepidosaur herbivory =

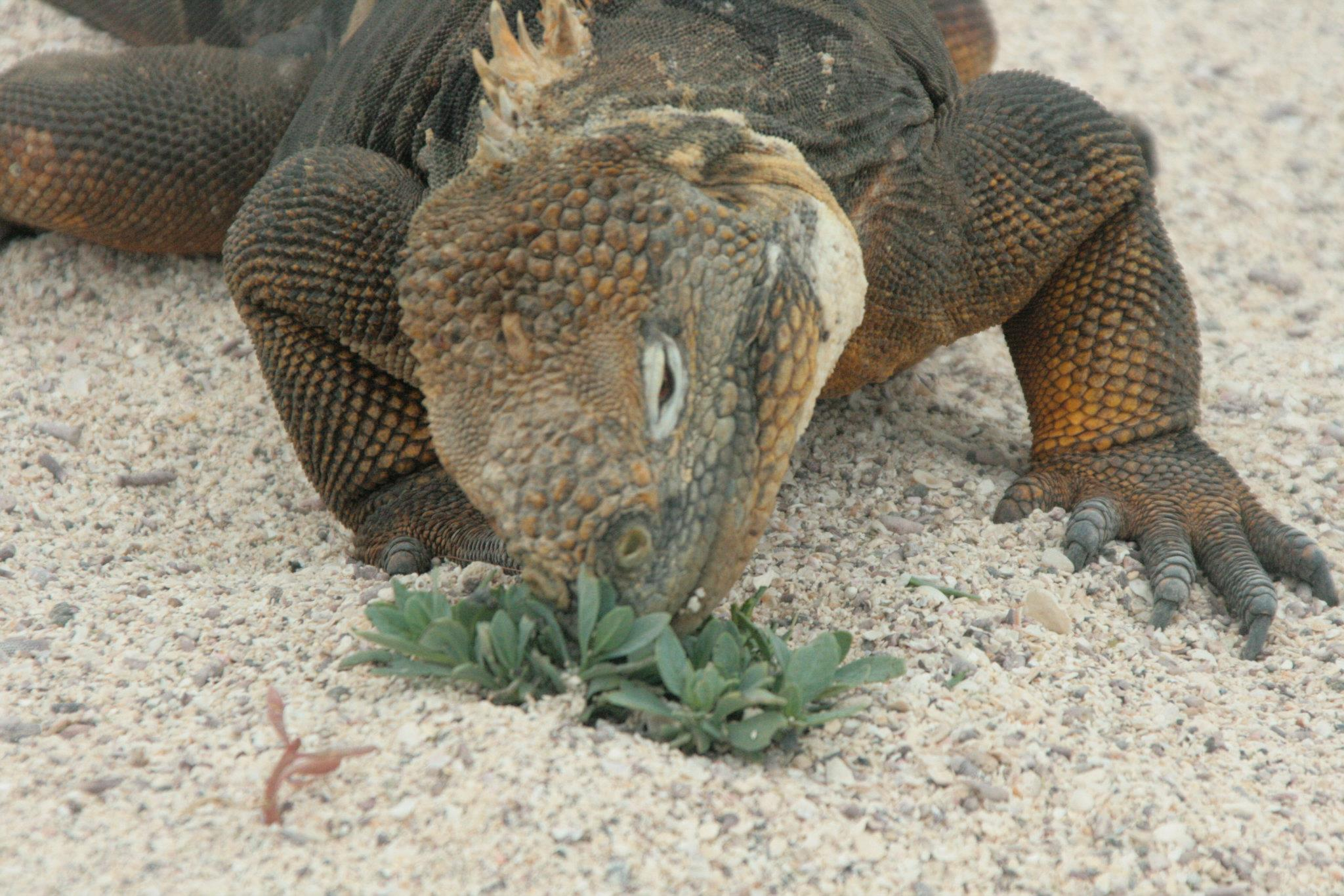
Iguanas, such as this Galapagos land iguana (Conolophus subcristatus), are herbivorous.

Lepidosaur herbivory describes herbivorous lepidosaurs. Living non-avian reptiles form a paraphyletic group that consists of over 9,000 species of crocodiles, turtles, and lepidosaurs. The most diverse group, Lepidosauria, is first known from the Middle Triassic (240 million years ago) fossils, but likely originated in the Permian (approximately 300-250 million years ago). Living lepidosaurs, which include snakes, lizards, and rhynchocephalians, occupy a wide range of environments and niches. The lepidosaurs have many similar anatomical morphology like transverse cloaca, distal tongue, superficial teeth attachment, fused pelvic bones etc. Though widely viewed as obligate carnivores, a small number of lepidosaurs are known to consume plant material. For example, there are roughly 3,300 species of living lizards and approximately 3% of them eat at least some plants. Though the exact definition of herbivory varies significantly between scientists, most define herbivorous lepidosaurs as those that consume plants for approximately 70-90% of its diet.

== Evolution of herbivory in lepidosaurs ==
=== Herbivory in fossil lepidosaurs ===
The fossil record of herbivorous lepidosaurs extends into the Late Triassic period, nearly 227 million years ago. A recently described sphenodontian reptile is one of the oldest known herbivorous lepidosaurs. This animal possesses a number of features that demonstrate an herbivorous lifestyle, such as a specialized jaw movement (propalinal) and closely packed teeth that appear to be useful in the shearing of plant material. Phylogenetic analysis shows that herbivory likely evolved in the sphenodontian clade once, specifically within a group called the Opisthodontia. This group of herbivorous sphenodonts possessed wide, shredding teeth and became extinct during the Late Cretaceous (approximately 65 million years ago). These ancient herbivorous animals clearly demonstrate that the ability to consume plant material evolved very early in the history of lepidosaurs.

The evolution of herbivory in squamates (the group that includes lizards and snakes) is less well known, though herbivorous species are found in the fossil record. A large bodied lizard, Polyglyphanodon sternbergi, from the Late Cretaceous of Utah is likely an herbivore. The diet is reconstructed based on the tooth shape; a thin transverse blade-like tooth, with fine serrations, similar to living iguanas. Others, such as Barbaturex morrisoni, illuminate important ecological niches that living squamates do not fill in modern environments. B. morrisoni is an herbivorous acrodontan lizard found in the middle Eocene of Myanmar and is notable for its large body size (approximately 1 meter). The large body size demonstrates that competition with herbivorous mammals did not limit the mass of this genus. B. morrisoni also provides evidence that large lizards can occupy ecological niches that are commonly thought to belong solely to mammals, such as a large bodied terrestrial herbivore.

=== Modern herbivory ===
In their 2002 study, William Cooper Jr. and Laurie Vitt investigated the dietary patterns of over a hundred lizards and found that many groups have representatives that consume plant material. Omnivory has evolved independently several times within lepidosaurs, whereas the evolution of obligate herbivory has proved to be more rare. For example, in the Iguania clade, omnivory and herbivory have independently evolved at least nine times. When other lepidosaur clades are included, Cooper and Vitt (2002) demonstrate that omnivory evolved at least 32 separate times. Obligate herbivory, on the other hand, has only evolved 10 times in living, non-liolaemid lizards (nearly 7,700 species). Though, one clade seems to be an exception to this pattern of infrequently developed herbivory. A 2004 study investigated a unique group of South American lizards called the Liolaemidae. The authors of this study found that this clade evolved herbivory approximately 65 times faster than other squamates. Specifically, herbivory has evolved 18 times in liolaemids (approximately 170 species). It has been clearly demonstrated that these herbivorous animals have evolved from omnivorous ancestors and not directly from carnivores. Unfortunately, many biological studies have not investigated the possible timing that key herbivorous characteristics evolved; leaving the amount of time these organisms have possessed these traits unknown. The distinctions in dietary ecology that are observed today are likely a result of early ecological differences between clades. The separation of the Iguania and Scleroglossa (a group including geckos, snakes, skinks, and varanids) clades in the late Triassic best demonstrates this. It is hypothesized that the early Scleroglossa possessed traits that were better suited for hunting, such as the ability to distinguish prey by means of chemical processes, whereas the Iguania did not possess these traits. Therefore, the current dietary diversity within the Iguania (including a large number of herbivores) is due to certain traits held by early representatives of this clade.

== Living herbivorous lepidosaurs ==
There are more than 7,800 species of squamate reptiles living today and approximately 2% of them are herbivorous, though the number is continually increasing). Herbivorous squamates are known from all major groups, including varanids. Less than two decades ago it was believed that there were no herbivorous Anguinomorpha (the clade that includes monitor lizards and possibly snakes;), but recent researched has demonstrated that the species Varanus mabitang was a strict herbivore and its sister species, Varanus olivaceus, may be an omnivore. Additionally, a new giant (>2 m in length) varanid (Varanus bitatawa) may also solely consume fruit, though a thorough examination of its dietary ecology has not been conducted. Though present in all major squamate clades, herbivory is most prevalent within the Iguania. In this group alone, herbivory and omnivory developed at least nine times. Herbivory is well developed in the Iguanidae, a clade within the Iguania. The majority of the animals that have been studied utilize plant material for nearly 100% of their diet, and therefore, the common ancestor of this group was likely an herbivore. Within the liolaemids, herbivory has evolved at least eight times (though it is estimated to have evolved upwards of 18 times). Additionally, the Agamidae evolved herbivory twice, in the genera Hydrosaurus and Uromastyx.

Herbivory is rare in species outside the Iguania clade, but is present in isolated squamate groups. Within the Scincomorpha (a clade that includes skinks), herbivory independently evolves at least seven times. Specifically, herbivory independently develops at least once in the Lacertidae, Gerrhosauridae, Teiidae clades, and four times in the Scincidae (in the Corucia, Egernia, Macroscincus, and Tiliqua genera).

== Diet ==
There is a diverse range in diets among herbivorous lepidosaurs. The marine iguana, Amblyrhynchus cristatus, feeds primarily on algae. The spiny-tail lizard (Uromastyx aegyptia), which is found throughout the deserts of the Middle East, feeds mainly on desert grasses. This lizard likely also eats flowering plants, but due to no rain falling during the study period, the animals were not observed consuming these plants. Other herbivores, such as Ctenosaura pectinata (the spiny-tail iguana), have a mixed diet, with 52% of its diet composed of leaves, 35% flowers, and 2% of fruits. This diet stands in stark contrast with an iguana from the same genus, Ctenosaura similis. This animal's diet is composed of primarily fruit (73%) and leaves (25%), with no consumption of flowers.

The green iguana (Iguana iguana) has a similar diet to the spiny-tail iguana, with its diet composed of 52.1% leaves, 7.7% fruit, and 35.2% flowers. Research has demonstrated that green iguanas are selective in their plant choice, specifically in leaves. Green iguanas, regardless of age, preferentially select immature leaves to eat. Additionally, younger individuals (hatchlings and juveniles) consumed a higher proportion of immature leaves than adults. This selection allows them to access leaves high in protein. The diet of the herbivorous varanid, Varanus mabitang, is composed of fruits from palms augmented by the seeds of screw palms and figs. Many herbivorous lizards will eat insects in captivity. For example, the desert iguana (Dipsosaurus dorsalis) consistently eats mealworms in zoos, whereas in the wild its diet consists of solely plants. The desert iguana also provides an excellent example of seasonal diet changes in herbivorous reptiles. Flowers from the creosote bush make up its diet in the springtime, whereas after the month of May the diet is made up of a more diverse range of plant material.

=== Ontogenetic effect on diet ===
Though not well understood for most lizards, the diet of some herbivorous reptiles changes through ontogeny. This dietary shift is well documented in the spiny-tailed iguana, Ctenosaura pectinata. Insects compose more than 85% of the diet of juveniles, whereas the diet of adults is completely herbivorous. The shift is not due to the inability to consume plant material, as juveniles possess an enlarged hindgut (a feature that demonstrates their ability to digest plant material). Instead, this ontogenetic change in diet is likely due to growth demands. Juveniles of the genus Ctenosaura have a higher growth rate than other herbivorous reptiles, and insects are a rich source of protein that is easily digested. Other ontogenetic shifts in diet involve changes in plant consumption. Juvenile green iguanas preferentially select immature leaves, which are rich in protein, though fiber content is high. Therefore, juvenile iguanas employ a different strategy for attaining the energy necessary for an increased growth rate.

== Biomechanics ==
Herbivorous lizards possess a number of adaptations that allow them to consume plant material. These adaptations range from changes in tooth morphology to shifts in the digestive system.

=== Cranium ===
Until recently, it was believed that the skulls of herbivorous lizards varied little from that of their carnivorous relatives. Using a technique called geometric morphometrics, Stayton (2006) demonstrated that there is convergence to a similar skull shape among herbivorous lizards. The convergent features, which include large orbits, reduced snouts, and a tall skull, allow for a strong bite. Additionally, herbivorous lizards often possess a fleshy tongue, which is used to manipulate food in the mouth. In fact, in Ctenosaura pectinata, many leaves found in the stomach were folded into a bolus, likely to increase the amount of food that the animal can consume.

=== Teeth ===
The dental morphology of herbivorous lizards has been studied in greater detail. One of the first studies was published in 1955 and investigated the correlation between diet and tooth morphology. Hotton (1955) found that the tooth morphology did vary with diet, and that herbivorous taxa tended to possess laterally compressed, sharp, cuspate teeth. Later research supported this, and found that this morphology, particularly in Iguana, may be used to shear plants. Throckmorton (1976) compared Iguana iguana and Uromastyx aegyptia and found distinct similarities and differences between the taxa. It was found that both used their dentition to crop plants, even though their tooth shape differs significantly. The teeth come together and act as scissors, which allow the jaw muscles to act at one point at a time, shearing the plant material. In both animals the fleshy tongue is used to hold the plant material in place as the teeth cut through it. In Iguana iguana the pterygoid teeth aid in stabilizing the food, whereas the dentary of Uromastyx moves back to accomplish the same task. The difference in dental morphology between these two taxa is due to distinct tooth replacement strategies. The Iguana teeth are continually replaced, likely due to their fragility, whereas the Uromastyx teeth are not replaced and must be longer lasting. It is thought that little mastication occurs in both species, aside from simple cropping. Unfortunately, little other research has been conducted on the function of herbivorous reptile teeth.

=== Digestive system ===
The digestive system of herbivorous lizards has undergone significant modification when compared to carnivorous lizards. For example, these animals store symbiotic microorganisms in the foregut and hindgut that specifically aid in the digestion of plant material. Much of the fermentation of the plant material occurs in the hindgut, or colon, where symbiotic organisms breakdown plant material that has otherwise been resistant to digestion. In both small and large lizards the small intestine is relatively shorter, whereas the large intestine is relatively longer. There have also been additional transverse valves documented in the large intestine, specifically in Ctenosaura pectinata. The number of these septa increased through ontogeny, with juveniles (who are insectivorous) having two to four valves, whereas adults possessed five to six. These valves help slow the passage of food, which allow the symbiotic organisms more time to breakdown difficult to digest material. Furthermore, the transverse slit receive ducts and products of the genital, digestive and urinary tract.

=== Sensory system ===
Lepidosaurs take advantage of their sensory system to assist them in food detection and consumption. Their sensory vision consists of a retina covered with single layer of photoreceptor cells and the nocturnal lepidosaurs also have rod-like cells in their photoreceptor cells. Chemoreception further allows them to detect food odours through the Vomeronasal System (Jacobsen's organ), olfactory system through the nasal cavity and gustation by the tongue's surface.

== Effect of temperature on diet ==
Until recently, it was believed that herbivorous lizards were restricted to the tropics and a large body size. These constraints were thought to be a result of their supposed inefficiency in digesting their food compared to carnivorous lizards or mammalian herbivores. Herbivorous lizards utilize symbiotic microorganisms to aid in the digestion of plant material, and higher internal temperatures promote these organisms and the digestion of plant material overall. Zimmerman and Tracy (1989) found that lower body temperatures decreased the rate at which food passes through the digestive system in the chuckwalla (Sauromalus obsesus). Additionally, it was believed that herbivory was found only in large lizards (>300g). A large body size would encourage a higher and more stable body temperature, on average. Large body size also makes it difficult and inefficient to catch and consume small insects, making herbivory the only energy efficient option for large-bodied lizards, though varanids were not considered in these studies.

The recent discovery of a large number of small-bodied herbivorous lizards (>100g; liolaemids) living in South America has forced scientists to rethink the physiological constraints faced by herbivorous lizards. Many of these lizards live at higher latitudes or elevations, and therefore, in much cooler climates than those seen in the tropics. The authors of these studies find that, similar to tropical herbivorous lizards, the liolaemids have a higher body temperature, which may explain their small body size. A small body size would allow these lizards to take advantage of the brief warm periods experienced at high latitudes or elevations, which a larger lizard would otherwise not be able to exploit. These animals illustrate the breadth of information that remains unknown with regard to herbivorous lepidosaurs.
