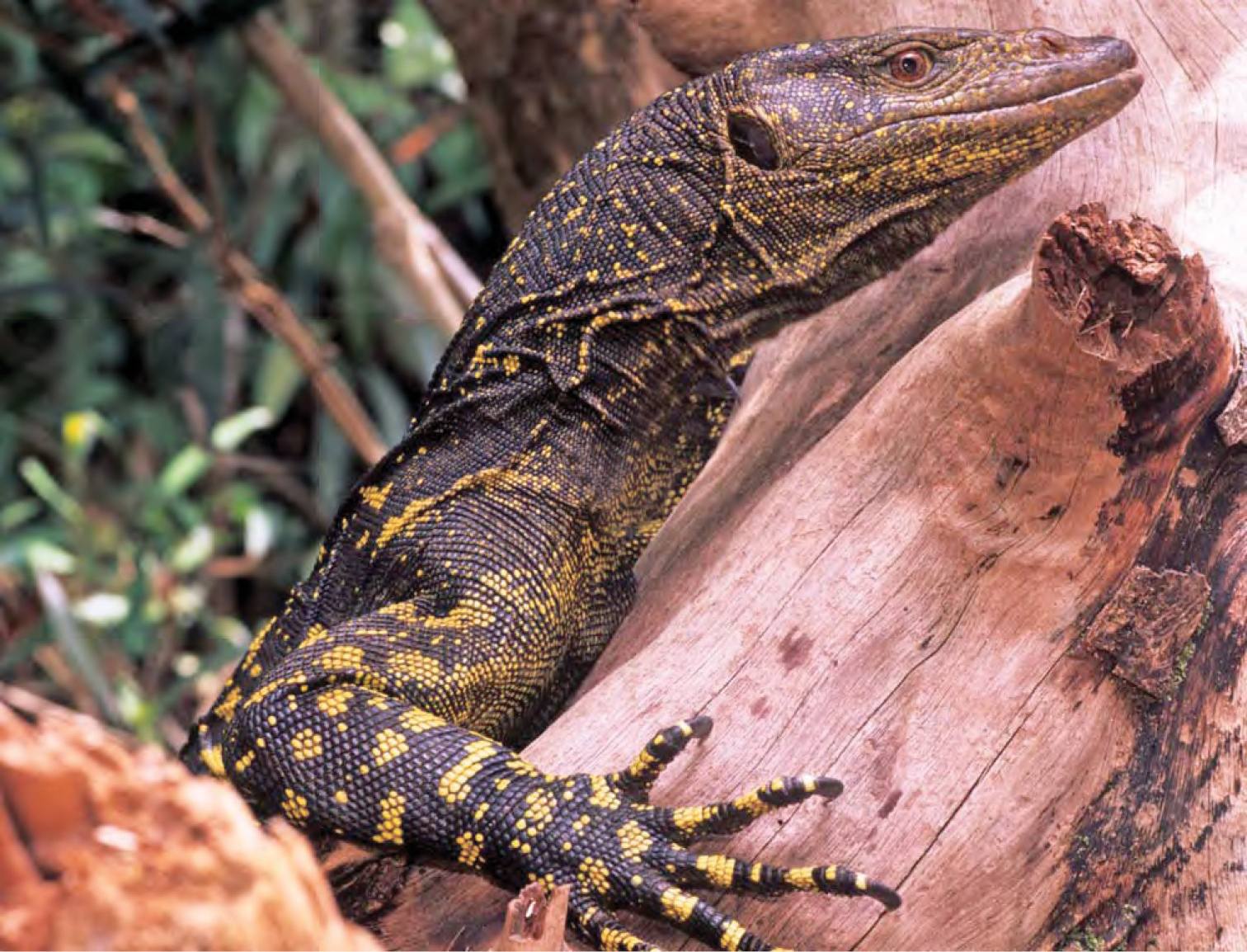

Conservation status
- Near Threatened (IUCN 3.1)

Scientific classification
- Kingdom: Animalia
- Phylum: Chordata
- Class: Reptilia
- Order: Squamata
- Suborder: Anguimorpha
- Family: Varanidae
- Genus: Varanus
- Subgenus: Philippinosaurus
- Species: V. bitatawa

Binomial name
- Varanus bitatawa Welton, Siler, Bennett, Diesmos, Duya, Dugay, Rico, Van Weerd, & Brown, 2010
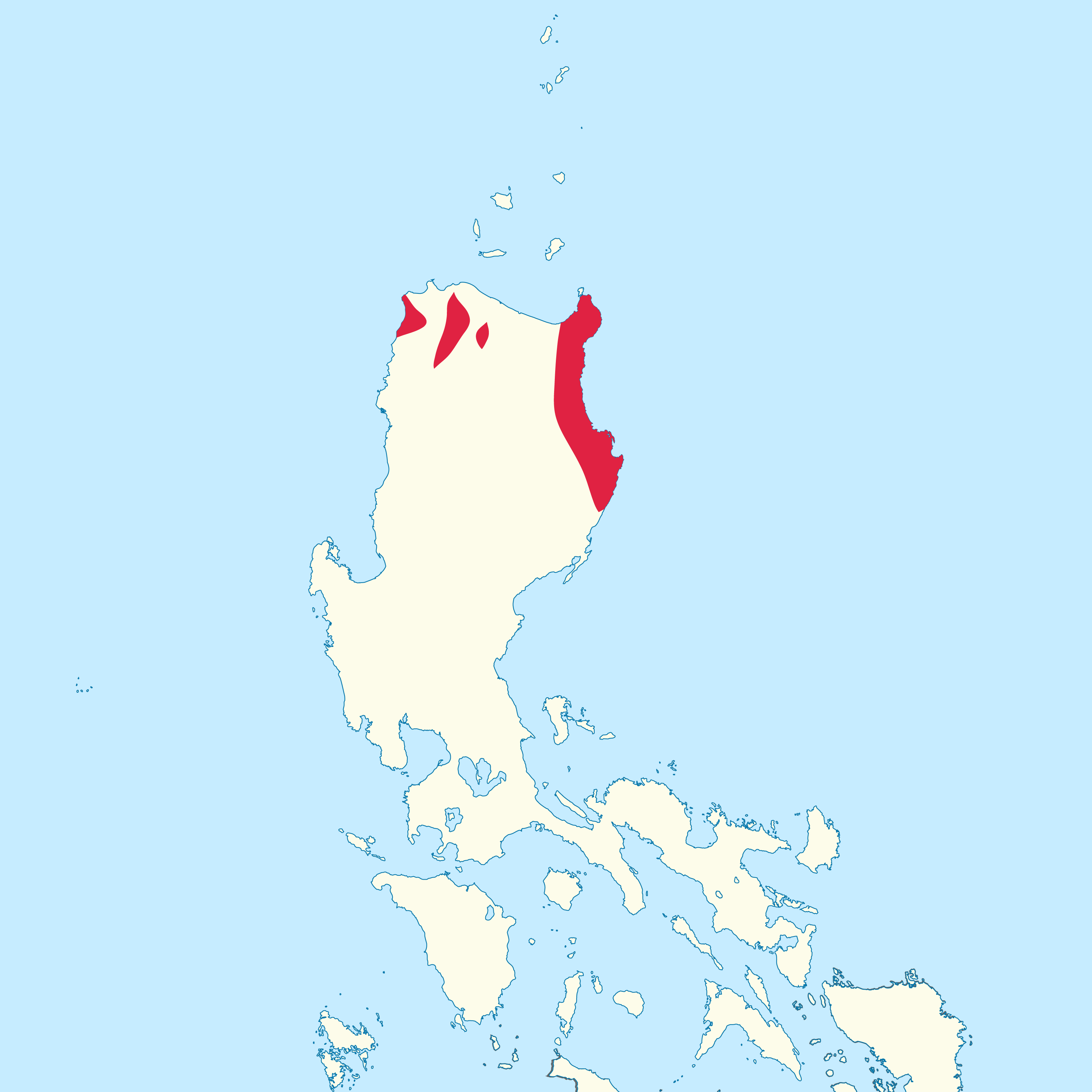
- Range of Varanus bitatawa

= Northern Sierra Madre forest monitor =

Species of lizard

The Northern Sierra Madre forest monitor (Varanus bitatawa), also known by the local names bitatawa, baritatawa, and butikaw, is a large, arboreal, frugivorous lizard of the genus Varanus.

== Description ==
Dorsal view of Varanus bitatawa, inset showing a lateral view of the head

The forest monitor lizard can grow to more than 2 m (6 ft 7 in) in length, and weigh up to 15 kg (33 lb), or possibly more. Its scaly body and legs are a blue-black mottled with pale yellow-green dots, while its tail is marked in alternating segments of black and green. Dorsal ground coloration is black, accentuated with bright golden yellow in life, while the dorsum is golden yellow spots and flecks.

News reports emphasized that males have hemipenes, paired penis-like organs. However, all male lizards and snakes have hemipenes.

=== Behavior ===
Varanus bitatawa is one of only three species of frugivorous monitor lizards, along with V. olivaceus and V. mabitang.

The diet of the Northern Sierra Madre forest monitor is reliant on the fruit of Pandan palm trees and Canarium. As a result it is likely an important seed disperser of these plants, but particularly of Canarium, because the consumption of its fruit by monitors of the subgenus Philippinosaurus is an unusual adaptation amongst vertebrates, being able to detoxify the high levels of secondary compounds such as calcium oxalate which otherwise makes digestion difficult.

During June and July, the short fruiting season of Microcos stylocarpa occurs, and their diet then switches to mostly consisting of its sugary berries as opposed to the oilier fruits of Pandan palms and Canarium.

Like V. olivaceus, and unlike V. mabitang, it is not a strict herbivore, supplementing its frugivorous diet with insects and snails.

They spend most of their time in trees, more than 20 meters above the ground; similar species spend less than 20 minutes on the ground per week.

== Taxonomy and distribution ==
Varanus bitatawa was described as a new species in April 2010 by biologists from the University of Kansas. The holotype specimen was salvaged from a hunter. The specific epithet comes from 'bitatawa', the Aeta name for the species. DNA analysis has revealed genetic divergence between this species and its closest relative, Gray's Monitor (Varanus olivaceus), which is also a fruit-eater, but lives on the southern end of Luzon, rather than the northern end where the forest monitor lizard lives.

The known range of Varanus bitatawa is currently limited to the Sierra Madre Forest on the northeastern coast of the island of Luzon, Philippines.

Varanus bitatawa is most closely related to another species of fruit-eating monitor from the Philippines, V. olivaceus. The relationship of these two species to the third known species of fruit-eating monitor, V. mabitang, is unknown due to a lack of genetic data on V. mabitang, but similar genital morphology suggests that these three species are each others' closest relatives (sometimes referred to as subgenus Philippinosaurus).

Fruit-eating monitor lizards are most closely related to a larger Indo-Asian clade of small monitor lizards that includes the arboreal V. prasinus complex and the mangrove monitors (V. indicus complex). They are more distantly related to other Indo-Asian monitor lizards, such as V. salvator, and still more distantly related to Indo-Australian monitors, including the well-known Komodo dragon of Indonesia.

== Conservation ==
Despite being a shy and reclusive species that escaped the notice of biologists until very recently, the species is well known to the indigenous Aeta and Ilongot people who hunt it for food. Both indigenous tribes and the bushmeat market view it as a prized target, making it a heavily hunted species. The Aeta hunt it particularly heavily, preferring it over the marbled water monitor (which is also frequently targeted by the bushmeat market). Although the hunting of wildlife is illegal without a permit in the Philippines under Republic Act No. 9147 9 (with indigenous peoples being exceptions to this rule), the hunting of monitor lizards for personal consumption, the bushmeat market, and the pet trade is widespread and largely uncontrolled.

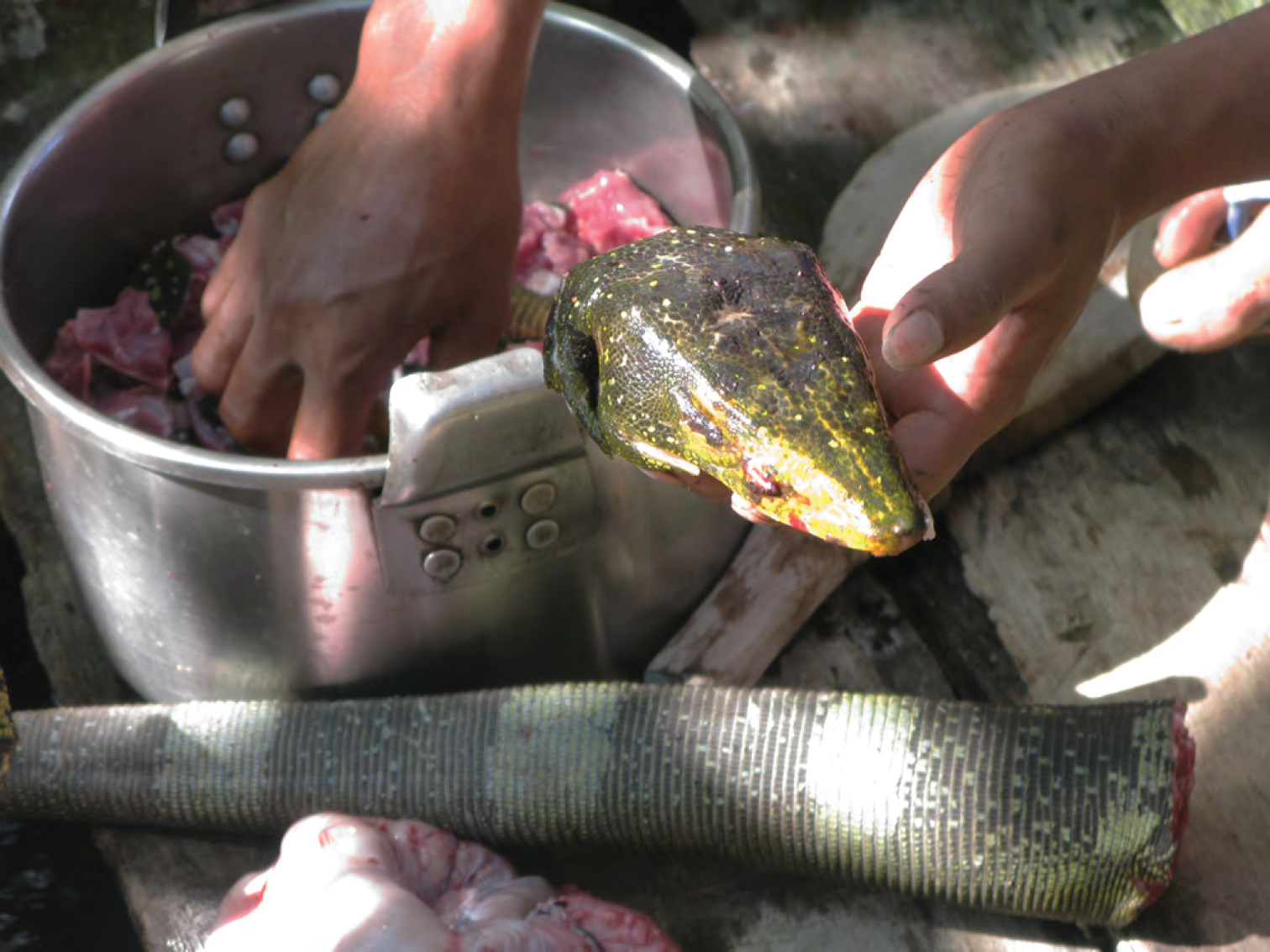
Being prepared for stew by Aeta tribesmen.

As it is arboreal and heavily relies on the largest trees in its habitat, it is highly vulnerable to the illegal selective logging that occurs on the already heavily deforested island of Luzon. Selective logging of the dipterocarp forests in which it lives forces it to shelter in smaller trees instead, rending them more visible and more vulnerable to hunting. Furthermore the species cannot be found in areas with regular human activity, such as the proximity of human settlements, making it vulnerable to human encroachment.

An additional problem is the road construction in Northern Sierra Madre Natural Park fragmenting its habitat, and has made this habitat more accessible to loggers, farmers, and hunters.

The first record of this species being illegally captured for sale in the pet trade occurred in 2012, when an 1.7 metre long adult was listed on social media at an asking price of ₱ 100,000 PHP ($2,380 USD).
