= Wingham Wildlife Park =

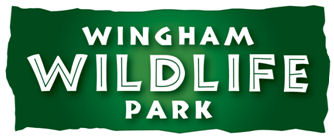
- "Take a Walk on the Wild Side"

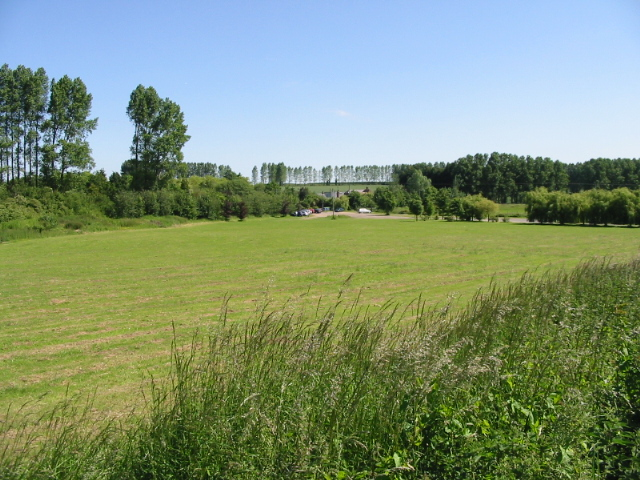
- View across field to Wingham Wildlife Park
- Interactive map of Wingham Wildlife Park
- 51.2799°N 1.2281°E
- Date opened: 1986
- Location: Wingham, Kent, England (between Canterbury and Sandwich)
- Land area: 23 acres
- No. of animals: 773 (2013)
- No. of species: 209
- Memberships: International Species Information System, International Zoo Educators Association, South East Asian Zoos Association
- Website: www.winghamwildlifepark.co.uk

Wingham Wildlife Park is a medium-sized wildlife park situated near Wingham, Kent, United Kingdom where it covers an area of 26 acres (13 acres of animal housing area and a further 13 acres of car parking and overflow). In 2011, the species count at the park reached 180 species, growing to over 200 in 2013 covering fish, mammals, reptiles, amphibians, invertebrates and birds.

== History ==
The park was first opened in 1986 under the name of Wingham Bird Park, with a small collection of aviary birds, waterfowl and a tea room. As new animals were added to the collection to include a variety of mammals (initially starting with farm animals such as African pygmy goats and pigs), the current, more appropriate, name of Wingham Wildlife Park was adopted in around 1996.

In February 2008, the park ownership changed hands, with the following 3 years seeing the collection grow by almost 100 new species, including numerous animals which are of high conservation interest. The changes which have been made at the park have led to the park's inclusion in the International Zoo Educators Association and the International Species Information System, in 2010. In 2012 the park even adopted the ZIMS software, which at the time was the latest addition to the ISIS software catalogue. In 2014 the park also became an associate institutional member of the South East Asian Zoos Association, further strengthening in situ conservation ties for this collection.

== Animal collection ==
=== Exhibits ===
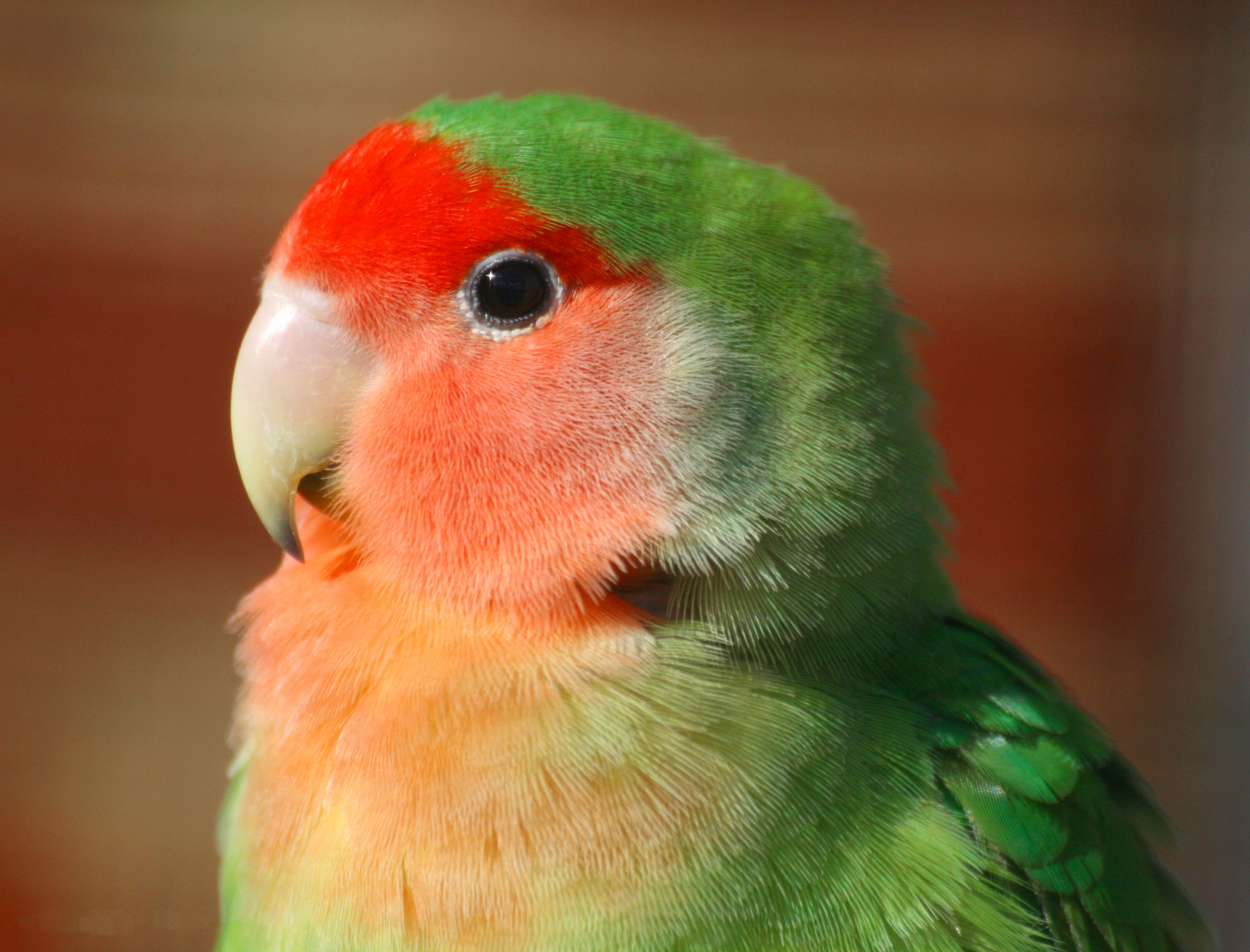
Peach-faced lovebird (Agapornis roseicollis) also known as the rosy-faced lovebird at Wingham Wildlife Park

Tropical House – The tropical house was first opened in 2004 and (including the foyer which houses the bat exhibit) covers 1100 m². This area is home to a variety of tropical plants, three ponds containing goldfish and koi carp and a variety of free roaming animals, including chattering lories, black-winged lories, white-cheeked turacos and many more.

Reptile House – Was refurbished and most of it re-built through much of 2008 through to 2010, to make the improvements required for the growth of the animal collection (from 18 species in 2008 to 46 species at the start of 2011). A wide variety of reptiles, amphibians and invertebrates are housed in the reptile collection, including western diamondback rattlesnakes, Gray's monitors, Cuban crocodiles, dwarf crocodiles, common snapping turtles, white-lipped tree vipers, rhinoceros iguanas, golden mantellas (for which Wingham Wildlife Park hold the ESF studbook) and many more.

Penguin Pool – In 2010, the park opened the only penguin exhibit in Kent. The £100,000 project consists of a pool which is serviced by a sand filtration system and automatic chlorine level control computer. There are caves built into the side of the plant room which also makes up the back to the beach area. Viewing is facilitated through the use of a raised walkway and an underwater viewing window at the deepest end of the pool. Since opening, the park has housed a Humboldt penguin colony in this exhibit. In 2014, this part of the park became the centre of international media attention, as two male penguins in the enclosure had pair bonded a number of years before and then successfully hatched and reared an egg given to them as surrogate parents after the mother abandoned the egg.

Tiger enclosure – In 2011 the zoo was offered two young male hybrid tiger cubs and an enclosure had to be built for them. This enclosure was based on the former deer enclosure and includes two separate enclosures in order to separate the brothers at feeding time. The larger of the two enclosures includes a pool, a hill for the tigers to view across the park and another viewing platform. As such, the tigers were hand-reared by the owners and their corresponding family, making them particularly friendly. They are one of, if not the, most popular animals at the park and their keeper talk at 14:30 every day is the busiest event of any day.

Big cat row – Starting from 2012, a series of big cat enclosures have been created along the top end of the park. At first, this started with the zoo's two rescued lions (Brutus and Clarence) and now the enclosures include cheetahs, jaguars, pumas and even some smaller species of cat, including caracals.

Wolf enclosure – In January 2013, a pack of five Eurasian wolves arrived at the park and were installed in a laked enclosure at the bottom of the park. However, their arrival was almost called off after a £3000 digger bought from eBay failed to materialise. This didn't stop construction and the wolves happily arrived. Their arrival was influenced by visitors' suggestions and pleas to see the species up close, which is facilitated by the glass viewing window into the enclosure.

Chimp House – In December 2015, the park opened a new house, which was built on the site of the former parrot house. This £1 million pound project is the biggest and most expensive project in the park's history and was built to house a group of seven laboratory chimpanzees that were donated from the Yerkes Primate Center. Viewing is from a two-level area, which includes an outdoor covered enclosure and two indoor enclosures, followed with six offshow dens. The ground floor has views of both the outside and insides enclosures, however, the first floor has higher viewing windows of the onshow areas but also includes a group of permanent enclosures for other residents of the park, such as a sloth and tamarins.

=== Species ===
At the start of 2013, the park was home to over 200 species, including amazon parrots, capybaras, Chilean flamingos, cockatoos, Cuban crocodiles, eastern green mambas, Egyptian fruit bats, Gila monsters, koi carp, kookaburras, lories, macaws, Mandarin ducks, Nile crocodiles, northern white-cheeked gibbons, pink-backed pelicans, reindeer, silvery-cheeked hornbills, striped skunks, spiny turtles, smooth-coated otters, tigers and Vietnamese pheasants. Since then the park has grown even more. The following section is intended to provide a rough idea of the current holdings for the park from the main animal groups:

Birds – As the park started as a bird park and with the current owner's love of birds, there are a variety of bird species held at the park, including great white pelicans, European white storks, cockatoos, Eurasian eagle-owls, peregrine falcons, kookaburras, emus, Humboldt penguins, silver pheasants, guinea fowl, chickens, blue and yellow macaws, green-winged macaws, and military macaws.

Mammals – The mammal species held at the park include goats, llamas, Brazilian tapirs, Rothschild giraffes, chipmunks, rats, Northern Luzon giant cloud rats, red pandas, meerkats, rabbits, guinea pigs, wallabies, deer and Haggis the Pygmy hippopotamus.

Carnivores – The carnivores include lions, Bengal tigers, jaguars, pumas, cheetahs, smooth coated otters, Asian short-clawed otters, Asiatic black bears, Eurasian wolves and pardine genets.

Primates – The primate species include ring-tailed lemurs, red ruffed lemurs, white-cheeked gibbons, mandrills, squirrel monkeys, barbary macaques, brown capuchins, vervet monkeys, emperor tamarins, cotton-top tamarins, chimpanzees and Bornean orangutans.

Reptiles and Amphibians – The reptile and amphibian species currently held at the park include tortoises, turtles, various species of Cuban crocodiles, dwarf crocodiles, royal pythons, western hognose snakes, Russian ratsnakes, panther chameleons, various species of frogs, Gray's monitors, gila monsters, rhinoceros iguanas and many more.

=== Notable species ===
Gray's monitors were introduced to the collection in 2010, becoming the only Gray's monitors on display in a British zoo, and one of only two zoos in Europe. These very specialised lizards are a focal point of the direction which the reptile house at the park is heading in, and at 2 years of age at the time of arrival it will be a number of years before the park can try to achieve the first breeding of this species in Europe. The collection currently has a pair of this species to try to achieve this.

Little red flying foxes came to the park in 2010 in the form of two pairs, which live in the foyer of the Tropical House alongside a group of Egyptian fruit bats (Rousettus aegyptiacus). These four individuals are the only ones of this species on display in a European zoo.

Julian the ring-tailed lemur became one of the park's most well known animals when he started his own Facebook page on 20 May 2011. Julian was just one of the inhabitants of the popular walk-through ring-tailed lemur exhibit at the park. In contrast to most lemur walk-through enclosures which tend to be single-sex groups, Wingham use a mixed-sex group in their exhibit and have successfully bred this species every year since 2008. Julian was put to sleep in January 2016 after his health started to deteriorate.

As of 2013, the park became the home of the only six Spix's night monkeys outside of South America. These animals are on display by the tropical house and are being used as a flagship species both by Wingham Wildlife Park and Colombian charity Fundacion Entropika, to raise awareness of rainforest destruction along the Colombian / Peruvian border. The park even sells a free dried yellow chili found in the rainforest of Colombia to raise awareness and funding for the native people of Colombia who cultivate this chili as an alternative income over capturing night monkeys.

As of 2016, Wingham Wildlife Park is one of three zoos worldwide currently displaying Pardine genets (according to Zootierliste).

=== Rescue projects ===
The staff and owners at Wingham Wildlife Park have always striven to take part in rescue projects since they took the park over in 2008 and have since worked with organisations such as the AAP Foundation in the Netherlands and Tonga Terre d'Accueil in France, as well as a number of individual projects. These projects are mainly self-funded by the park, however help has been given in the larger projects by members of the public, through fund raising events.

The largest rescue which the park has been involved in culminated in January 2012 with the arrival of Clarence and Brutus the lions. These two lions had been rescued six months prior to arrival at Wingham Wildlife Park by Tonga Terre d'Accueil, which is run by Espace Zoologique Saint Martin la Plaine. They had been seized by the French authorities from a circus where they had been mistreated to the point where both were dangerously underweight and one had sustained injuries which have left him scarred for life.

A further notable rescue project was the park's first major project in 2009. In conjunction with the AAP Foundation, a group of five Barbary macaques made up of the individuals Filipo, Momo, Jo, Nancy and Memouna made their way to a purpose-built enclosure in the park. All 5 animals came from a background of being kept in private homes via the illegal pet trade. Due to poor care in their past, both Filipo and Nancy suffered irreversible damage to their limbs and posture due to poor diet and being kept in small bird cages for many years.

In 2010, Wingham Wildlife Park were involved in their most long distance project when ten primates (six tufted capuchins and four squirrel monkeys) were flown to the park from the Israeli Primate Sanctuary Foundation, based in Kfar Daniel, Israel. These animals had been seized from illegal breeders for the pet trade, while others came from a legal controlled breeding programme.

== Gallery ==
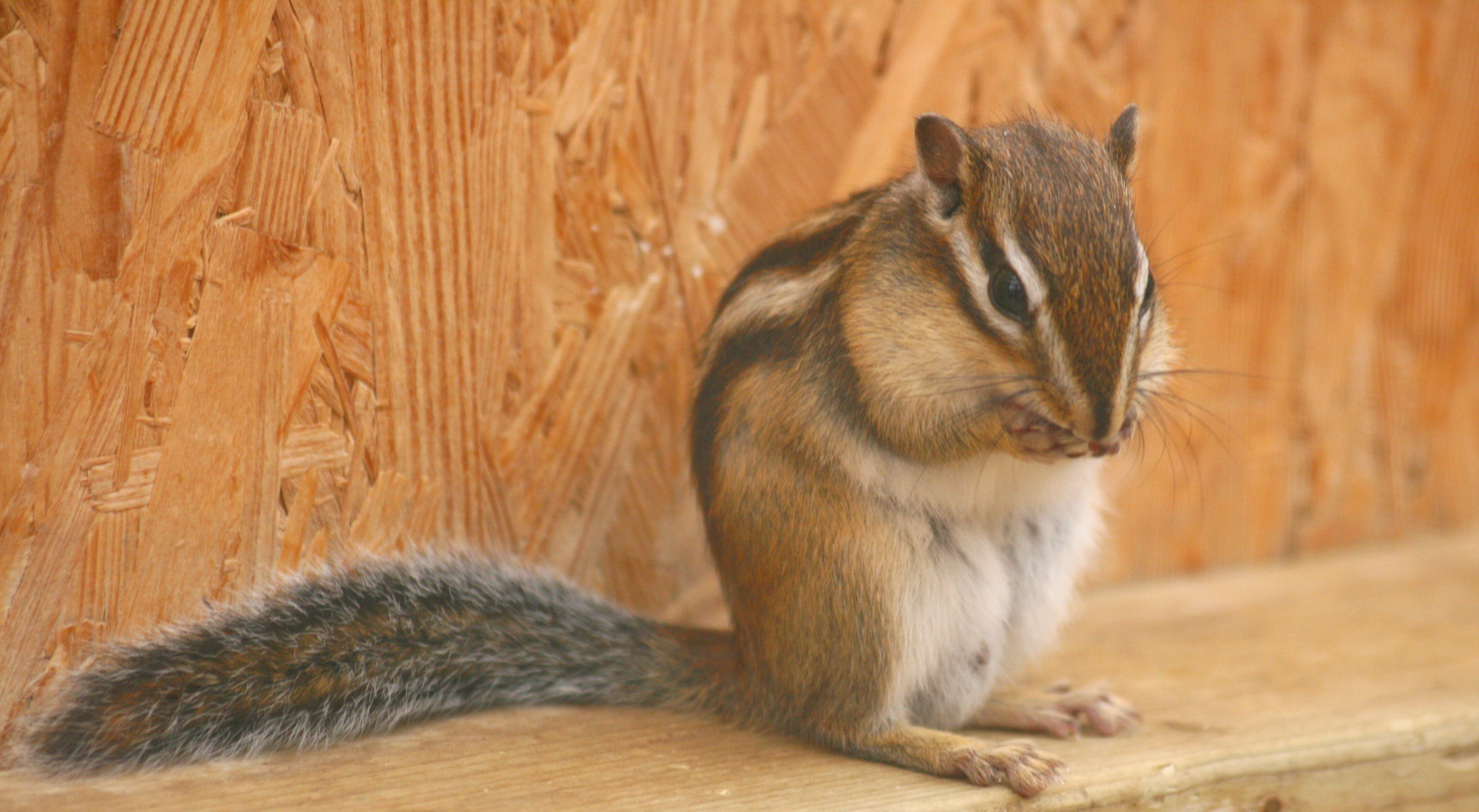
Eastern chipmunk

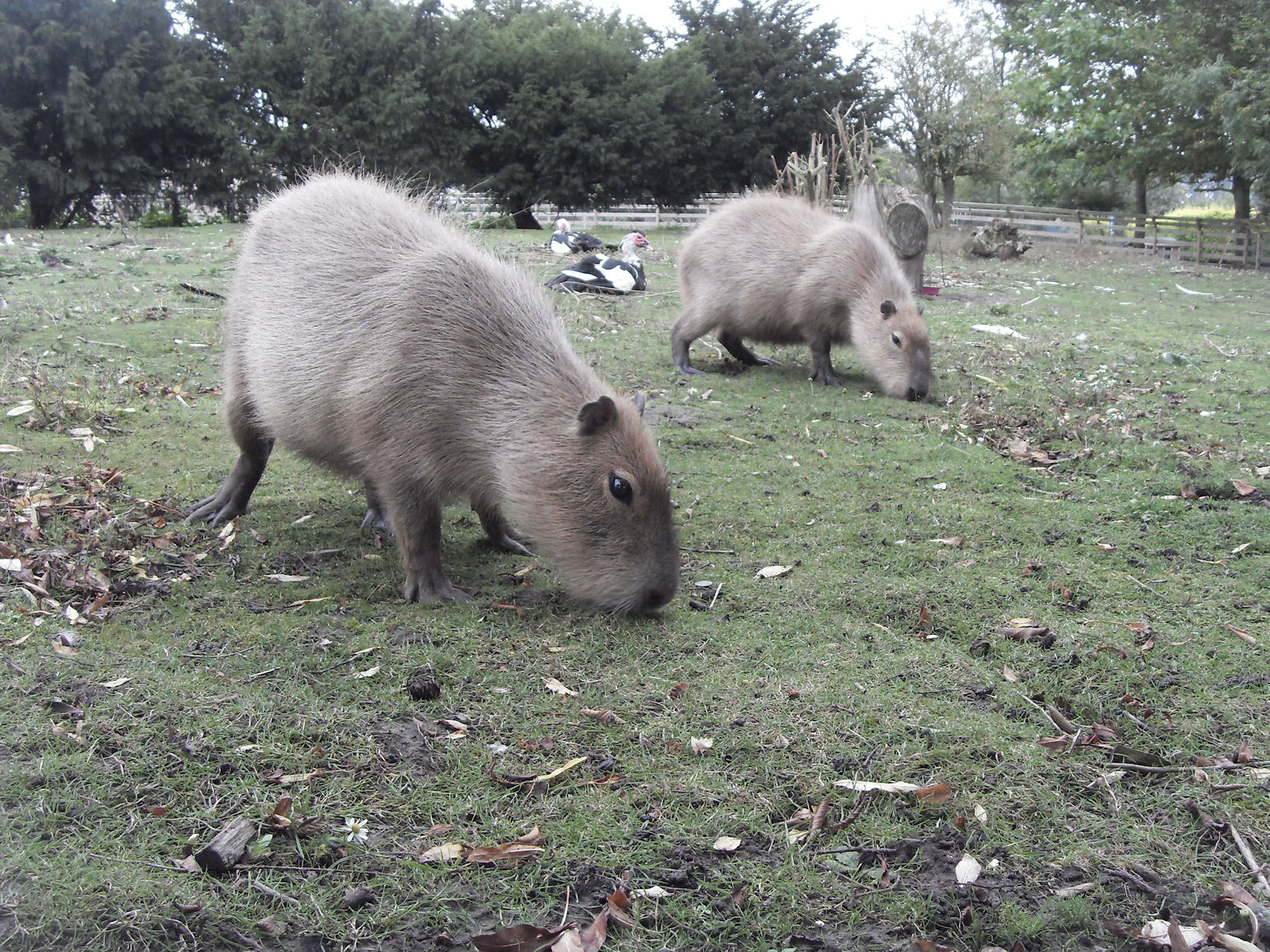
Capybara taken at Wingham Wildlife Park

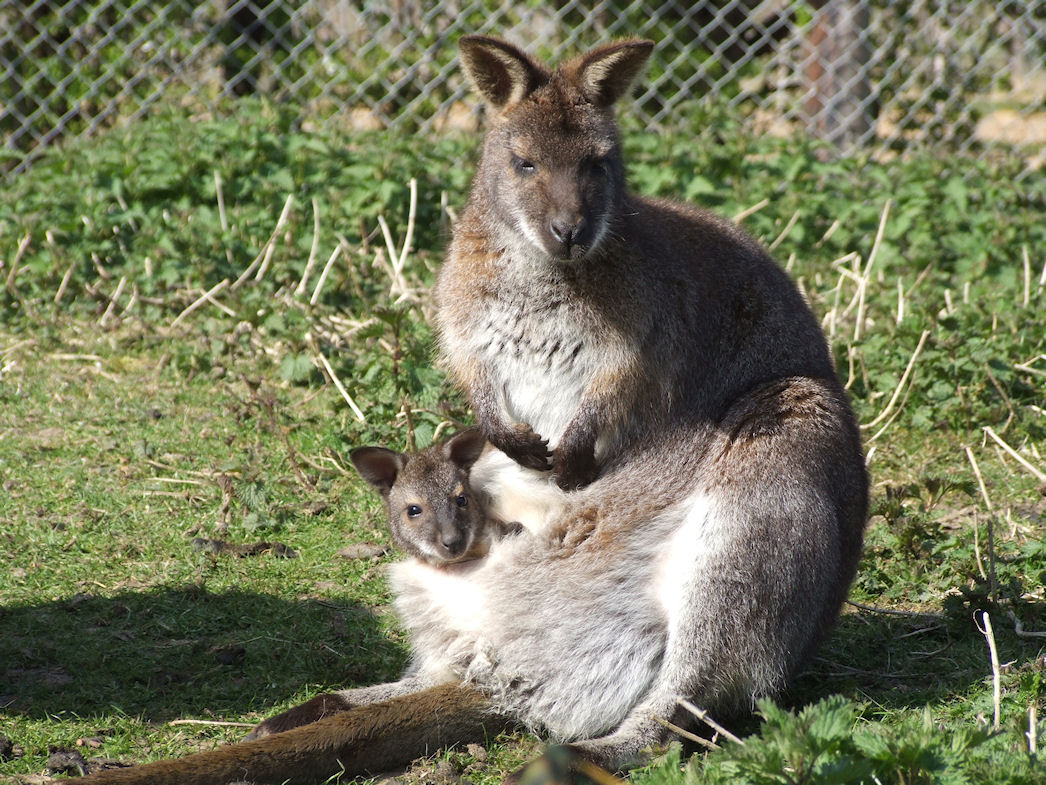
Bennetts wallaby with joey

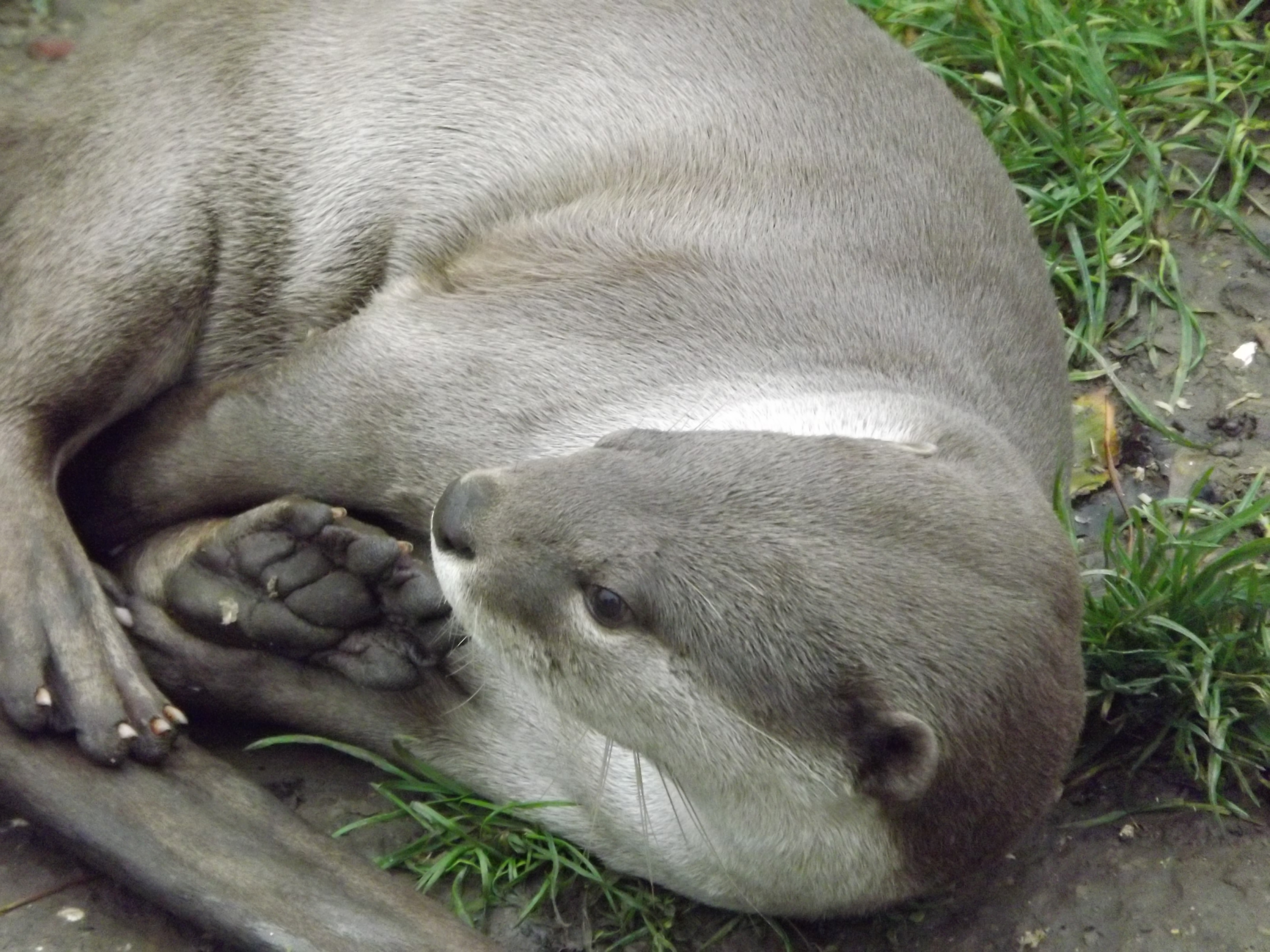
Smooth coated otter

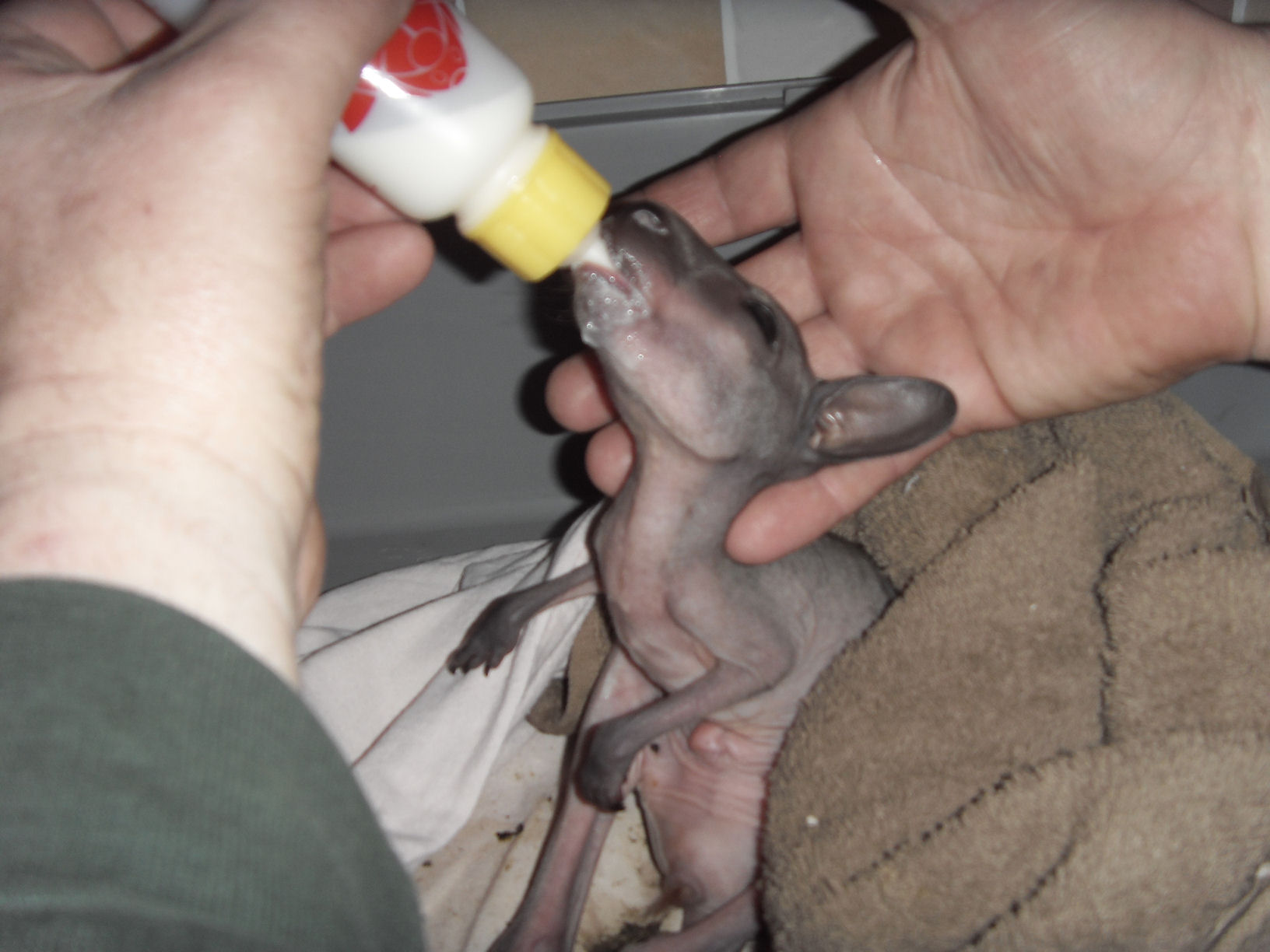
Bennetts wallaby joey being hand reared

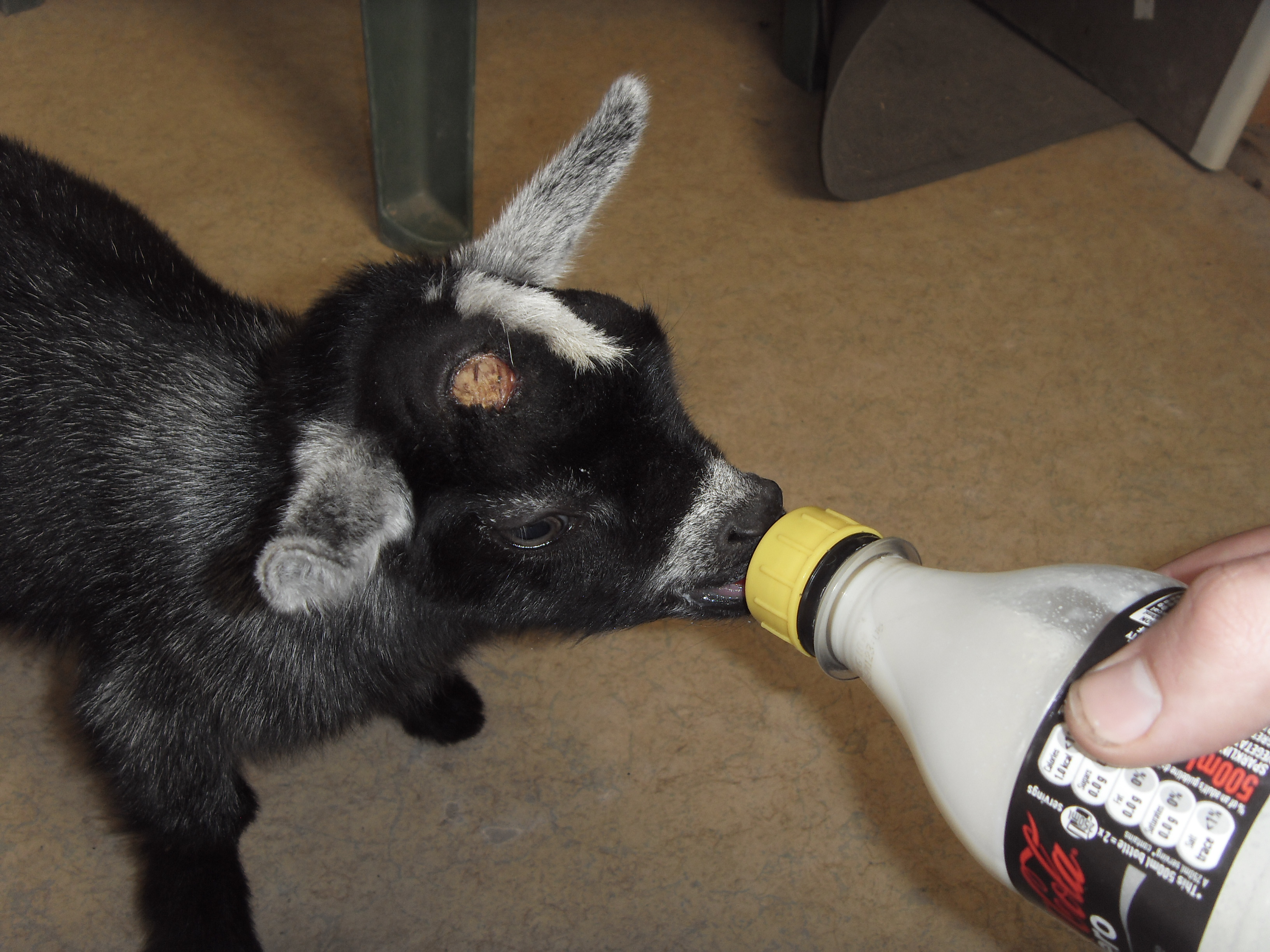
African pygmy goat being hand reared

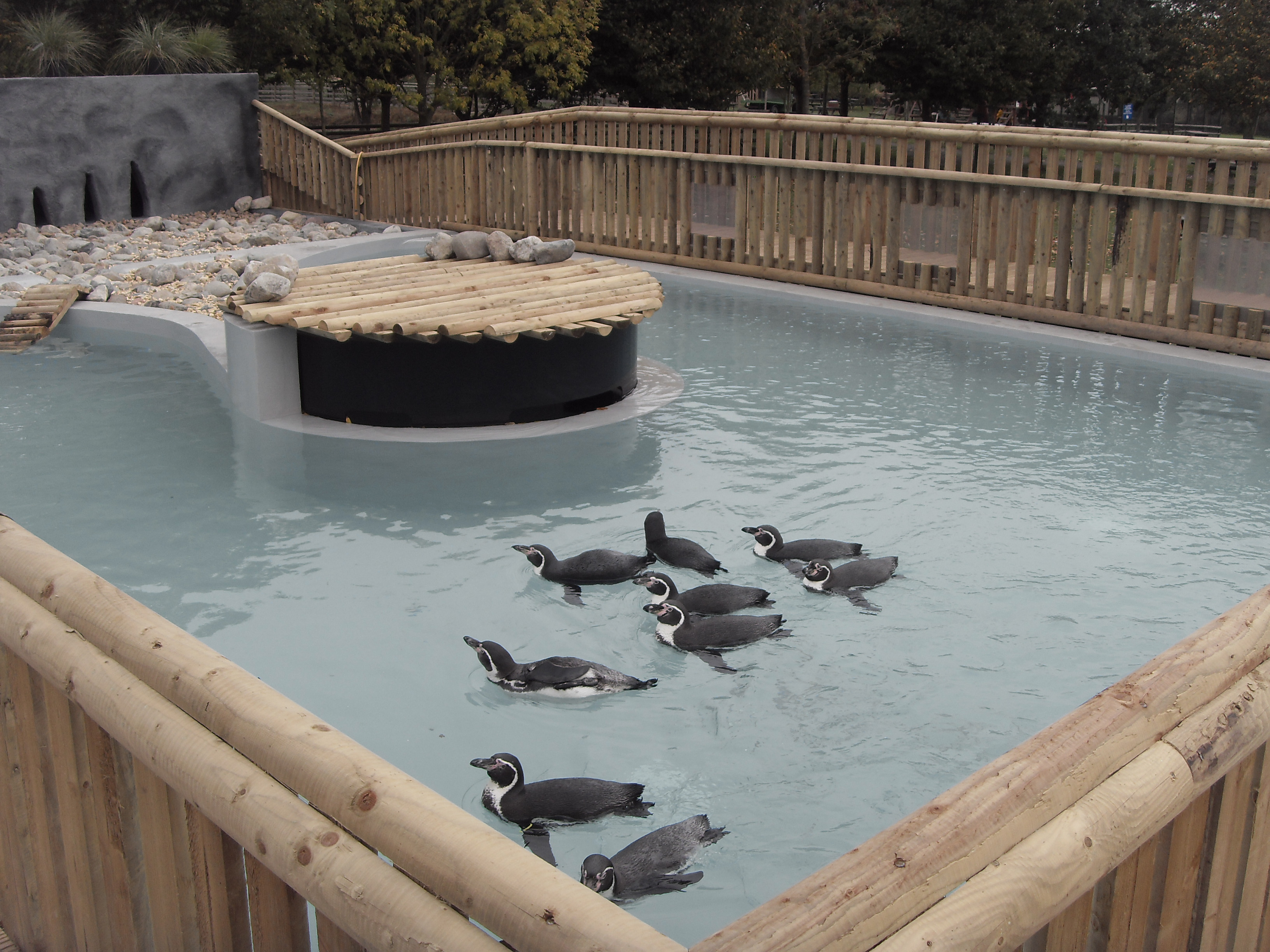
Humboldt penguin enclosure

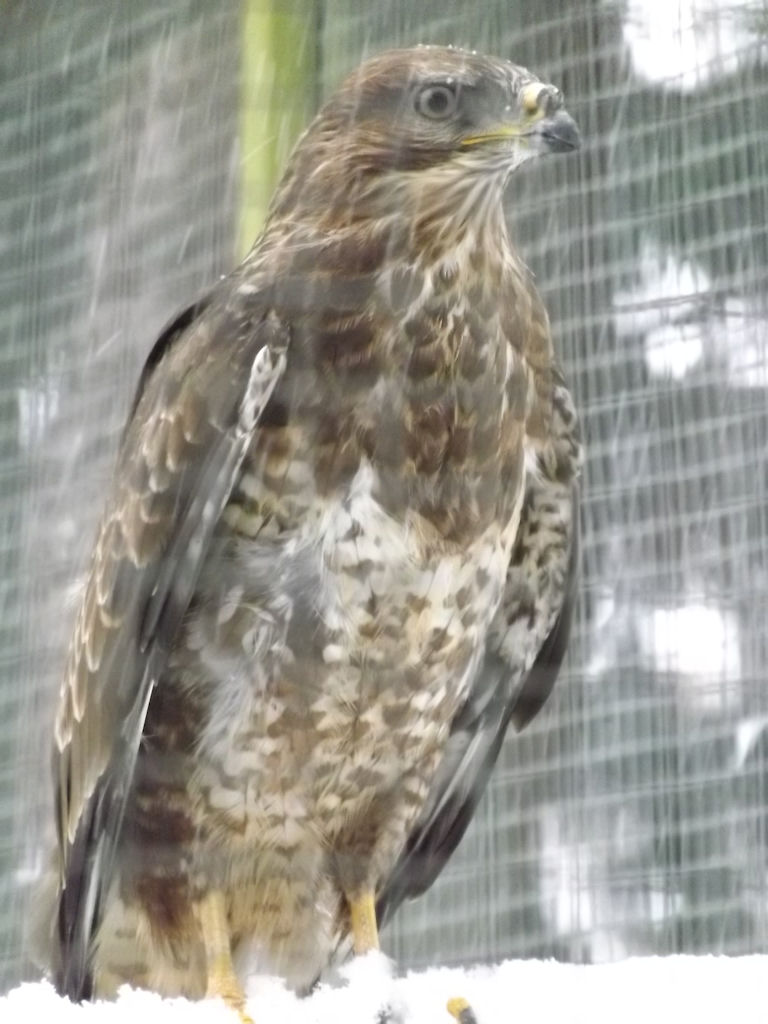
Common buzzard in the snow

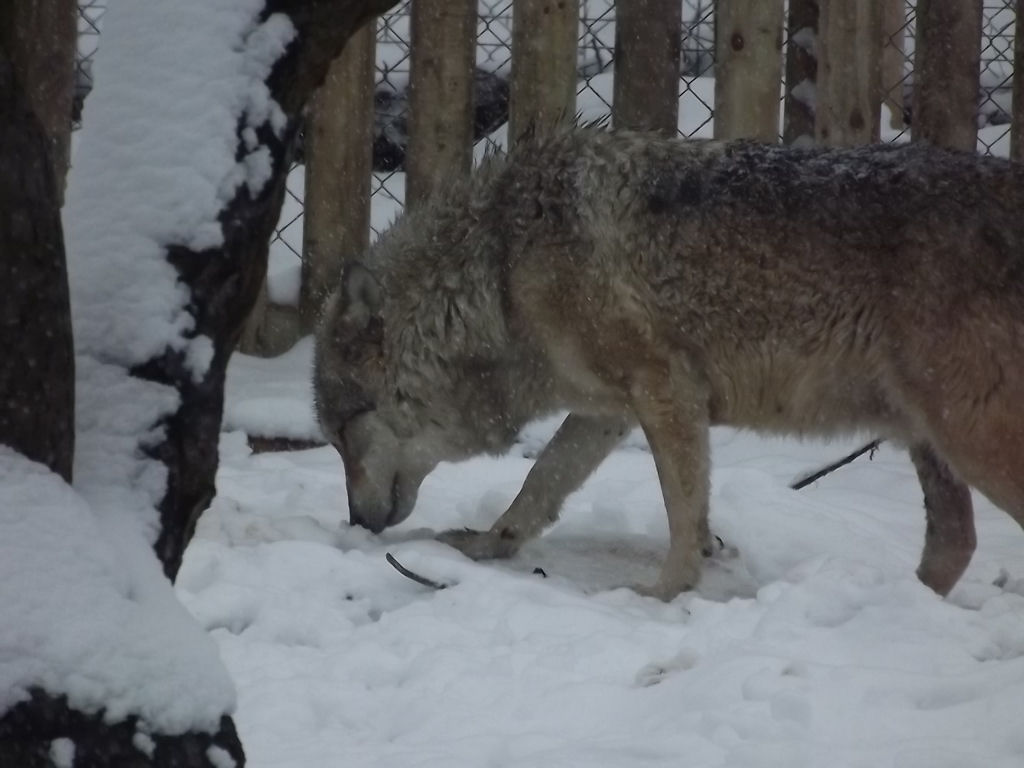
European wolf in the snow

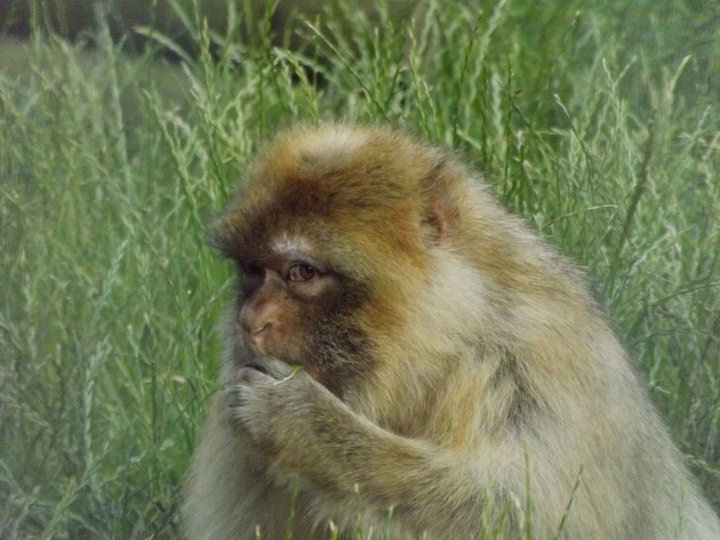
Barbary macaque

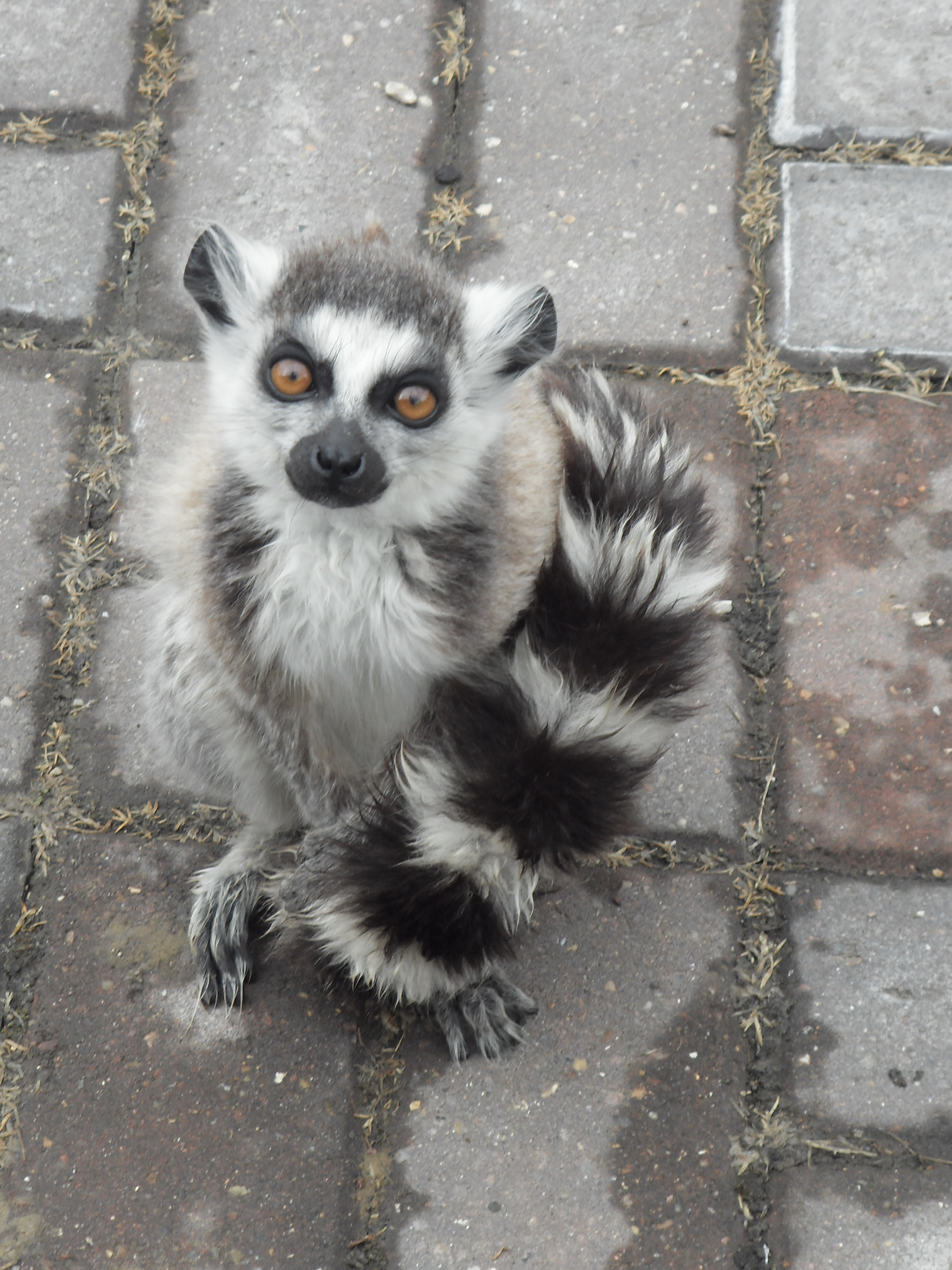
Julian the ring tailed lemur

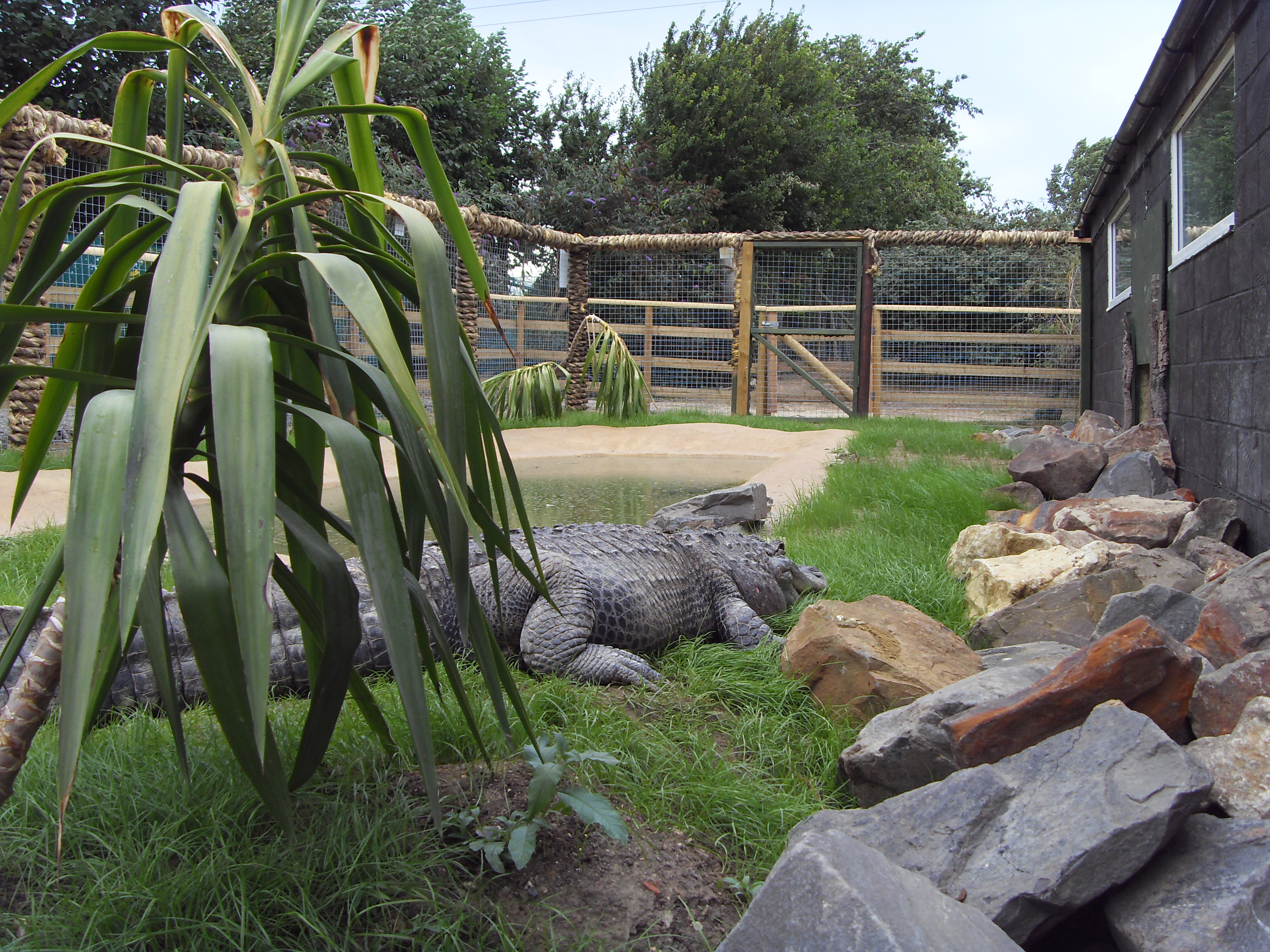
Outdoor crocodilian enclosure

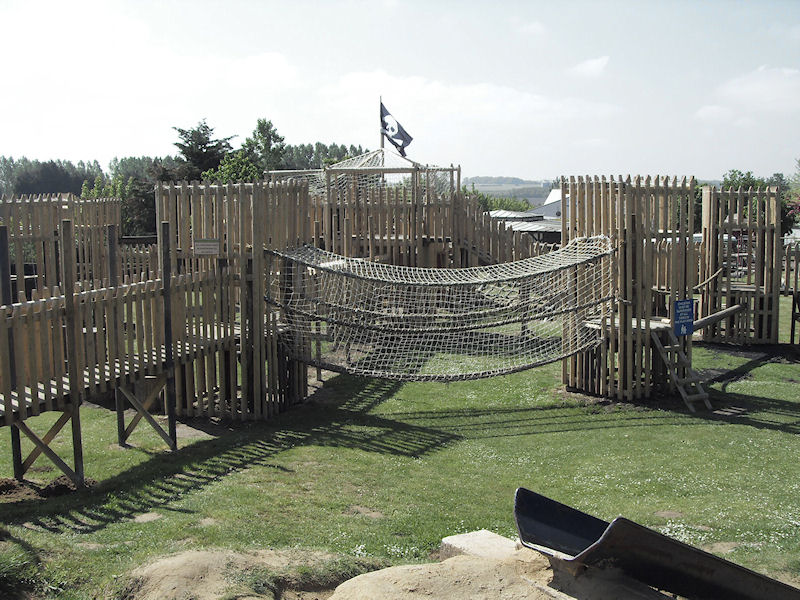
Outdoor play area

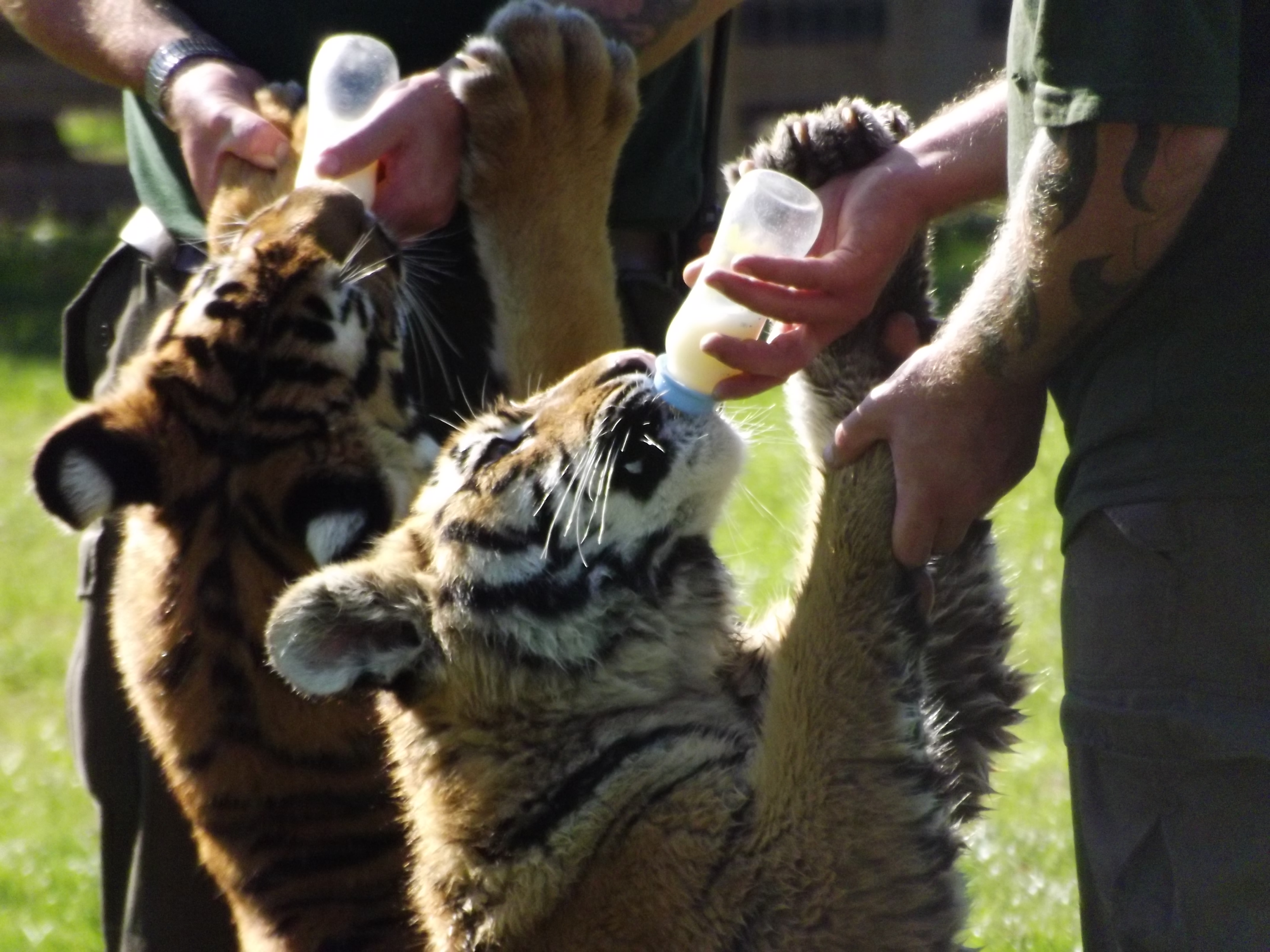
Tigers being hand reared

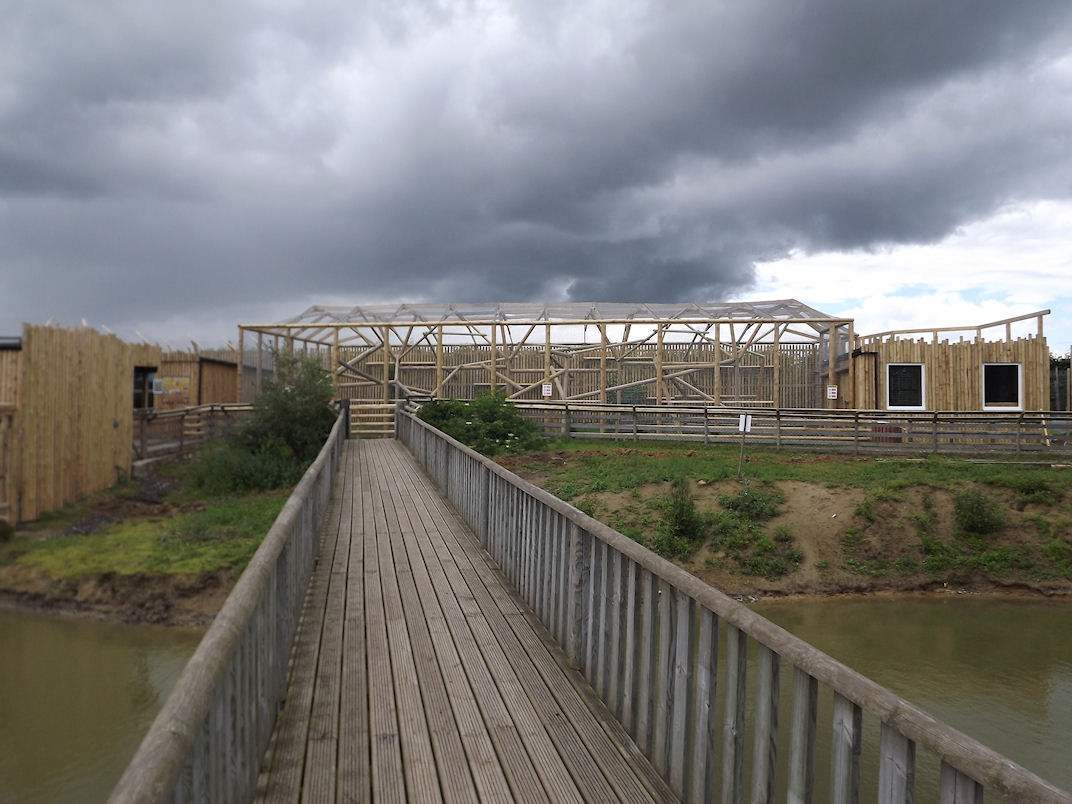
View of the jaguar enclosure

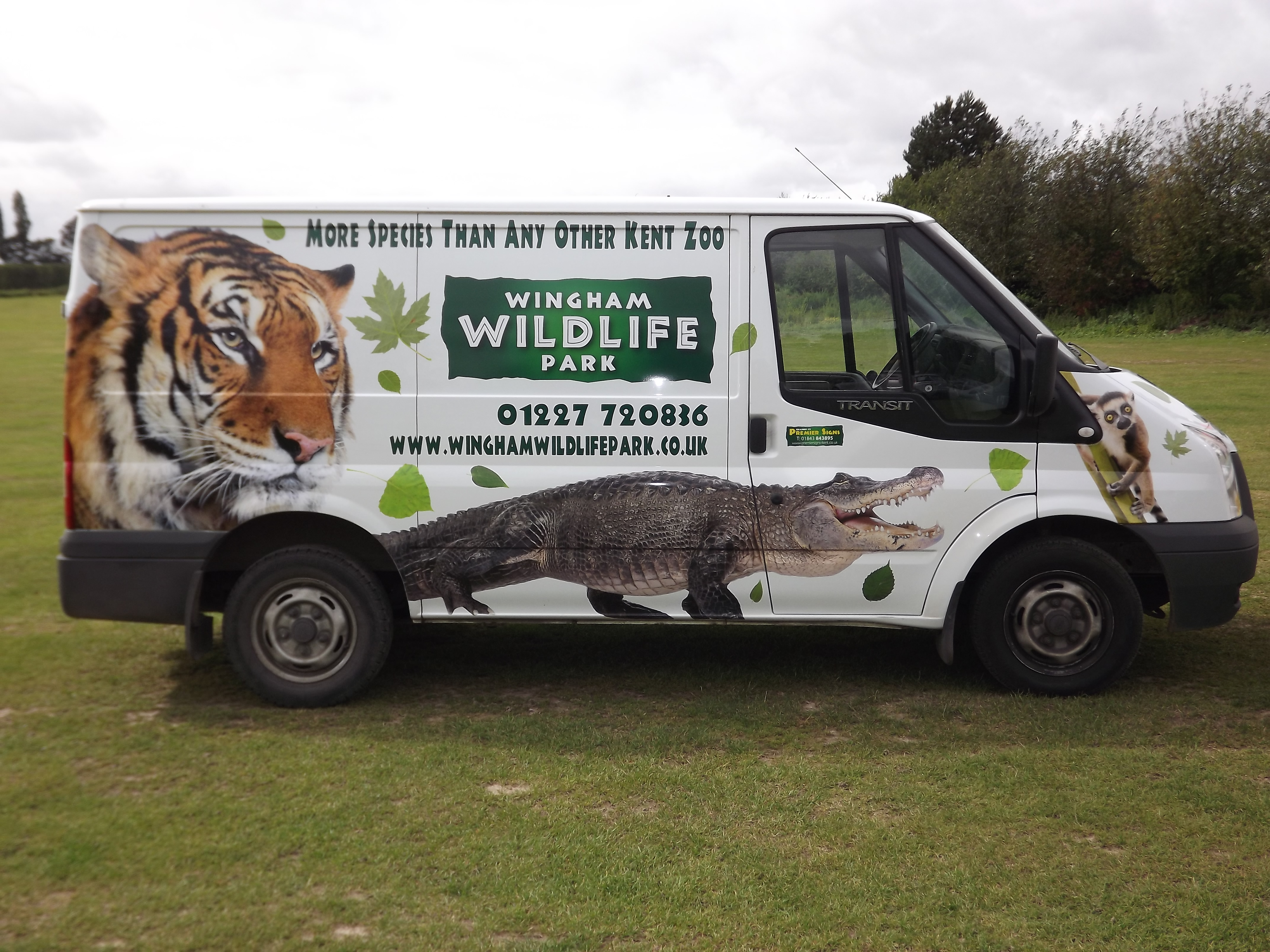
Vehicle used

== Visitor facilities ==
Since 2008 a lot of changes, improvements and additions have been made to the park, to ensure not only the successful keeping of their livestock collection but also to ensure that visitors are kept comfortable during their time at the park. Improvements to outdated facilities included a complete renovation of the main toilet block, replacement of the outdoor adventure play area and the continued improvement of footpaths. In 2016 new tarmac footpaths were installed in the main areas of the park to improve access for disabled visitors and those with pushchairs. The outdoor play area was also updated in 2016 to make it safer for both younger and older children, including an updated softer substrate. A permanent dinosaur area behind the outdoor soft play area was built in 2016 after a huge number of requests from visitors. The exhibit features 30 animatronic dinosaurs, information about local fossil discoveries including artefacts, a children's fossil discovery pit and their picture taken in the Jeep or peering out of giant dinosaur eggs.

New additions include work which was carried out during 2012 and the start of 2013, to allow the opening of an indoor soft play area named "Lions Den Soft Play Area" in time for Easter 2013. This centre will also replace the old refreshment kiosk, which had been a longtime feature of the adventure play area.

A further addition which opened in 2011 was the education centre, which was created as a renovation of the old soft bill aviary. The pheasants and kookaburras which lived in the soft bill aviary were moved to a new pheasantry along the front of the tropical house, while a group of Old English Game fowl from the building now join the other free-roaming animals (including peafowl, helmeted guineafowl, silver pheasant, chicken and Parma wallaby). This new centre houses a hands-on animal encounter hall in which both schools and general visitors are given the chance to hold bearded dragons, corn snake and a Chilean rose tarantula, while being given an educational talk about them. On the adjoining side there is also a museum which displays a variety of items which have been seized by HM customs at Heathrow Airport and donated to the park, a display of tribal artefacts (including genuine weaponry, tattoo kits and replica shrunken heads), displays of bones, feathers, eggs and fossils, along with an alligator skin which visitors are able to touch.

There is a café which serves both hot and cold meals and drinks, as well as a variety of snacks, next to a gift shop, which are located in the main reception building on the park. This building has been at the park since it was first opened, and was updated at the end of the 2013 peak season to include a brand new reception, gift shop and café.
