= Varanus (Philippinosaurus) =

Scientific classification
- Kingdom: Animalia
- Phylum: Chordata
- Class: Reptilia
- Order: Squamata
- Suborder: Anguimorpha
- Family: Varanidae
- Genus: Varanus
- Subgenus: Philippinosaurus

Species
- Varanus bitatawa; Varanus mabitang; Varanus olivaceus
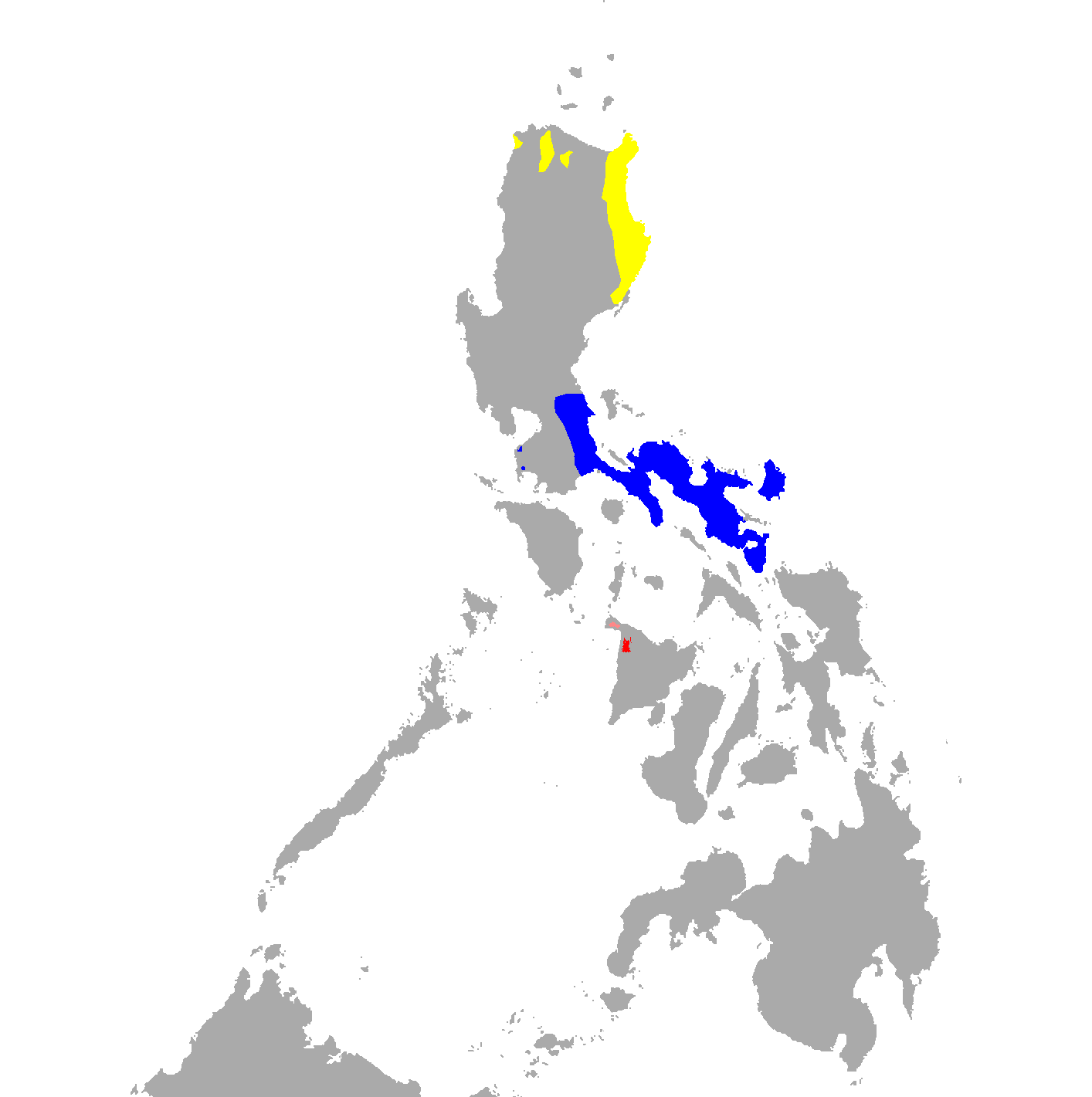
- Distribution of: Red: Varanus mabitang; Yellow: Varanus bitatawa; Blue: Varanus olivaceus

Subgenus of reptiles

Philippinosaurus is one of the 11 subgenera of the genus Varanus. The group consists of three frugivorous species endemic to the Philippines.

A fossil monitor species, †V. hooijeri from the Holocene of Flores, is closely affiliated with this clade and is also interpreted as being frugivorous.

== Feeding habits ==
Unlike other members of the Varanus genus, species belonging to Philippinosaurus are frugivorous. While V. bitatawa and V. olivaceus also supplement their diet of fruit with insects and snails, V. mabitang feeds exclusively on fruit.

| Species | Picture |
|---|---|
| Northern Sierra Madre forest monitor (V. bitatawa) | |
| Panay monitor (V. mabitang) | |
| Gray's monitor (V. olivaceus) | |
