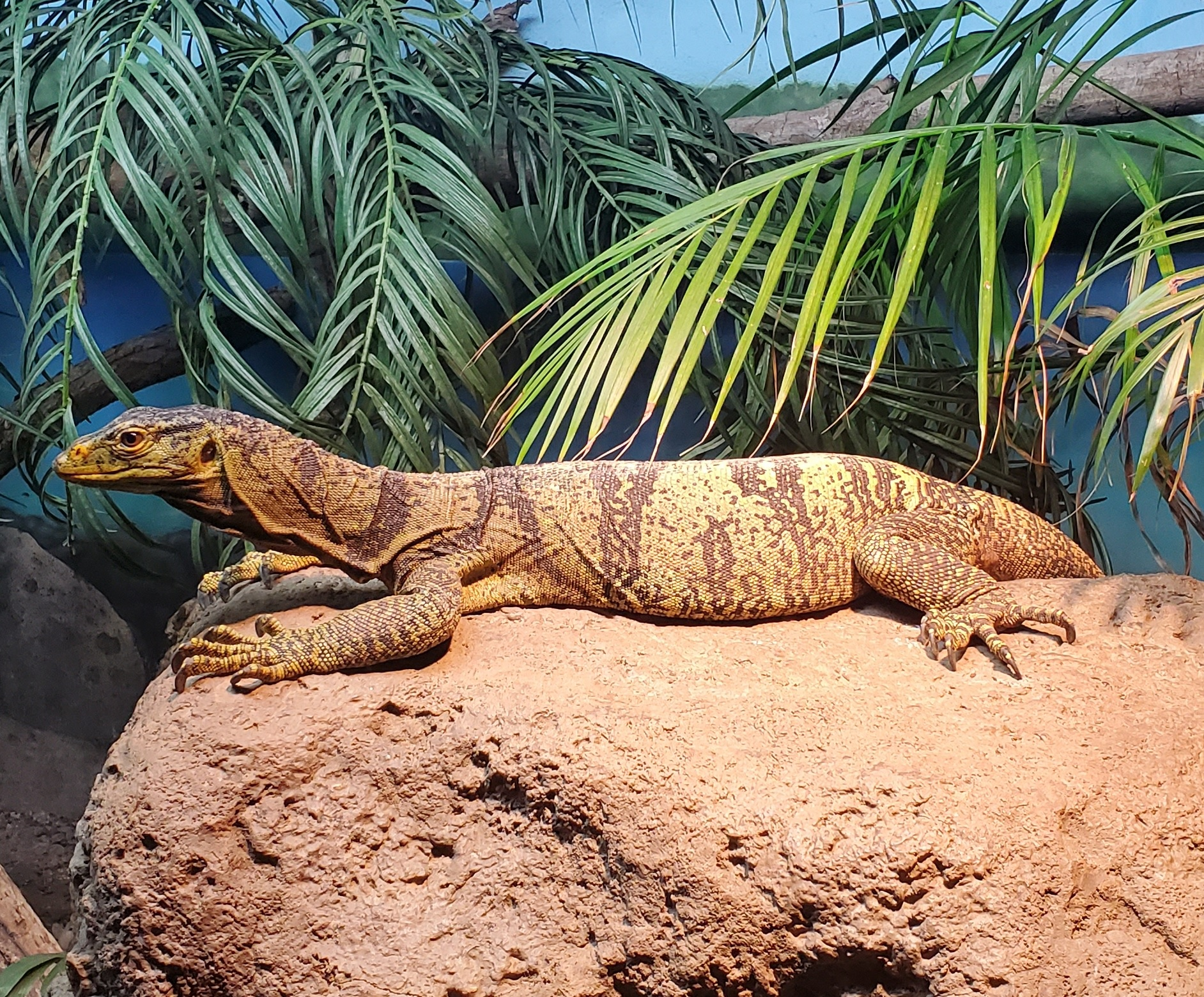
- Bronx Zoo, 2021

Conservation status
- Vulnerable (IUCN 3.1)

Scientific classification
- Kingdom: Animalia
- Phylum: Chordata
- Class: Reptilia
- Order: Squamata
- Suborder: Anguimorpha
- Family: Varanidae
- Genus: Varanus
- Subgenus: Philippinosaurus
- Species: V. olivaceus

Binomial name
- Varanus olivaceus Hallowell, 1857
- Range of Varanus olivaceus

= Gray's monitor =

Species of lizard

The Gray's monitor (Varanus olivaceus) is a large (180 cm, >9 kg) monitor lizard known only from lowland dipterocarp forest in southern Luzon, Catanduanes, and Polillo Island, all islands in the Philippines. It is also known as Gray's monitor lizard, butaan, and ornate monitor. It belongs to the subgenus Philippinosaurus. It is largely arboreal and extremely shy. The population of northern Luzon was formerly included in the Gray's monitor, but has been recognized as a separate species, the northern Sierra Madre forest monitor (V. bitatawa), since 2010.

== Ecology ==
=== Diet ===
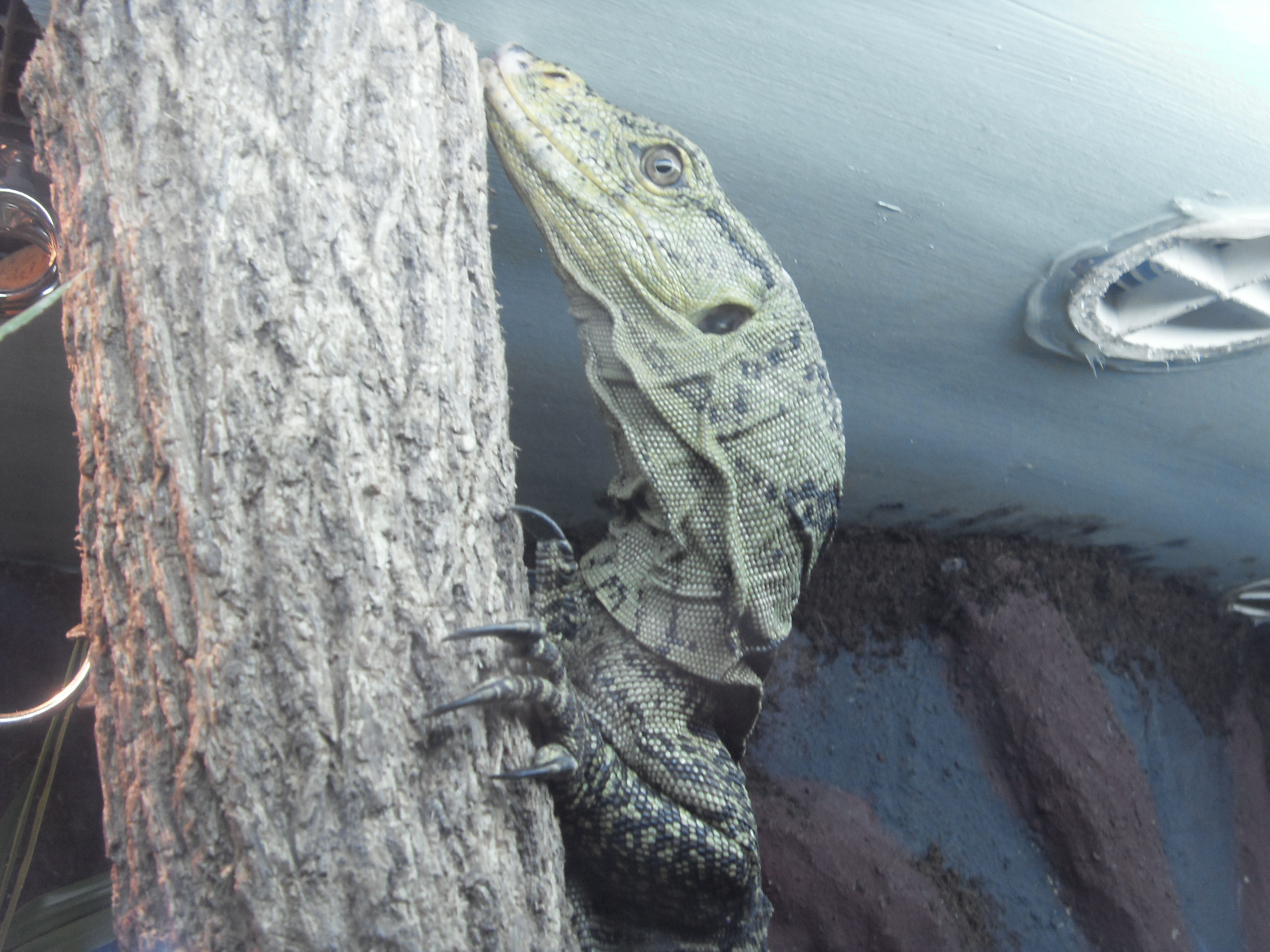
Wingham Wildlife Park, England

It is well known for its diet, which consists primarily of ripe fruit, especially Pandanus. A number of prey items are, however, also consumed, including snails, crabs, spiders, beetles, birds and eggs. Monitors are generally carnivorous animals, which makes the Gray's monitor somewhat of an exception amongst the varanid family. Such an unusual diet may be as a result of competition over food with the water monitors, which share their range. One of the only fruits readily eaten by this species in captivity is grapes, with these and fruit powder supplementing a captive diet of insects and rodents.

=== Reproduction ===
Details of the breeding habits of this species, certainly in the wild, are very limited due to the secretive nature of this species. The optimum egg-laying time for this species is known to be between July and October, when a clutch of up to 11 eggs will be laid. Rather than digging a nest, the most likely place for this species to lay eggs is thought to be in tree hollows, where they also spend much of their days resting. Young are often observed at their smallest in May to July, and as such estimates of incubation time lay at around 300 days. In captivity, however, incubation has been recorded over 219 days.

== Conservation ==
=== Threats ===
It is classed as vulnerable by the IUCN because much of its habitat has been destroyed over the last century, and it is now thought to occupy a highly fragmented area smaller than 20,000 km^{2} (7,700 sq mi). In addition to habitat destruction, they are threatened by hunting for food and illegal collection for the pet trade.

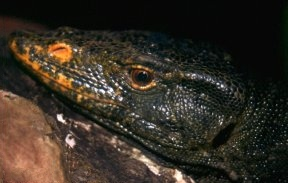
Varanus olivaceus

=== In captivity ===
This species is regularly observed being illegally sold in the Philippine pet trade.

Among others, this species is on display at the following zoos outside the Philippines:

- Los Angeles Zoo
- Oklahoma City Zoo and Botanical Garden
- Protvin Krokozoo
- Plzen Zoo
- Brookfield Zoo
- San Diego Zoo
- Bronx Zoo
- Fresno Chaffee Zoo

One Philippine zoo, Avilon Zoo, has achieved successful breeding of this species. For many years, the only report of a breeding outside of the Philippines was a single baby hatched at the Dallas Zoo in 1994, until the LA Zoo hatched them for the first time in 2015. Dallas gave their two female monitors to the Oklahoma City Zoo in May 2013.

Bronx Zoo, 2024

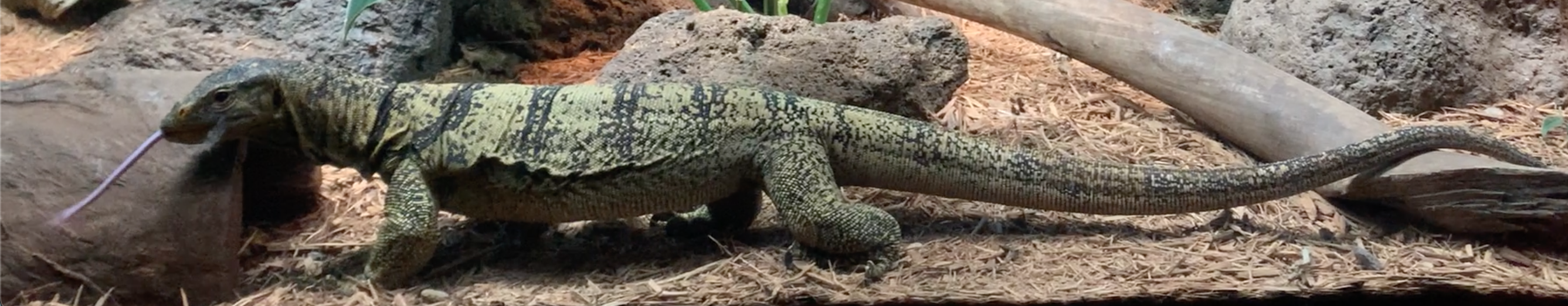
