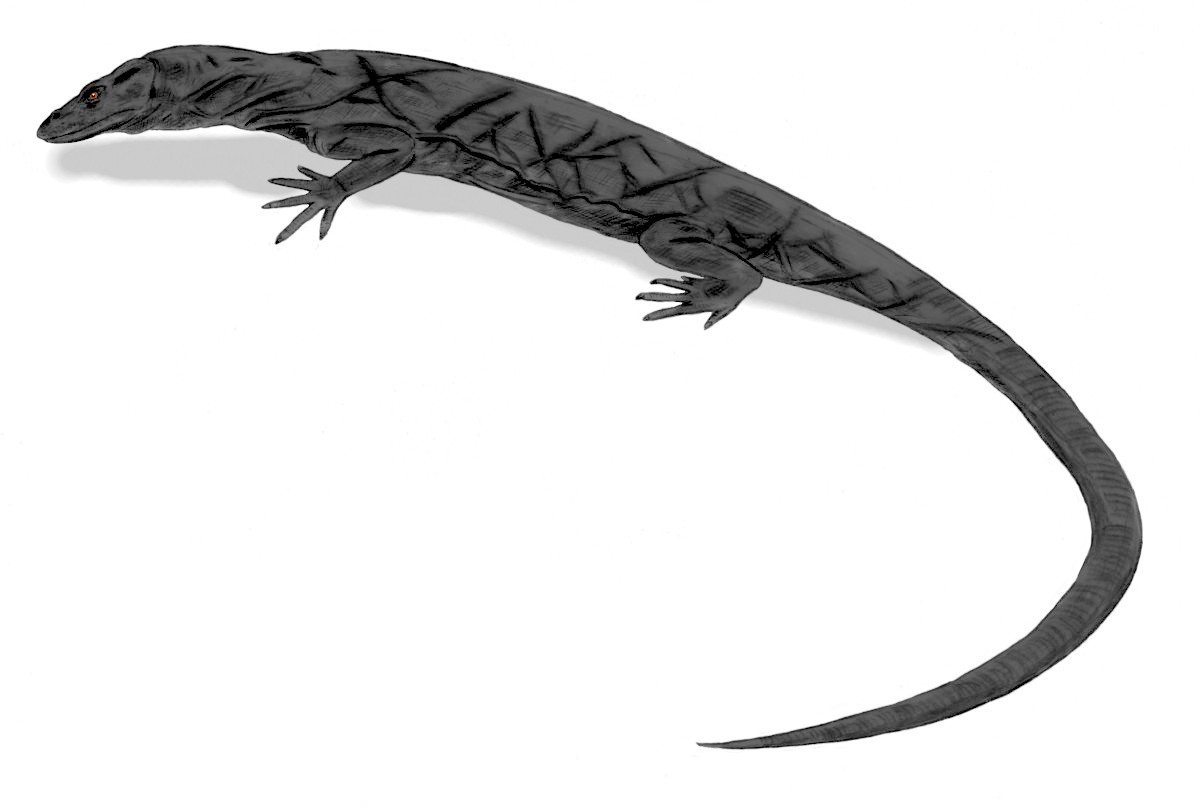

Conservation status
- Endangered (IUCN 3.1)

Scientific classification
- Kingdom: Animalia
- Phylum: Chordata
- Class: Reptilia
- Order: Squamata
- Suborder: Anguimorpha
- Family: Varanidae
- Genus: Varanus
- Subgenus: Philippinosaurus
- Species: V. mabitang

Binomial name
- Varanus mabitang Gaulke & Curio, 2001
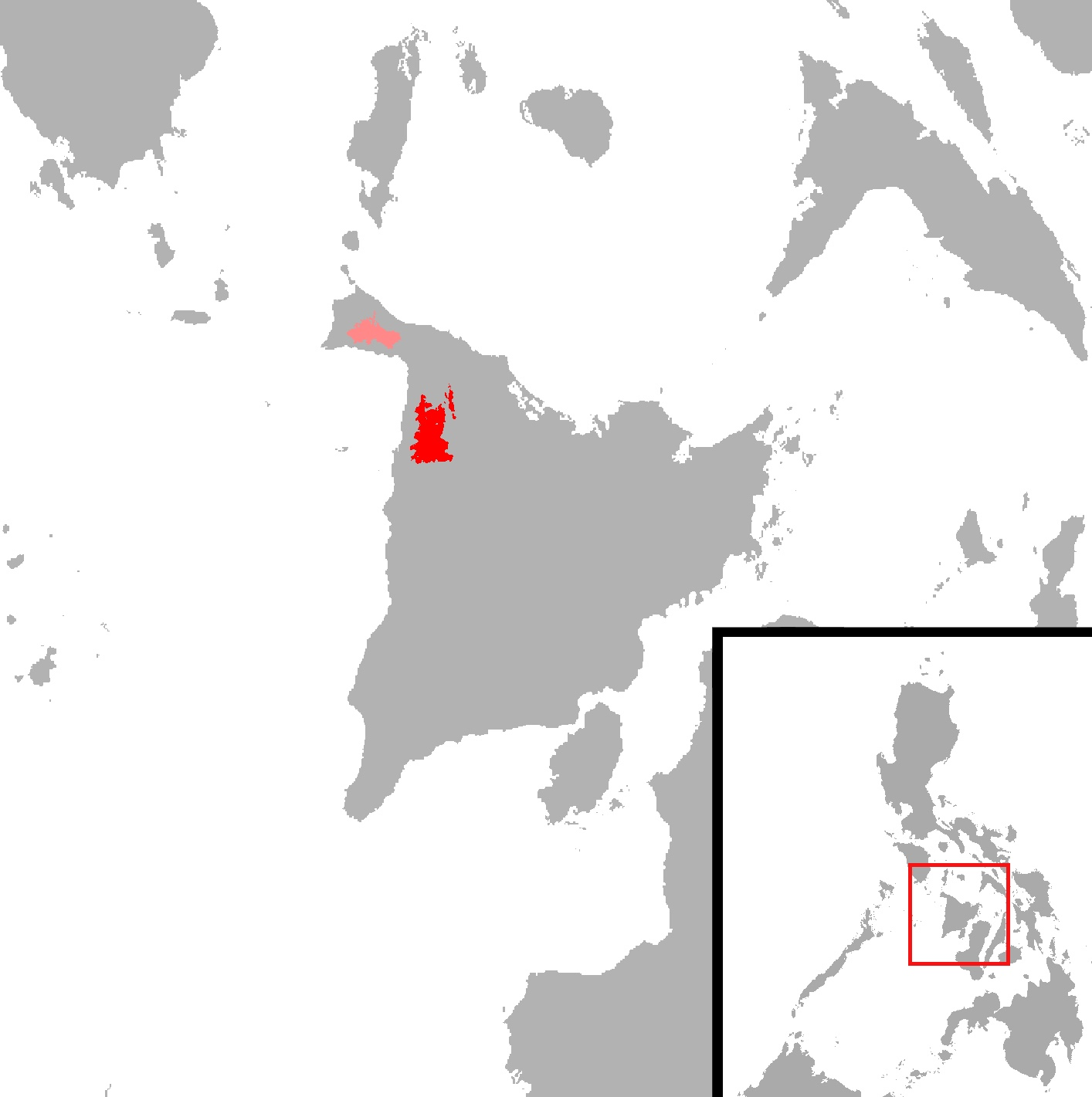
- Red: Extant Pink: Possibly extant

= Panay monitor =

Species of lizard

The Panay monitor (Varanus mabitang) is an endangered monitor lizard native to Panay Island in the Philippines. Unlike most monitors, it is a specialized frugivore.

== Distribution and habitat ==
The Panay monitor occurs only on Panay, inhabiting remnant forests in the northwestern and western mountain ranges at altitudes of 200–1000 m. It is highly arboreal and dependent on primary forest ecosystems.

== Description ==
This is a large monitor lizard with a length of 1.75 m (5.7 ft), a snout-vent length of 70 cm (28 in) and a mass of 8 kg (18 lb).

== Conservation ==
The species is classified as endangered by the IUCN. It appears to be greatly impacted by habitat loss, and is also a favoured hunting target. The species appears to be rare; only twelve animals have been caught since 2002. There are ongoing conservation efforts being carried out on the island. The species classification as Endangered is attributed to its habitat's extent of occurrence falling below 1,000 km^2 and an estimated occupancy area under 200 km^2, alongside a severely fragmented population. A notable decline is observed, primarily due to the ongoing clearance and degradation of lowland forests. Urgent conservation measures are imperative to avert further depletion and potential extinction of this species.

== Threats ==
The Panay monitor is critically threatened by habitat loss and degradation. Agricultural land conversion and illegal logging on Panay Island, particularly in its endangered lowland forest, pose imminent risks to the species.

The species faces a severe threat from rapid agricultural land conversion, primarily through slash-and-burn practices. Urgent action is needed to halt these activities and preserve the lizard's essential lowland forest habitat.

Illegal logging compounds the threat to the Panay monitor by diminishing its forest habitat and disrupting the ecological balance. The survival of the species is intricately linked to the preservation of the evergreen lowland forest, making illegal logging a significant concern.

The Panay monitor faces the risk of overhunting, despite being rarely consumed due to its scarcity. The species' low population density makes it vulnerable to exploitation, compounding the challenges in conservation. The combined threats of habitat loss and potential overexploitation underscore the complexity of ensuring the survival of the Panay monitor.
