= Komarovo =

Komarovo may refer to:

- Komarovo, Saint Petersburg, a municipal settlement under jurisdiction of Saint Petersburg, Russia
- Komarovo, name of several urban and rural localities in Russia, including
  Perm Krai
  - Komarovo, Chernushinsky District, Perm Krai
  - Komarovo, Dobryansky District, Perm Krai
  - Komarovo, Permsky District, Perm Krai
  Vologda Oblast
  - Komarovo, Vologodsky District, Vologda Oblast
  - Komarovo, Sheksninsky District, Vologda Oblast
  - Komarovo, Sokolsky District, Vologda Oblast
  - Komarovo, Borisovskoye Rural Settlement, Babayevsky District, Vologda Oblast
  Other
  - Komarovo, Altai Krai
  - Komarovo, Arkhangelsk Oblast
  - Komarovo, Puchezhsky District, Ivanovo Oblast
  - Komarovo, Voronezh Oblast

== See also ==
- "Komarovo"', a popular Russian song by Igor Sklyar and Igor Nikolayev
