= Irina Levshakova =

Russian paleontologist and artist (1959–2016)

- Ирина Левшакова
- Born: Irina Yuryevna Kuznetsova; 6 May 1959; Leningrad, Soviet Union
- Died: 31 January 2016 (aged 56); Komarovo, Saint Petersburg, Russia
- Education: Leningrad State University
- Occupations: Paleontologist, geologist, artist and musician
- Children: 3
- Relatives: Irina Linnik (mother); Yuri Linnik (uncle)

Irina Yuryevna Levshakova (Note: She was also known by the nicknames "Ira" (Ири) and "Lyalya" (Ляли), and sometimes used the last name Linnik.) (née Kuznetsova; Russian: Ирина Юрьевна Левшакова; 6 May 1959 – 31 January 2016) was a Russian paleontologist, geologist, artist and musician. She is most famous for her deep involvement in the underground rock music scene in Leningrad during the 1980s and 1990s.

As a paleontologist, Levshakova studied trionychid turtles and other reptiles. In 1986 she named a new extinct species of monitor lizard, Varanus darevskii. Levshakova also spent several years in Central Asia doing geological surveys. In 1984, Levshakova inherited the Linnik Dacha, a house in Komarovo previously owned by her grandfather Vladimir Pavlovich Linnik. She turned the dacha into a haven for rock musicians, converted one of the rooms into a recording studio, regularly held parties, and allowed bands to play concerts there. Levshakova rehearsed with several of the most famous local rock musicians of her time. In 1992 she survived a murder attempt by her then-boyfriend Fyodor Chistyakov of the band Nol.

Levshakova was also a talented artist, creating cover art for many rock albums and having her artwork shown at exhibitions in both Russia and internationally. Levshakova was in 2010 arrested for having grown the largest ever plantation of cannabis in northwestern Russia, though she was sentenced only to five years probation. She died in 2016, aged 56, due to heart failure.

== Background and early life ==
Irina Yuryevna Kuznetsova was born in Leningrad (modern Saint Petersburg) on 6 May 1959. She was born into a family of academics. Levshakova's mother was Irina Vladimirovna Linnik, an art historian specialized in Western European art. Her father, Yuri Ivanovich Kuznetsov, was also an art historian. Her grandfather Vladimir Pavlovich Linnik (1889–1984) was a famous Soviet physicist and her uncle Yuri Linnik (1915–1972) was a mathematician.

Levshakova did not grow up in her family home, the 'Linnik Dacha' in Komarovo. At the time, the dacha was owned by her physicist grandfather, who did not like small children since he thought they interfered with his work. She instead spent her early years with her uncle Yuri. Yuri's house was also a dacha in Komarovo, which he had built himself.

Levshakova was in her youth considered a hippie, a lifestyle frowned upon in the Soviet Union. Her acquaintances later described her as beautiful but also unusual in that she smoked and sometimes used obscene language. After the intervention of some of the adults, she reportedly "corrected herself"; in 1977 she was married and also began to study at the Leningrad State University. Her first marriage was to Sergey Levshakov. Already in the same year of their marriage, Levshakova at the age of eighteen had the twin sons Vladimir and Mikhail. For most of her adult life following the first marriage, she used the name Irina Levshakova.

== Academic career ==
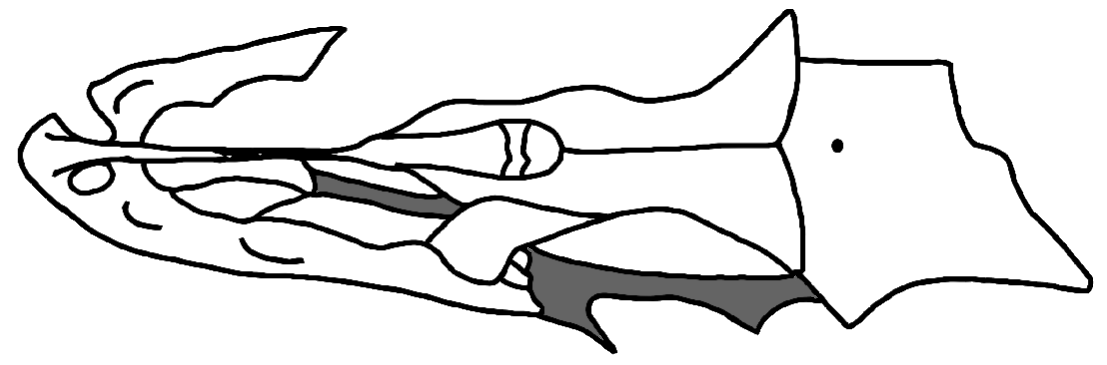
Drawing of the skull of Varanus darevskii (top view), an extinct species of monitor lizard named by Levshakova

Levshakova was a paleontologist and geologist. She studied at the Department of Palaeontology at the Leningrad State University under Lev Isaakovich Khosatzky, a well-known Soviet zoologist and paleontologist specialized in turtles. During her studies Levshakova wrote two unpublished student works (supervised by Khosatzky) on trionychid turtles, one on trionychids from Late Cretaceous Fergana (1980) and one on trionychids from Cretaceous and Paleogene Mongolia (1981). For her graduate thesis, Trionychids of the Cretaceous and Cenozoic of Middle Asia and Mongolia (1982), Levshakova sorted through and studied fossil bones collected by the renowned Soviet paleontologist and author Ivan Yefremov, also from Komarovo. Yefremov's material had previously been studied by Khosatzky but never published. Based on some of the bones she examined, Levshakova named two new species of the softshell turtle Trionyx. (Note: Since her Trionyx species were published in a thesis, they are not considered valid species under the rules of the ICZN; consequently no species named by Levshakova appear among the commonly recognized species of Trionyx. Her thesis did however contribute to the discovery of new species. Detailed descriptions by Levshakova of material she referred to the species Trionyx zakhidovi, now considered a nomen dubium, allowed the paleontologists Natasha S. Vitek and Igor G. Danilov to identify the new species T. kansaiensis in 2010.)

Other than her works as a student, Levshakova's contributions to palaeontology are somewhat sparse. In 1986, she named a new species of fossil monitor lizard, Varanus darevskii, based on a relatively well-preserved skull from the Early Pliocene found near the village of Sor in Tajikistan. Levshakova believed V. darevskii to be the ancestor of the modern desert monitor (V. griseus). In a 2004 interview, Levshakova jokingly described her naming of species as placing her "on par with Linnaeus".

In addition to her paleontological work, Levshakova like many Soviet scientists also spent several years in Central Asia doing geological surveys before she permanently moved back to Komarovo.

== Leningrad rock scene ==
=== Involvement in underground rock ===
Cover of the 1993 album Ne mogu konchit ("I can't come") by the band Vykhod, painted by Levshakova

From 1980 onwards, and through the 1980s an 90s, Levshakova was deeply involved in the underground rock scene in Leningrad. After the death of her grandfather in 1984, Kuznetsova moved to the Linnik Dacha, which she turned into a haven for rock musicians from throughout Russia. Her address soon became an iconic address in the rock community, transformed into the capital of the local rock underground movement and harboring a commune of like-minded people.

Levshakova turned one of the rooms into a recording studio. The dacha also began to function as a concert venue; Levshakova regularly held parties and organized apartment concerts. While active in the rock scene, Levshakova mostly went by the aliases Komarovskaya or Linnik. She rehearsed with artists such as Boris Grebenshchikov and Konstantin Kinchev. One of Grebenshchikov's songs, "Аделаида" ("Adelaide"), was dedicated to Levshakova. Another regular visitor was Alexander Bashlachev, who for a time also lived in the dacha and who last visited in February 1988, five days before he committed suicide.

Levshakova was a talented artist. She frequently painted cover art for the albums of rock bands, often with "psychedelic" watercolors. Levshakova's art was at one point exhibited at the Oslo Museum in Norway. Some of her art was also at times exhibited at exhibitions in Leningrad. According to the author Olga Zhuk, Levshakova's art was characterized by being daring and extravagant.

In early 1989 Levshakova was in England, where she recorded several programmes with the Russian-language BBC presenter Seva Novgorodsev, including a programme on 11 February in commemoration of Bashlachev and a programme on 25 February on the subject of Greenpeace and environmental issues. In the 25 February programme she was titled as both a paleontologist and an ecologist. Levshakova also unsuccessfully attempted to realize a musical project of her own during her time in England. After the disintegration of the Soviet Union in 1991, Levshakova briefly moved to England and ran environmental campaigns.

=== Murder attempt ===
Once she returned to Russia, Levshakova began a relationship with Fyodor Chistyakov, the founder of the band Nol. She starred in the music video for the band's song "The Real Indian" (Песня о настоящем индейце). Their relationship came to an end in October 1992, when Chistyakov attempted to murder her. Reportedly believing that Levshakova was a witch and an "embodiment of evil", Chistyakov put on a painted ritual skirt and borrowed an Uzbek ritual dagger from a friend. While walking down a street with Levshakova at night, Chistyakov suddenly grabbed her by the hair and began to saw her throat with the knife. Because the knife was blunt and Chistyakov stopped immediately when blood began to flow, Levshakova survived the attack. After Chistyakov ran off, a neighbor found Levshakova in the street and asked what was happening, to which she reportedly responded "Don't you see, asshole!? I've been stabbed!"

During his trial in court, Chistyakov to his own detriment attempted to defend himself by maintaining that Levshakova was a witch. Chistyakov was detained for a year at the Kresty Prison in Saint Petersburg and was then committed to a mental hospital for compulsory treatment for another year.

== Cannabis arrest ==
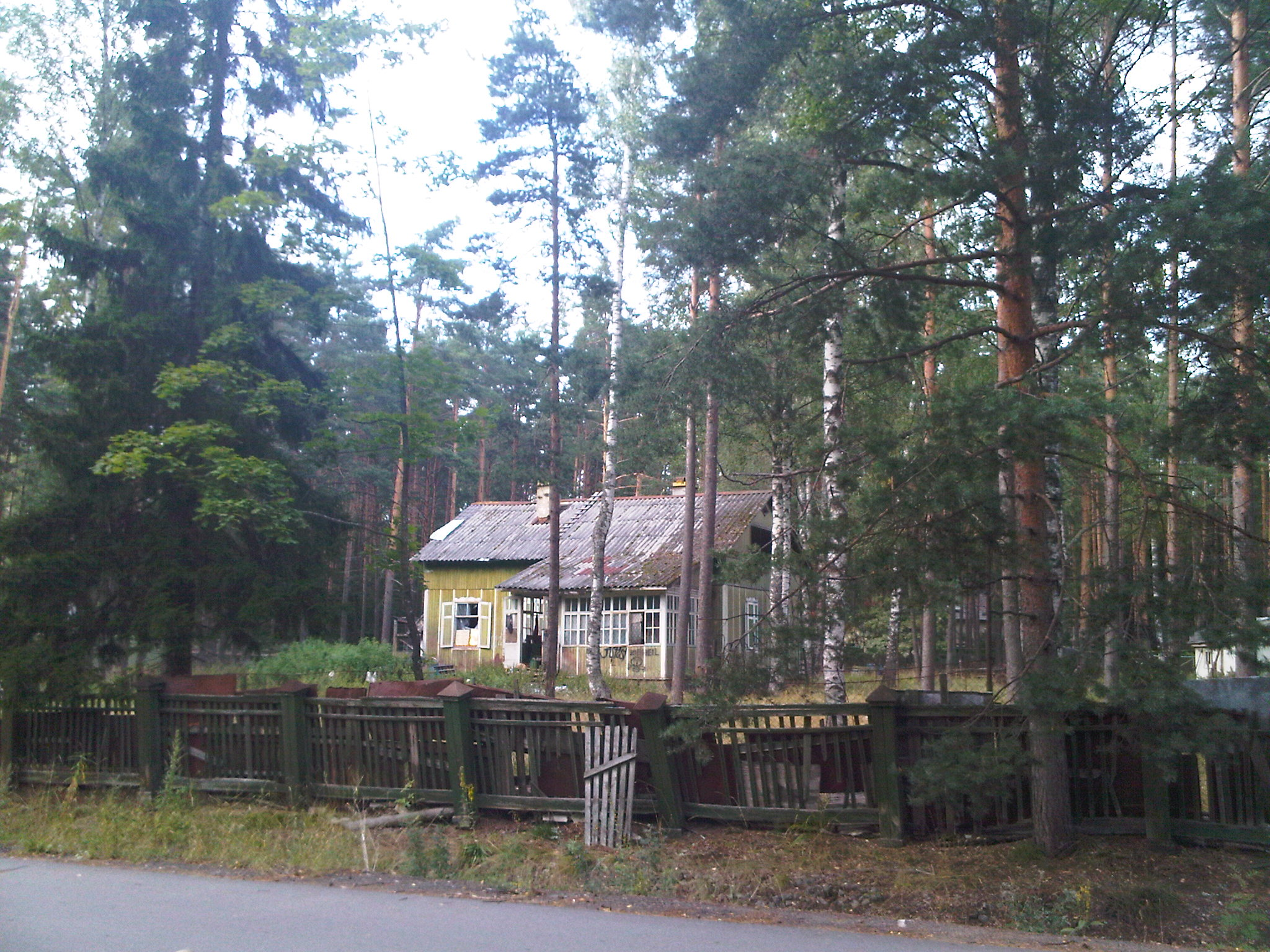
The Linnik Dacha in August 2010

Levshakova was arrested on 14 September 2010 for growing cannabis at her dacha. Her plantation was reported by the Federal Drug Control Service of Russia to have been the largest known in recent years and the largest ever cannabis plantation in northwestern Russia. In total, over 1247 bushes were found, alongside around 600 grams of already dried product and large amounts that were still being dried. Levshakova made no attempt at hiding her guilt and also confessed to having consumed marijuana for a long time. While they were cutting it down, Levshakova is reported to have yelled out to the policemen to at least let the cannabis ripen.

Levshakova was tried for the crime of storage and cultivation of drug-containing plants. Despite the size of the plantation, she received a generous sentence of five years probation, meaning that she could continue to live at home in the Linnik Dacha.

== Personal life ==
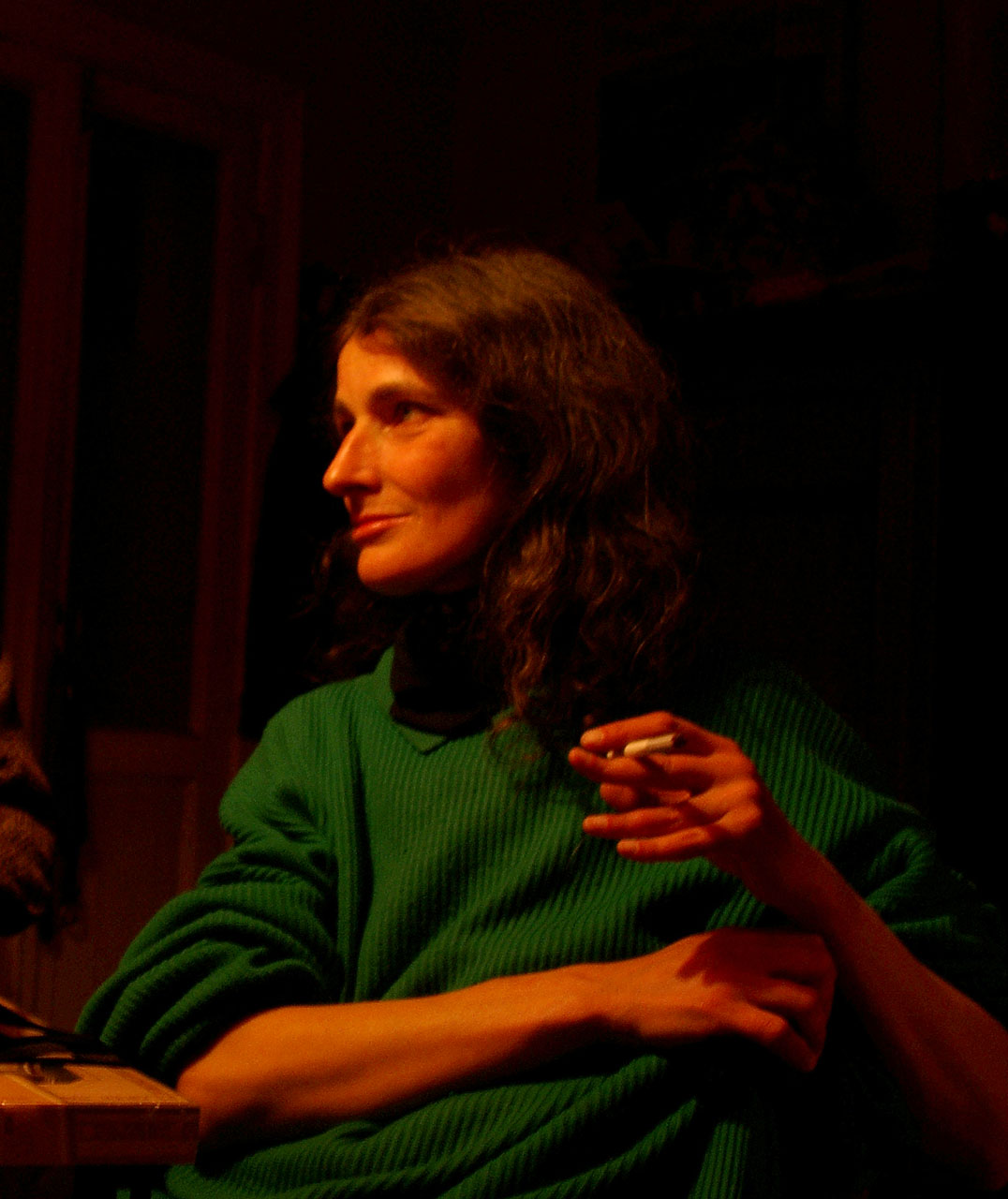
Levshakova in October 2003

In 1993, Levshakova married for the second time, marrying Georgy Dmitrievich Orbeli, an artist and the son of a doctor. The couple had a son, Dmitry (born in 1994). Orbeli hanged himself in 1997, four years after their marriage. For most of her life, Levshakova lived at the Linnik Dacha in Komarovo, often with numerous animals. In 2004, she lived with a cat, five dogs and a small herd of Saanen goats whose milk she sold to the other villagers. Levshakova's mother stayed with her at times until she died in 2009.

Opinions on Levshakova among the residents of Komarovo were sharply divided. Some considered her an important and indispensable figure in the village whereas others (like Chistyakov had) derided her as a "witch", in large part due to the bad reputation her dacha had gathered during its time as a haven for rock music and drugs. Throughout her later years, Levshakova faced repeated harassment from ill-wishers. The most notable incident saw the killing of all but one of her dogs through poisoning their food. Levshakova also had a poor relationship with her eldest sons, who had grown up largely without her. At one point the twins reportedly attempted to burn down her dacha.

Levshakova did not watch television or read books, with the exception of the works of Kozma Prutkov, which she greatly enjoyed. She listened to the Echo of Moscow and Radio Liberty radio stations. In her later life, Levshakova largely stopped listening to Russian rock since it was "not very good", instead listening to the band Gipsy Kings and to Arabic music. She regularly received Arabic records from her brothers, one of whom worked in Kuwait and another who worked as an ambassador in Baghdad. Levshakova also enjoyed writing poetry.

=== Death and tribute ===
Levshakova died of sudden heart failure on 31 January 2016, aged 56. Two days before her death, she called her long-time friend Andrei Tropillo and asked him to accompany her to buy medicines. Though Levshakova told him that she was believed she was dying, Tropillo did not give it much thought since she had often said the same before. Tropillo and Levshakova often took walks together and bought food for her dogs.

Levshakova was cremated on the morning of 9 February 2016. Half of her ashes were per her wishes scattered over Lake Shchuchye in Komarovo on 7 May through being shot out of a cannon. The other half were scattered over the grave of one of her sons. The cannon ceremony was attended by numerous artists and bands formerly part of the Leningrad rock scene and coincided with a reunion festival of such artists and bands held in Saint Petersburg from 1 to 6 May. Among the attendees were Tropillo, Sergei Selyunin and his band Vykhod, Evgeny Titov and his bands Avtomaticheskie udovletvoriteli and Atskiye Uskoriteli, as well as Pispiska Style, a group composed of several of Levshakova's former close associates.

== Legacy ==
Levshakova continued to be remembered by the residents of Komarovo after her death, with some claiming that the Linnik Dacha remained "cursed" and "inhabited by an immortal witch".

In 2023, Natalia Jagielska published a short biography of Levshakova in the Palaeontology Newsletter, published by the Palaeontological Association. Jagielska assessed Levshakova as follows:

Rarely can a palaeontologist leave behind such a colourful history, from cannabis to underground rock movements and failed murder attempts. Irina Levshakova is a fascinating figure, not known to all within the world of palaeontology, but too fascinating to ignore or move into the obscurity of time.

== See also ==
- List of Russian Earth scientists
- List of Russian women artists
