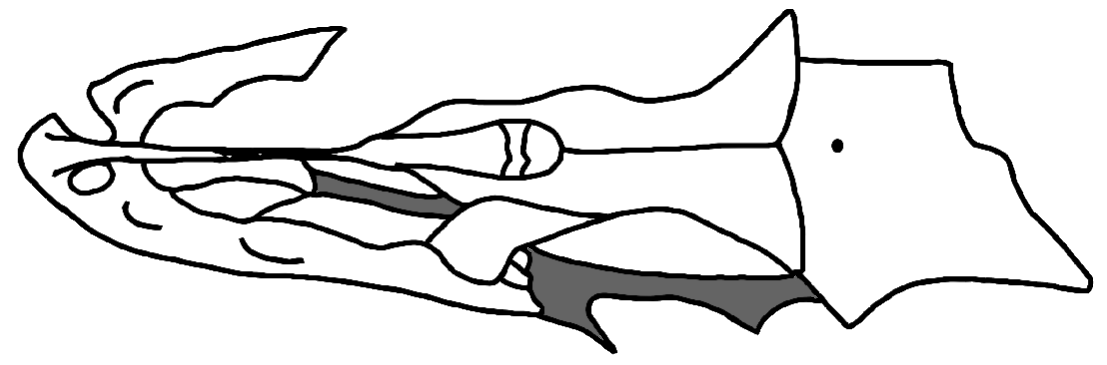
- Drawing of partially reconstructed skull (top view)

Scientific classification
- Kingdom: Animalia
- Phylum: Chordata
- Class: Reptilia
- Order: Squamata
- Suborder: Anguimorpha
- Family: Varanidae
- Genus: Varanus
- Species: V. darevskii

Binomial name
- Varanus darevskii Levshakova, 1986

= Varanus darevskii =

Varanus darevskii Temporal range: Early Pliocene, 5–4 Ma

Extinct species of lizard

Varanus darevskii, also known as the Central Asian monitor, is an extinct species of monitor lizard from the Early Pliocene of Tajikistan, known from a partial skull. V. darevskii might have been a close relative of, and perhaps ancestral to, the modern desert monitor (V. griseus).

== Discovery and naming ==
Varanus darevskii was described by the Russian palaeontologist Irina Levshakova in 1986, based on a partial skull in comparatively good condition from the Early Pliocene found near the village of Sor in the Sughd Region of Tajikistan. The skull preserved the snout in its entirety, alongside portions of the skull roof and palate.

The species name darevskii honors the Russian zoologist and herpetologist Ilya Darevsky. Levshakova also gave the species a common name, calling it the Central Asian monitor.

== Description ==
The skull of V. darevskii is similar to the modern desert monitor (V. griseus), but differs by having a broader parietal region and a more pointed tip of the snout. Though the fossil is incompletely preserved, it is also possible that the orbits of V. darevskii were larger than those of V. griseus. V. darevskii was slightly smaller than V. griseus (which usually grow to about one meter in length), but had bigger teeth.

== Classification ==
Levshakova classified V. darevskii within the Varanus subgenus Psammosaurus (which also contains V. griseus) on the basis of both anatomy and zoogeography. She believed V. darevskii to be closely related, perhaps ancestral, to V. griseus. Levshakova further placed the extinct species V. marathonensis in the same subgenus, arguing that it too was a close relative of V. darevskii. A 2018 analysis found V. marathonensis to fall outside of such a clade with V. griseus, instead being more closely related to eastern Varanus species such as V. flavescens and V. bengalensis.

According to the 2004 reference work Varanoid Lizards of the World by Eric R. Pianka, Dennis King and Ruth Allen King, Levshakova's classification of V. darevskii is sensible and it would not be surprising if V. griseus were a descendant of V. darevskii, although no phylogenetic studies have yet taken V. darevskii into account and confirmed it. A 2016 analysis recovered V. darevskii as belonging to the subgenus Polydaedalus, which includes modern species such as the Nile monitor (V. niloticus), rock monitor (V. albigularis) and savannah monitor (V. exanthematicus). If this classification is correct, V. darevskii would be the first known occurrence of Polydaedalus in western Asia.
