= Varanus nesterovi =

Scientific classification
- Kingdom: Animalia
- Phylum: Chordata
- Class: Reptilia
- Order: Squamata
- Suborder: Anguimorpha
- Family: Varanidae
- Genus: Varanus
- Subgenus: Psammosaurus
- Species: V. nesterovi

Binomial name
- Varanus nesterovi Böhme, Ehrlich, Milto, Orlov, & Scholz, 2015

Species of lizard

Varanus nesterovi, known commonly as Nesterov's desert monitor, is a species of monitor lizard in the subgenus Psammosaurus of the genus Varanus. It can be found in the Zagros Mountains between Iraq and Iran. It was previously considered a subspecies of the desert monitor (V. griseus) before being elevated to full species status in 2015. It was named after its original discoverer, Petr Vladimirovich Nesterov (1883-1941).
