= Irina Linnik =

Russian art historian (1922–2009)

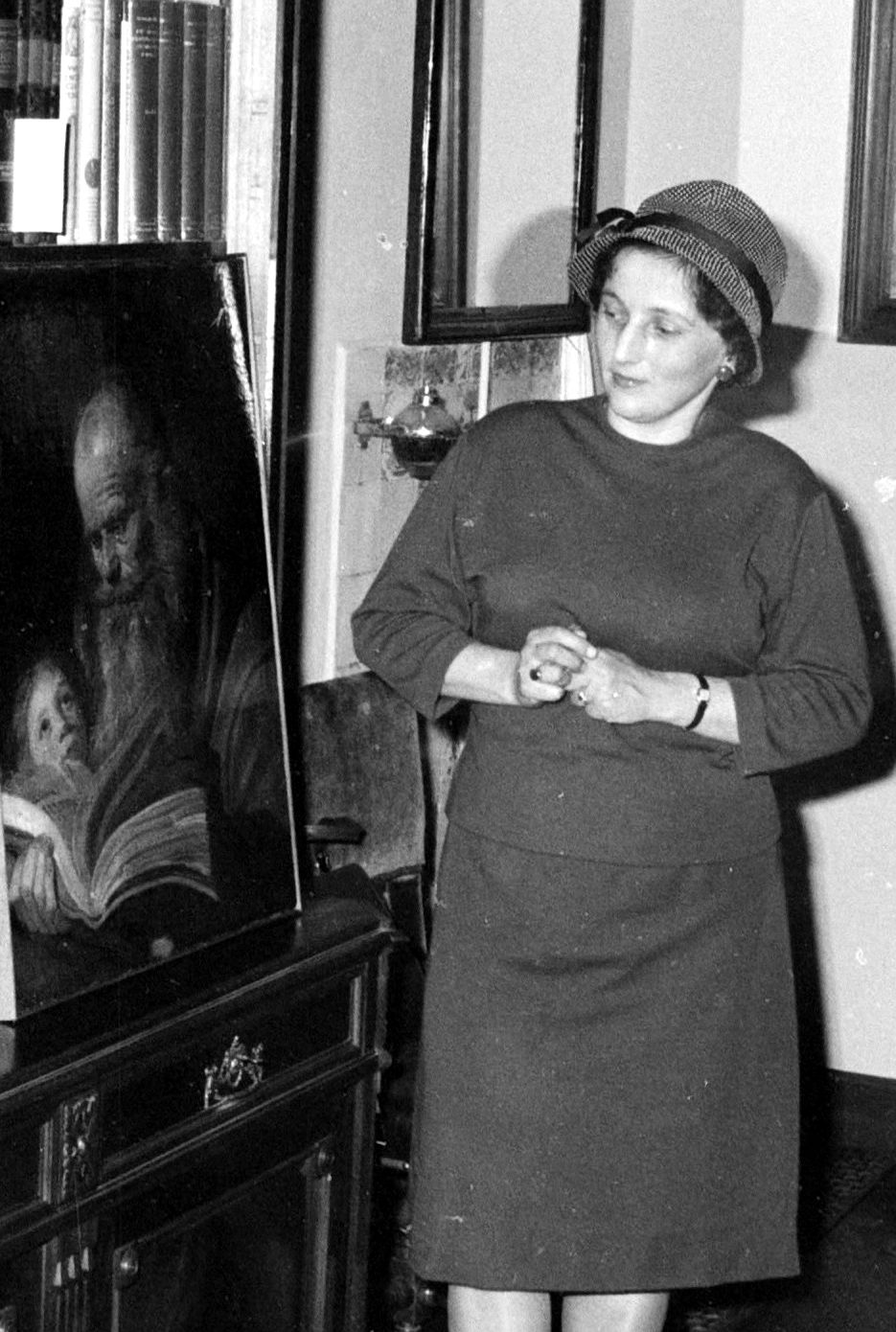
Irina Linnik with painting of Frans Hals in Haarlem, 1962

Irina Vladimirovna Linnik (Russian: Ирина Владимировна Линник; 1922 – 23 March 2009) was a prominent Russian art historian. Considered an icon in Dutch art history and a leading specialist in Western European painting, Linnik's work was mainly concerned with the identification and attribution of 17th-century paintings from the Low Countries, France and Italy. Over the course of her career she identified, attributed and re-attributed around 250 different paintings.

== Early life ==
Irina Vladimirovna Linnik was born in 1922. She was the daughter of Vladimir Pavlovich Linnik (1889–1984), a well-known Soviet physicist, and sister of Yuri Linnik (1915–1972), a well-known mathematician. Linnik studied at the Leningrad University and graduated in 1946 with an education in medieval history.

== Professional career ==
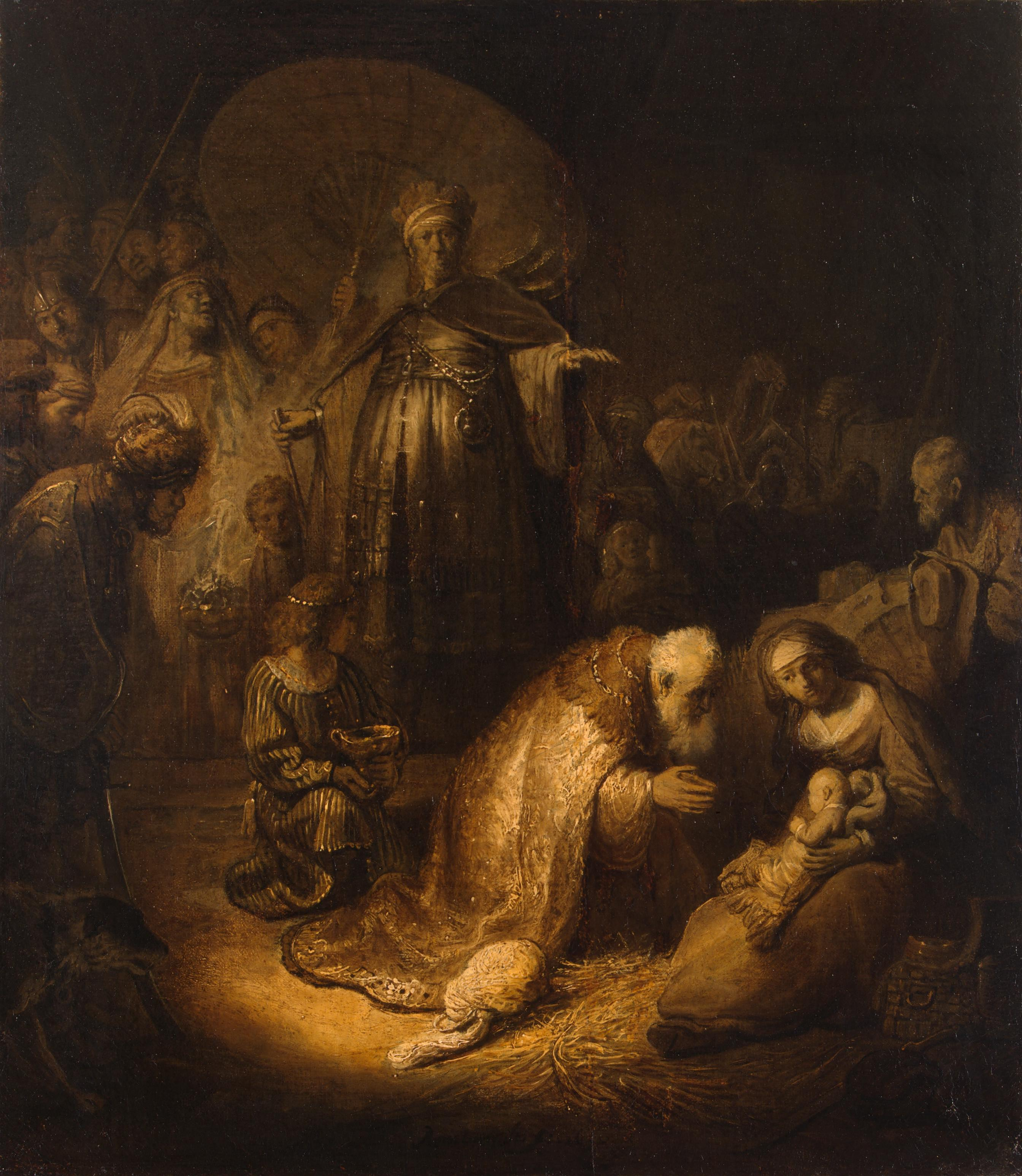
The Adoration of the Magi (17th century) by Rembrandt

After her graduation, Linnik began working at the State Hermitage Museum in Leningrad (later Saint Petersburg), which she remained closely connected to for the rest of her life. She worked for many years as the curator of the museum's department of Western European art. Linnik sometimes travelled abroad for her research; her first time outside the Soviet Union was a trip to the Netherlands in 1958. On this trip, she visited the former home of the artist Rembrandt (1606–1669), whose work she admired.

Linnik was a specialist in Dutch art history. Her main focus was attributing Western European paintings from the 17th century, particularly Dutch and Flemish and also some Italian and French. By her own count, Linnik attributed or re-attributed around 250 paintings. The paintings were painted by artists such as Gerard van Honthorst, Hendrick Goltzius, Frans Hals, Frans Snyders, Govert Flinck and Rembrandt.

Among Linnik's most publicized work was the discovery that what was believed to be a copy of the painting The Adoration of the Magi by Rembrandt in the Hermitage Museum was the original painting. She proved this through detailed comparisons between the painting in Russia and what was previously believed to be the original, housed in the Swedish Museum of Gothenburg. Through stylistic differences and X-rays of the paintings, Linnik was able to determine that the painting in Russia was the original.

In 1958, Linnik also received much attention for discovering that two paintings exhibited in Odessa, previously believed to have been painted by Russian artists, were actually two lost paintings by Frans Hals, depicting the evangelists Luke and Matthew.

Linnik also wrote numerous scientific articles, monographs and exhibition catalogues. Among her most well-known publications in western academia were Dutch Paintings in Soviet Museums, written in collaboration with her husband Yuri Ivanovich Kuznetsov. The publication of the book made the whereabouts of many Dutch paintings known to western art historians for the first time. In Russia, she is most known for the monograph Dutch Seventeenth-century Paintings and the Problems of Attribution, considered a model monograph.

In 1988, Linnik became a member of CODART, an international network of curators of art from the Low Countries.

== Personal life ==
Linnik's husband Yuri Ivanovich Kuznetsov was also a prominent art historian and an expert on Rembrandt. Their children include the paleontologist and artist Irina Levshakova (1959–2016). Linnik died on 23 March 2009 at the age of 86.
