= Komarovo, Arkhangelsk Oblast =

Komarovo Комарово
- Settlement
- Location within Arkhangelsk Oblast Location within Russia
- Coordinates: 61°46′N 46°52′E
- Country: Russia
- Region: Arkhangelsk Oblast
- District: Krasnoborsky District
- Time zone: UTC+3:00

Komarovo (Russian: Комарово) is a rural locality (a settlement) in Kulikovskoye Rural Settlement of Krasnoborsky District, Arkhangelsk Oblast, Russia. The population was 417 as of 2010. There are 11 streets.

== Geography ==
Komarovo is located 74 km northeast of Krasnoborsk (the district's administrative centre) by road. Kulikovo is the nearest rural locality.
