= Komarovo, Altai Krai =

Komarovo Комарово
- Selo
- Location within Altai Krai Location within Russia
- Coordinates: 52°33′N 84°43′E
- Country: Russia
- Region: Altai Krai
- District: Zonalny District
- Time zone: UTC+7:00

Komarovo (Russian: Комарово) is a rural locality (a selo) in Sokolovsky Selsoviet, Zonalny District, Altai Krai, Russia. The population was 427 as of 2013. There are 10 streets.

== Geography ==
Komarovo is located 36 km southwest of Zonalnoye (the district's administrative centre) by road. Sokolovo is the nearest rural locality.
