= Komarovo, Voronezh Oblast =

Komarovo Комарово
- Khutor
- Location within Voronezh Oblast Location within Russia
- Coordinates: 50°18′N 39°45′E
- Country: Russia
- Region: Voronezh Oblast
- District: Rossoshansky District
- Time zone: UTC+3:00

Komarovo (Russian: Комарово) is a rural locality (a khutor) in Popovskoye Rural Settlement, Rossoshansky District, Voronezh Oblast, Russia. The population was 63 as of 2010.
