= Komarovo, Dobryansky District =

Komarovo Комарово
- Village
- Location within Perm Krai Location within Russia
- Coordinates: 58°27′N 56°26′E
- Country: Russia
- Region: Perm Krai
- District: Dobryansky District
- Time zone: UTC+5:00

Komarovo (Russian: Комарово) is a rural locality (a village) in Dobryansky District, Perm Krai, Russia. The population was 1 as of 2010. There are 3 streets.
