= Komarovo, Saint Petersburg =

Municipal settlement in Saint Petersburg, Russia

Komarovo Комарово Kellomäki (Finnish)
- Municipal Settlement
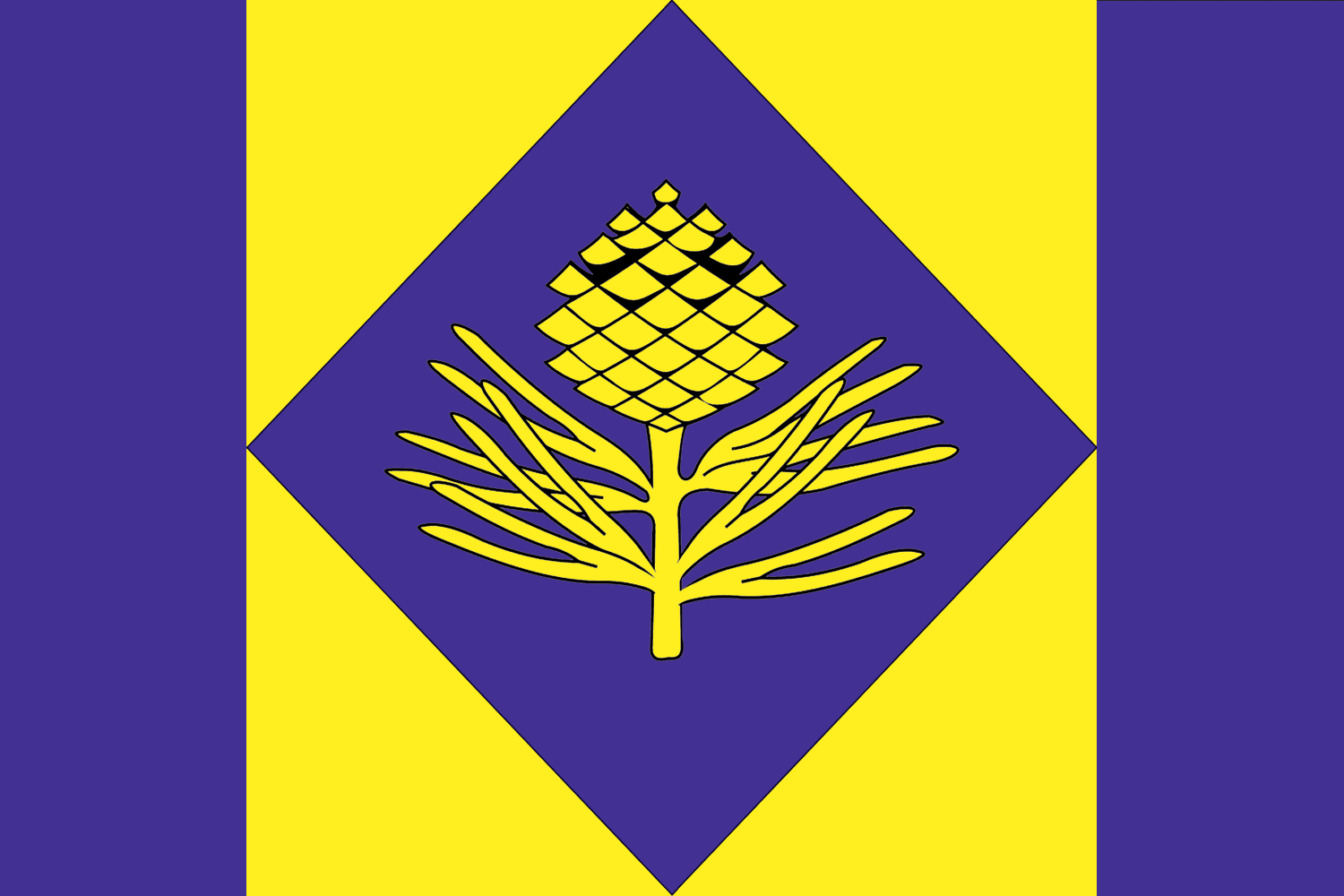
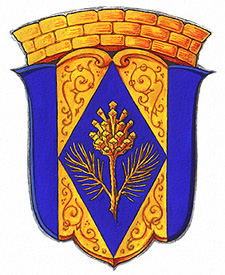
- Flag Coat of arms

- Location of Komarovo in Saint Petersburg
- Interactive map of Komarovo
- Location of Komarovo Komarovo (Saint Petersburg)
- Coordinates: 60°11′15″N 29°48′31″E
- Country: Russia
- Federal subject: Saint Petersburg

Population
  - Estimate (2023): 1,487 )
- Time zone: UTC+
- Postal code: 197733
- Dialing code: +7 +7 812
- OKTMO ID: 40364000

Komarovo (Russian: Комаро́во, IPA: [kəmɐˈrovə]; Finnish: Kellomäki) is a municipal settlement in Kurortny District of the federal city of St. Petersburg, Russia, located in the Karelian Isthmus on the shore of the Gulf of Finland, and a station of the Saint Petersburg-Vyborg railroad. It is about 45 kilometers (28 mi) northwest of central Saint Petersburg. Population: 1,230 (2010 census); 1,062 (2002 census); 1,635 (1989 Soviet census).

Komarovo is renowned for being the residence of numerous Russian intellectuals and prominent figures in science and culture. Among some of its most notable residents were, for example, three Nobel Prize laureates: Ivan Pavlov, Joseph Brodsky, and Zhores Alferov. The list also includes renowned individuals such as jeweller Peter Carl Fabergé, composer Dmitri Shostakovich, poet Anna Akhmatova, dissident Dmitry Likhachev, ballet dancers Mathilde Kschessinska and Galina Ulanova, film actor Innokenty Smoktunovsky, as well as science-fiction authors Arkady and Boris Strugatsky, among many others.

During the summer months, the population increases by a factor of five to six.

== Finnish history ==
Like many settlements on the Karelian Isthmus on the Saint Petersburg-Vyborg railroad line, Kellomäki was vigorously developed in the late 19th – early 20th century at the height of the summer-resort boom. The original meaning of Kellomäki was "Bell Hill", named after a bell positioned on a sandy hill for railroad workers. The bell notified workers of the dinner break and the end of the workday. A railroad station opened near that spot on May 1, 1903, which is the unofficial date of Kellomäki's founding.

The Russian Orthodox Church of the Holy Spirit was built in 1908, and burnt down in 1917. After that, a house chapel in one of the dachas served as the church until the Soviet takeover. In 1916, about 800 dachas were counted in the settlement.

Among the notable residents of Kellomäki, including summer dacha owners, before the Russian Revolution were:

- Leonid Andreyev – writer
- Peter Carl Fabergé – jeweller
- Mathilde Kschessinska – ballerina
- Anna Vyrubova – lady-in-waiting to the Romanov family

The development of summer-resort towns on the Karelian Isthmus was slowed down after Finland's declaration of independence in 1917. Many of the dachas were abandoned, and some 200 buildings were auctioned off, dismantled and rebuilt in other Finnish towns. An Émigré community formed in Kellomäki after the revolution as the White Russians fled to Finland. By the beginning of the Soviet-Finnish War, 167 families remained in the settlement – most of them were evacuated to Järvenpää during the Soviet-Finnish border negotiations in the fall of 1939. On November 30, 1939, after an artillery bombardment, Kellomäki surrendered to Soviet troops without a battle. Several buildings were destroyed, but overall the damage to the settlement was not serious.

Pre-revolutionary villa, Komarovo. Mathilde Kschessinska used to stay here.

== Soviet and Russian history ==
The town was annexed to the Soviet Union in the Moscow Peace Treaty (1940). Immediately after World War II, the Council of Peoples Commissars issued decree No. 2638 "on building dachas for members of the Academy of Sciences of the USSR and setting aside land plots from 1.25 to 2.5 acres (10,000 m^{2}) as gratis personal property". Standard houses manufactured in Finland on account of war reparations, were transported and assembled on the spot. Kellomäki was renamed to Komarovo in honor of botanist Vladimir Komarov, President of the academy in 1948. Special resorts and dachas were also established for Writers, Composers, Theater and Cinema Workers. The land was set aside for Atomic Scientists as well.

Komarovo was built on this principle : people serve the state, and the state pays back with rewards. And the principle was subverted by an aging lady: Anna Akhmatova. It turned out that there are more attractive values than those offered by the state. – Lev Lurye, historian.

Lake Shchuchye in Komarovo

Easily reachable from the city by elektrichka train, the settlement became home to many prominent figures in science and culture, members of the Saint Petersburg (then named Leningrad) intelligentsia.

Komarovo <...> was a place of both family relaxation and work. The settlement had developed its own daily routine. Usually, from the morning until six in the evening, people were busy with <scientific or cultural> work, and closer to seven, under the rays of the warm evening sun, the unhurried stroll along the Kurortnaya street and the nearby paths took place. On this street, they walked, discussed various topics with colleagues, talked about books, theater, and life, brought guests...

Since the 1990s, the academic and cultural traditions of Komarovo have been weakened, and currently, the New Russians and the well-to-dos of Saint Petersburg construct new villas here or redesign existing dachas purchased from the older residents.

In 2005 a nonprofit fund "Kellomaki-Komarovo" was founded. Some of the projects include building a new church, opening a museum, and preserving the yet unprotected forests.

Komarovo has served as a residence for government officials of Saint Petersburg, and still does today. Mayor Valentina Matviyenko lives here in the summer and commutes to the city.

== Famous residents after 1940 by area of prominence ==
=== Literature ===
- Fyodor Abramov – writer
- Anna Akhmatova – poet
- Joseph Brodsky – poet
- Daniil Granin – writer
- Lydia Chukovskaya – writer
- Lydia Ginzburg – literary critic
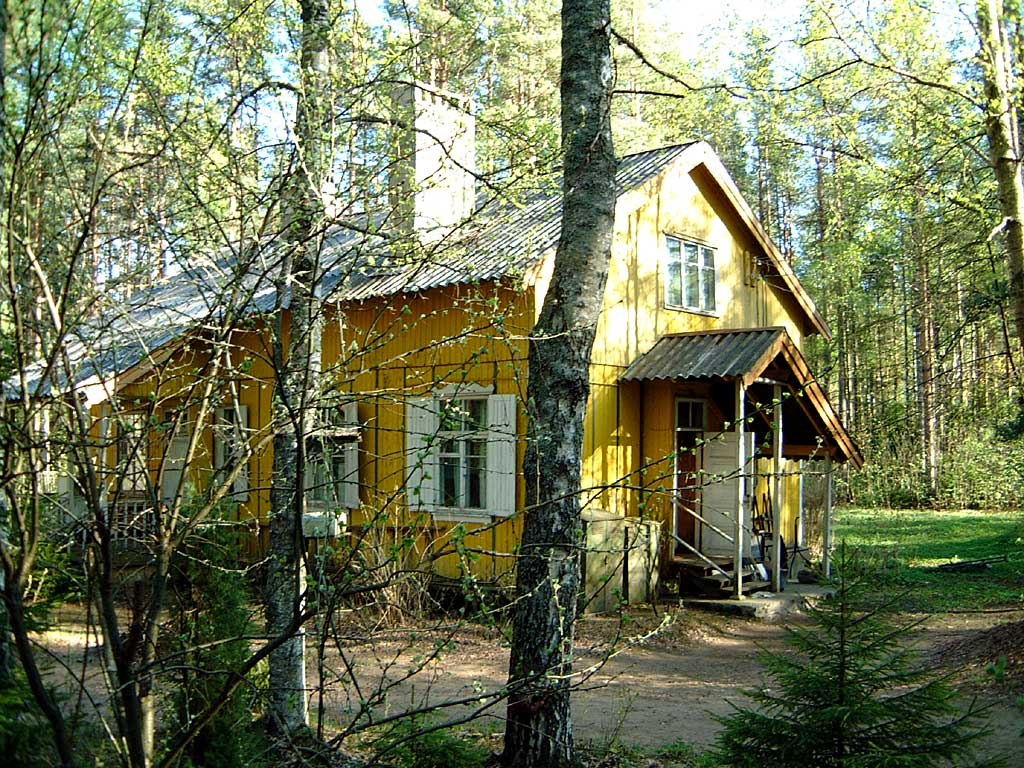
  Komarovo, one of standard houses manufactured in Finland
- Dmitry Likhachev – linguist
- Vera Panova – writer
- Evgeny Shvarts – playwright
- Mikhail Slonimsky – writer
- Arkady and Boris Strugatsky – science fiction writers
- Ivan Yefremov – sci-fi writer and paleontologist

=== Visual arts ===
- Nathan Altman – painter
- Boris Piotrovsky – director of the Hermitage Museum

Complex of Soviet-era dachas located at Ulitsa Akademikov, 15, Komarovo

=== Classical and popular music ===
- Boris Grebenshchikov – rock musician
- Oleg Karavaychuk – composer
- Sergey Kuryokhin – rock musician
- Dmitri Shostakovich – classical composer
- Vasily Solovyov-Sedoi – songwriter
- Viktor Reznikov – musician

=== Science and exploration ===
- Zhores Alferov – physicist, Nobel laureate
- Vladimir Fock – mathematician
- Abram Ioffe – physicist
- Irina Levshakova – palaeontologist, geologist and artist
- Yuri Linnik – mathematician
- Vladimir Komarov – botanist
- Mikhail Somov – oceanologist
- Vladimir Smirnov – mathematician
- Aleksei Treshnikov – polar explorer
- Ivan Yefremov – paleontologist and sci-fi writer

=== Theater and cinema ===
- Aleksey Batalov – actor
- Mikhail Boyarsky – actor
- Nikolay Cherkasov – actor
- Alisa Freindlich – actress
- Grigori Kozintsev – film director
- Andrey Krasko – actor
- Innokenty Smoktunovsky – actor
- Georgy Tovstonogov – theater director
- Galina Ulanova – ballerina

== Scenic features ==
Scots Pine forest in Komarovo

Komarovo is renowned for its sandy beaches and dunes, scots pine, and spruce forests, and glacial lakes. Its residents and visitors enjoy cross-country skiing in the winter, and hiking, bicycling, fishing, wild mushroom, blueberry and raspberry picking in the summer. Its coastal stretch has been designated a protected zone: "Komarovo Shore Natural Reserve".

Remnants of the Winter War, such as trenches and dug-outs, can be seen in the surrounding forests.

== Komarovo in popular culture ==
Komarovo became well known throughout the entire former USSR in the 1980s because of the popular song by Igor Sklyar, "Komarovo": "На недельку, до второго, Я уеду в Комарово" ("For a week until the second [of the month], I will leave for Komarovo")

== Sources ==
Kellomäki – Komarovo. Komarovo Municipal Council, Balashov et al. / Saint Petersburg: Izdatestvo "MKS", 2003. – 48pp. ISBN 5-901810-03-1

Komarovo Shore – Complex Natural Reserve. edited by Volkova, Isachenko, Khramtsov. / Saint Petersburg, 2002. – 92pp. ISBN 5-93938-030-1
