= Komarovo, Sokolsky District, Vologda Oblast =

Komarovo Комарово
- Village
- Location within Vologda Oblast Location within Russia
- Coordinates: 59°27′N 40°26′E
- Country: Russia
- Region: Vologda Oblast
- District: Sokolsky District
- Time zone: UTC+3:00

Komarovo (Russian: Комарово) is a rural locality (a village) in Pelshemskoye Rural Settlement, Sokolsky District, Vologda Oblast, Russia. The population was 2 as of 2002.

== Geography ==
Komarovo is located 32 km east of Sokol (the district's administrative centre) by road. Nadeyevo is the nearest rural locality.
