= Komarovo, Sheksninsky District, Vologda Oblast =

Komarovo Комарово
- Village
- Location within Vologda Oblast Location within Russia
- Coordinates: 59°07′N 38°46′E
- Country: Russia
- Region: Vologda Oblast
- District: Sheksninsky District
- Time zone: UTC+3:00

Komarovo (Russian: Комарово) is a rural locality (a village) in Lyubomirovskoye Rural Settlement, Sheksninsky District, Vologda Oblast, Russia. The population was 1 as of 2002.

== Geography ==
Komarovo is located 23 km southeast of Sheksna (the district's administrative centre) by road. Pogorelka is the nearest rural locality.
