= Komarovo, Permsky District =

Komarovo Комарово
- Village
- Location within Perm Krai Location within Russia
- Coordinates: 57°51′N 56°43′E
- Country: Russia
- Region: Perm Krai
- District: Permsky District
- Time zone: UTC+5:00

Komarovo (Russian: Комарово) is a rural locality (a village) in Dvurechenskoye Rural Settlement, Permsky District, Perm Krai, Russia. The population was 115 as of 2010. There are 16 streets.

== Geography ==
It is located 41 km south-east from Ferma.
