= Komarovo, Puchezhsky District, Ivanovo Oblast =

Komarovo Комарово
- Village
- Location within Ivanovo Oblast Location within Russia
- Coordinates: 57°02′N 42°58′E
- Country: Russia
- Region: Ivanovo Oblast
- District: Puchezhsky District
- Time zone: UTC+3:00

Komarovo (Russian: Комарово) is a rural locality (a village) in Puchezhsky District, Ivanovo Oblast, Russia. Population: 5 (2010 census);

== Geography ==
This rural locality is located 14 kilometres (8.7 mi) from Puchezh (the district's administrative centre), 121 kilometres (75 mi) from Ivanovo (capital of Ivanovo Oblast) and 354 kilometres (220 mi) from Moscow. Pyatnitsa-Vysokovo is the nearest rural locality.
