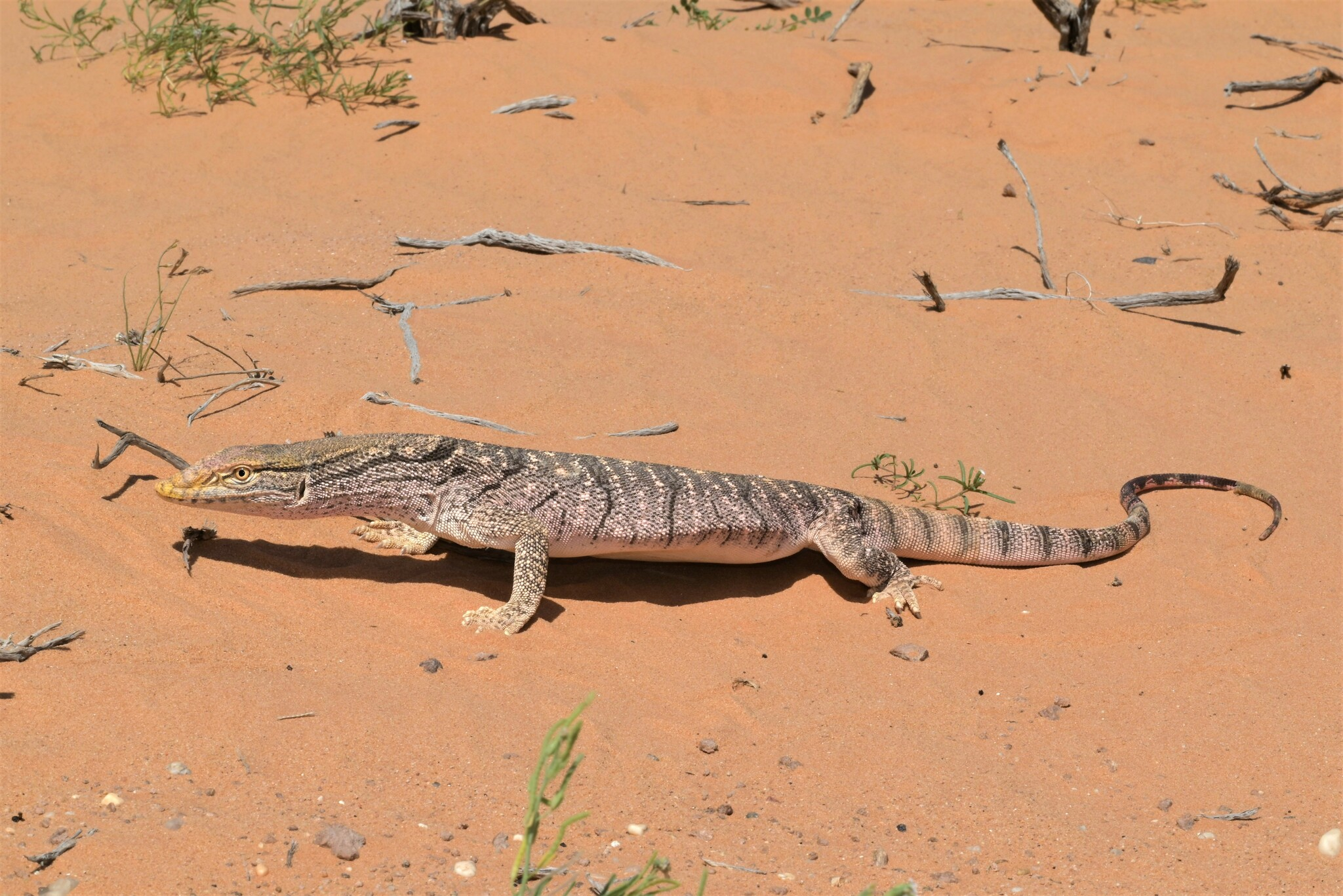
- Desert monitor in Saudi Arabia

Scientific classification
- Kingdom: Animalia
- Phylum: Chordata
- Class: Reptilia
- Order: Squamata
- Suborder: Anguimorpha
- Family: Varanidae
- Genus: Varanus
- Subgenus: Psammosaurus

Species
- Varanus griseus; Varanus nesterovi

= Varanus (Psammosaurus) =

Subgenus of reptiles

Psammosaurus is one of the 11 subgenera of the genus Varanus. It consists of two species of desert monitor native to Asia and North Africa.

== Taxonomy ==
Species	Taxon author	Common name	Image
V. griseus	Daudin, 1803	Desert monitor	
V. nesterovi	Böhme, Ehrlich, Milto, Orlov, & Scholz, 2015	Nesterov's desert monitor	
