= Komarovo, Chernushinsky District, Perm Krai =

Komarovo Комарово
- Village
- Location within Perm Krai Location within Russia
- Coordinates: 56°36′N 55°50′E
- Country: Russia
- Region: Perm Krai
- District: Chernushinsky District
- Time zone: UTC+5:00

Komarovo (Russian: Комарово) is a rural locality (a village) in Chernushinsky District, Perm Krai, Russia. The population was 37 as of 2010. There is 1 street.

== Geography ==
Komarovo is located 22 km northwest of Chernushka (the district's administrative centre) by road. Bedryazh is the nearest rural locality.
