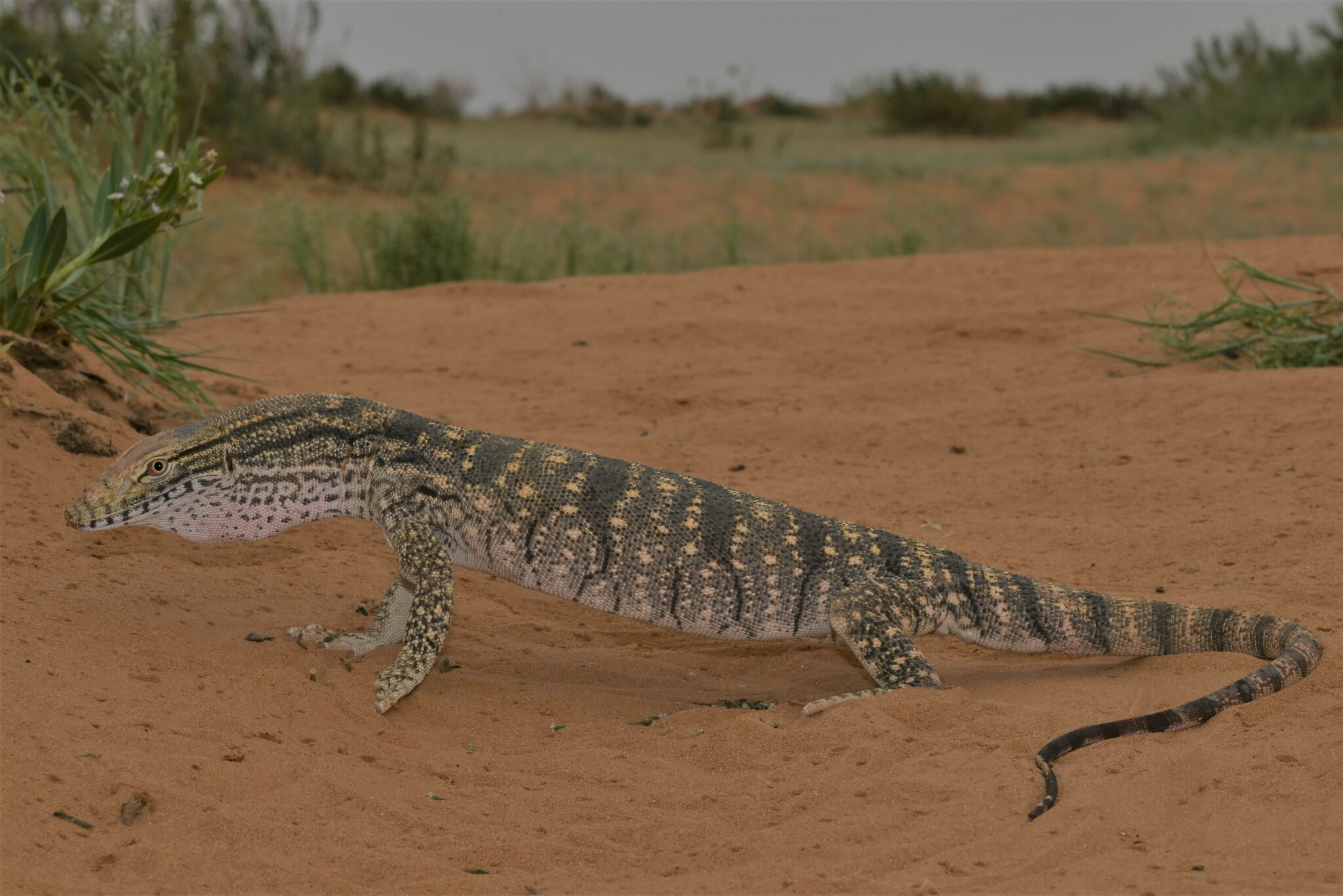
- Grey monitor (V. g. griseus)
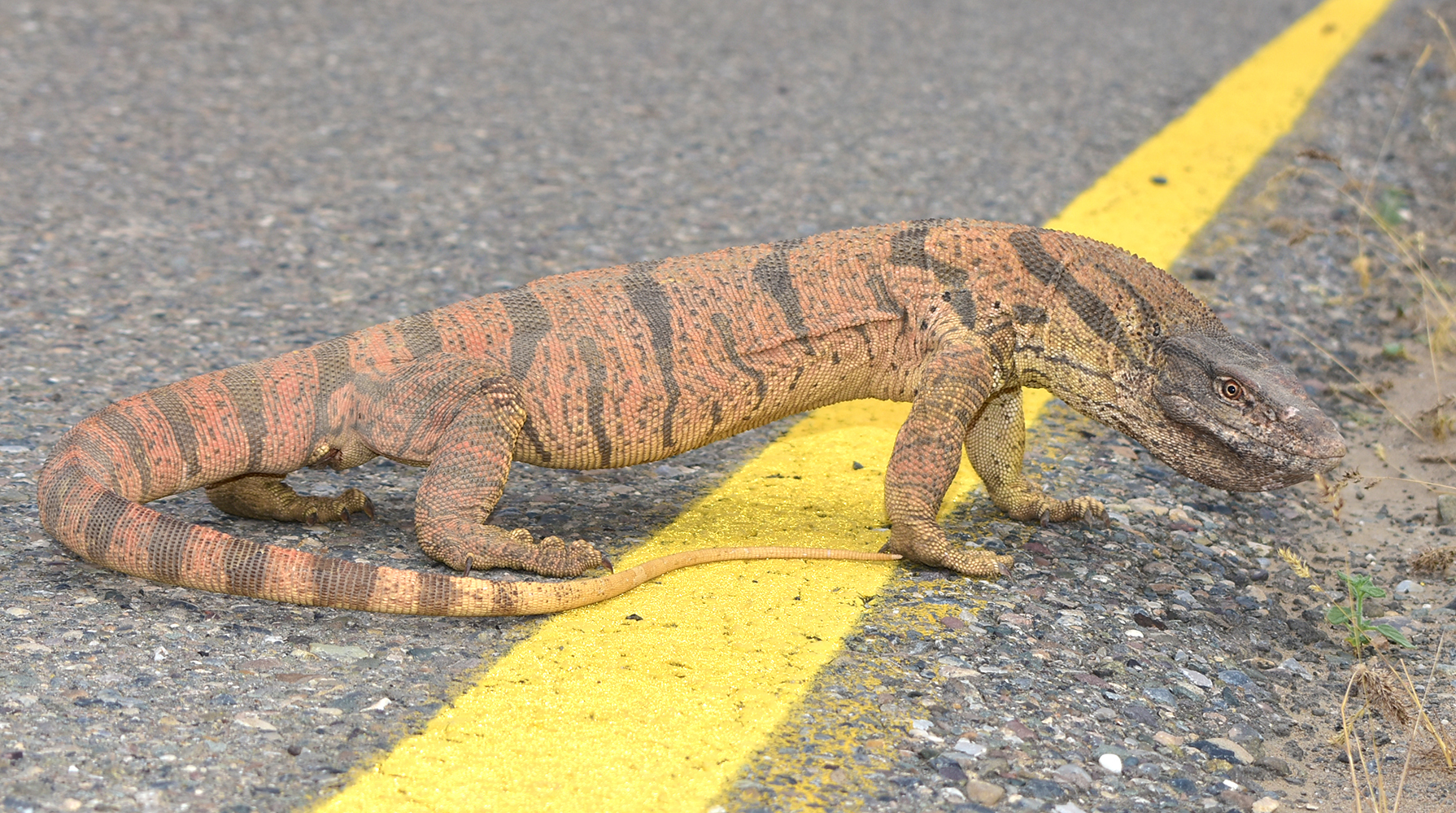
- Caspian monitor (V. g. caspius)

Conservation status
- Least Concern (IUCN 3.1)
- CITES Appendix I

Scientific classification
- Kingdom: Animalia
- Phylum: Chordata
- Class: Reptilia
- Order: Squamata
- Suborder: Anguimorpha
- Family: Varanidae
- Genus: Varanus
- Subgenus: Psammosaurus
- Species: V. griseus

Binomial name
- Varanus griseus (Daudin, 1803)
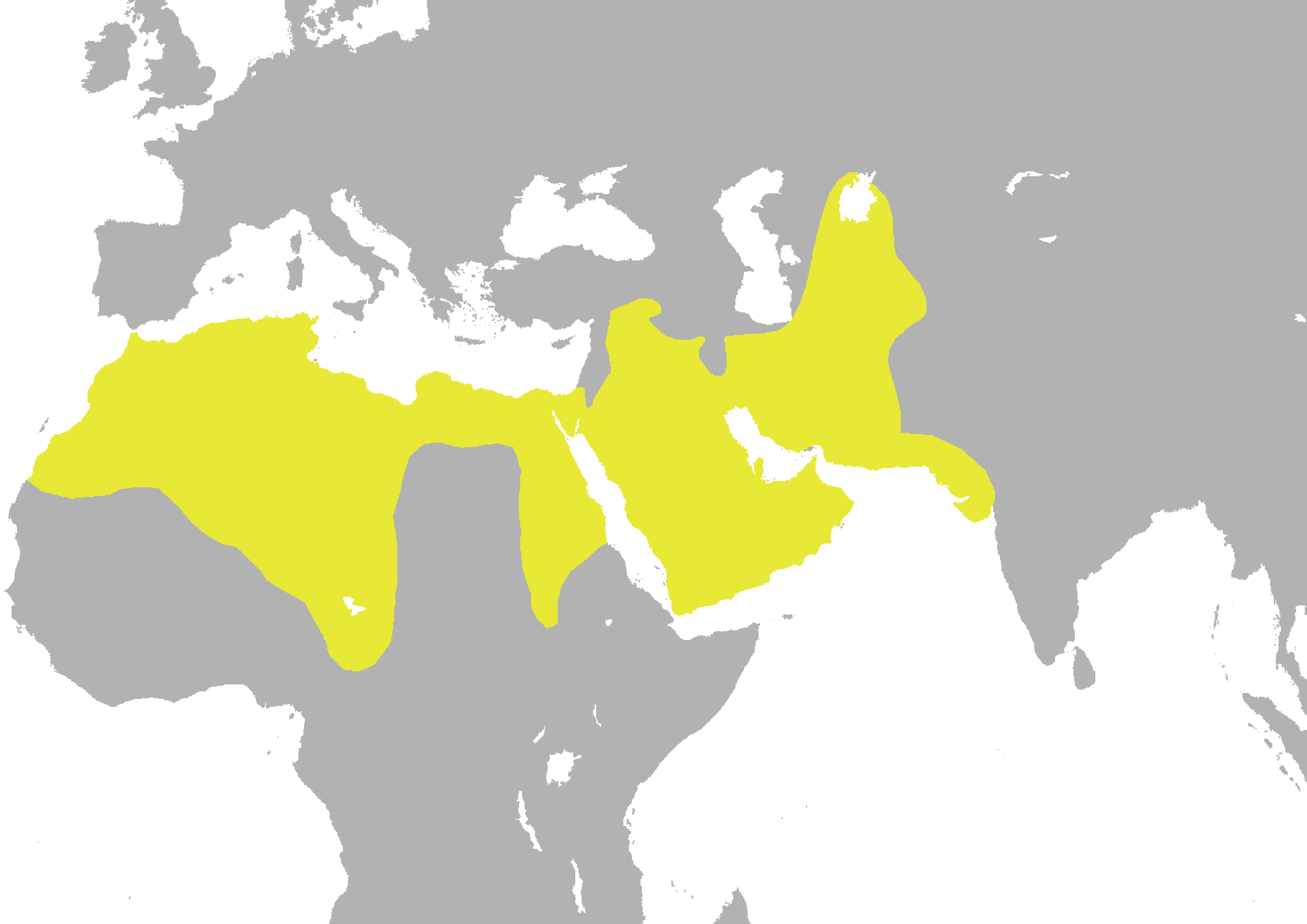

Synonyms
- List: Psammosaurus arabicus Hemprich & Ehrenberg, 1899; Psammosaurus griseus Sixta, 1900; Psammosaurus terrestris Rablrückhard, 1881; Tupinambis arenarius Geoffroy, 1827; Tupinambis griseus Daudin, 1803; Varanus arenarius Duméril & Bibron, 1836; Varanus griseus griseus De Lisle, 1996; Varanus scincus Merrem, 1820; Varanus terrestris Schinz, 1834; Varanus (Psammosaurus) griseus Mertens, 1942

= Desert monitor =

Species of lizard

The desert monitor (Varanus griseus) is a species of monitor lizard of the order Squamata found living throughout North Africa and Central and South Asia. The desert monitor is carnivorous, feeding on a wide range of vertebrates and invertebrates.

== Description ==
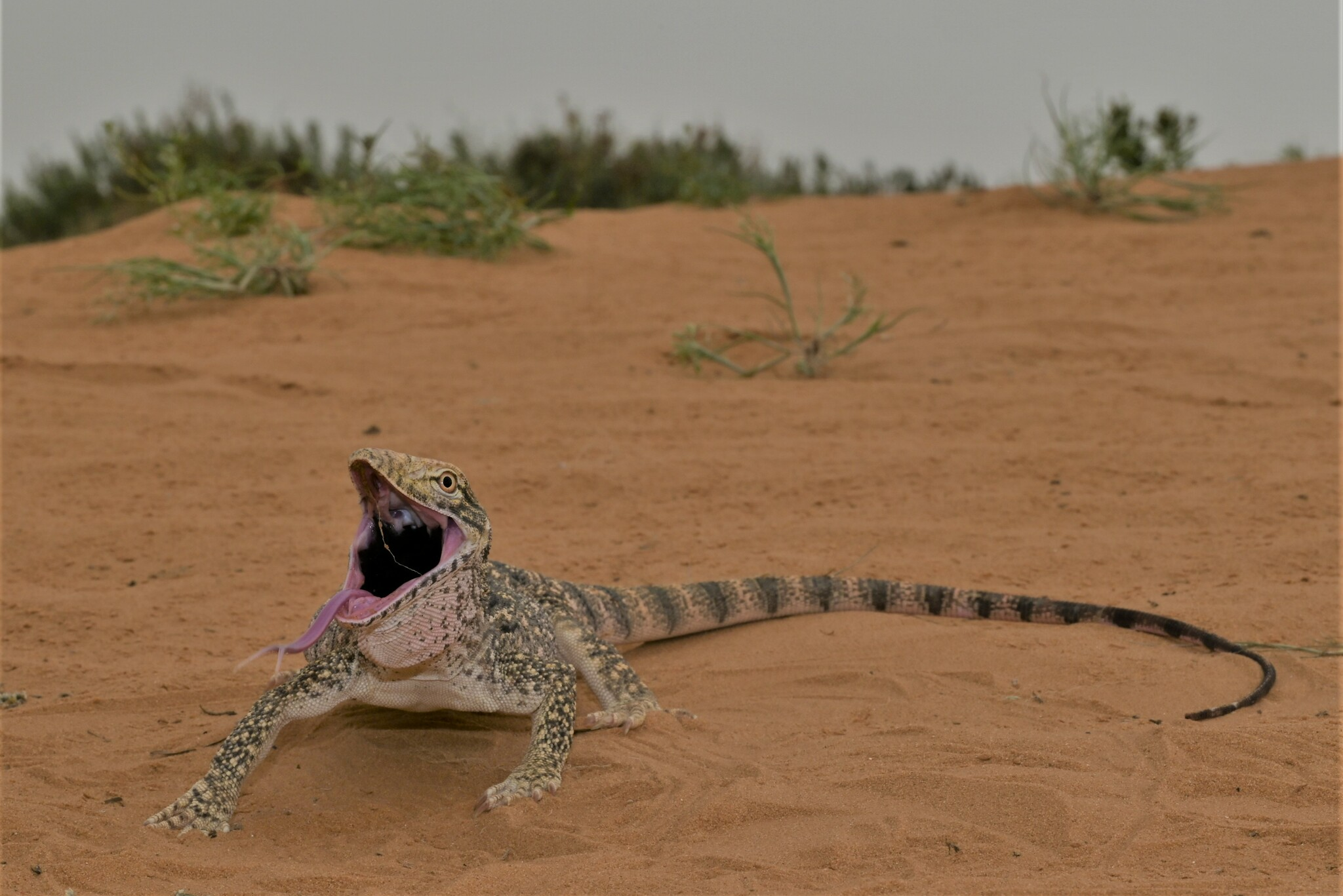
V. g. griseus threat display

Desert monitors normally display a variety of body coloration from light brown and yellow to grey. They average about 1 meter in length, but can reach total body lengths of almost 2 meters. These lizards can also have horizontal bands on either their backs or tails, along with yellow spots across their backs. Their young are normally a brightly coloured orange and have distinctive bands across their backs which may be lost as they mature. Their nostrils are slits located farther back on their snouts (closer to the eyes than the nose), and their overall body size is dependent on the available food supply, the time of year, environmental climate, and reproductive state. Males are generally larger and more robust than females. Those differences allow males to be distinguished from females. Like all lizards, they go through periods of molting in which they shed their outer layer of skin to expand their overall body size. For adults, this process can take several months and happens around three times per year. Their skin is adapted to the desert environment where they live, and they are excellent swimmers and divers and have been known to enter the water occasionally to hunt for food.

== Distribution ==
The desert monitor has a wide distribution across many countries and regions. It can be found in Jordan, Turkey, Morocco, Algeria, Tunisia, Libya, Egypt, Israel, Syria, Lebanon, Iraq, Oman, Turkmenistan, Kazakhstan, Uzbekistan, Tajikistan, Kyrgyzstan, Western Sahara, Mauritania, Palestine, Mali, Niger, Chad, Sudan, Afghanistan, Iran (including the Kavir desert), Pakistan, and northwest India. Its type locality is Dardsha, located on the coast of the Caspian Sea.

== Subspecies ==
Three subspecies have been described:

- V. g. griseus (grey monitor)
- V. g. caspius (Caspian monitor)
- V. g. koniecznyi (Indian desert monitor)

Nota bene: Böhme et al. 2023 argues that all three subspecies should be elevated to full species status due to their parapatric distribution and genetic distance.

=== Varanus griseus griseus ===
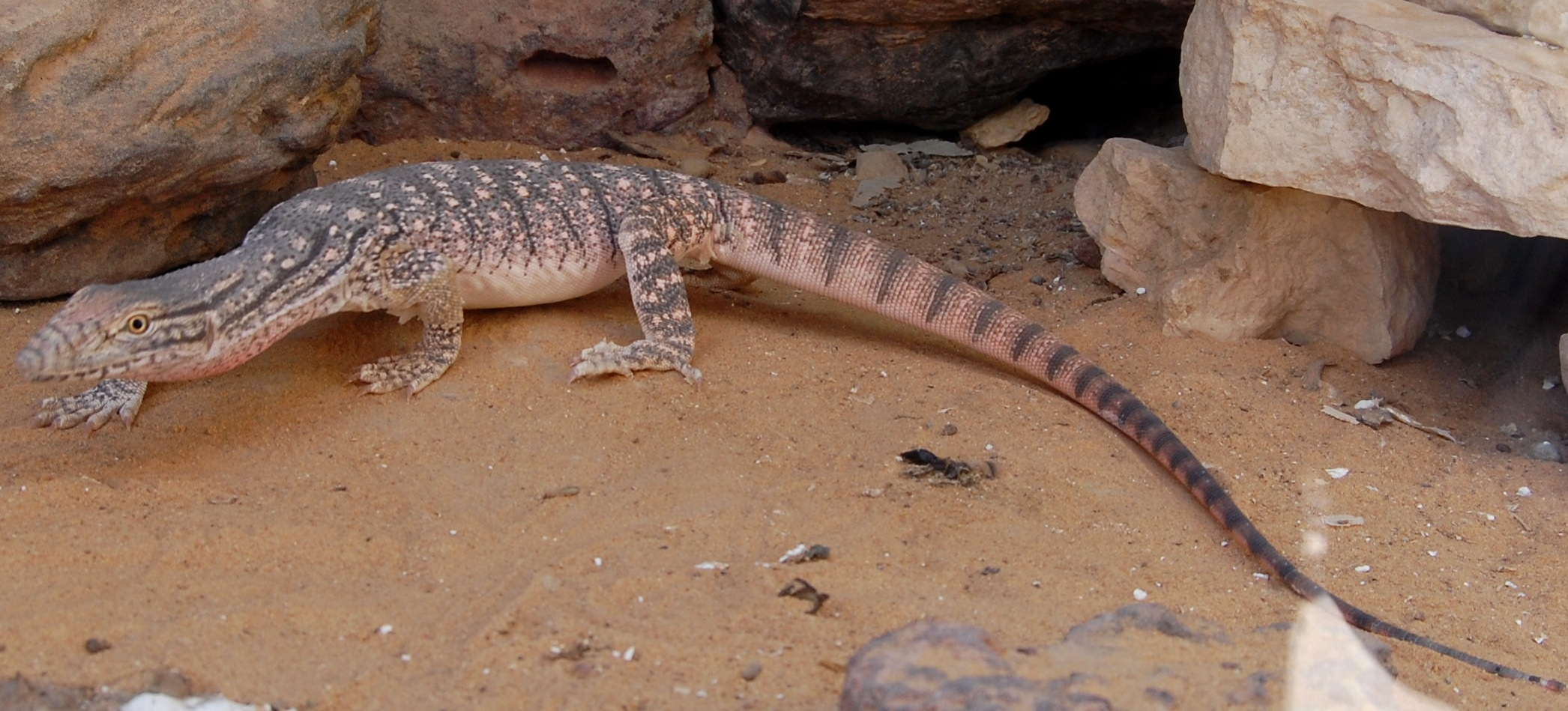
Grey monitor (V. g. griseus), the nominate subspecies

V. g. griseus (grey monitor) has five to eight narrow grey bands on its back, as well as 19-28 bands on its tail. Its tail is more rounded that those of the other subspecies, and the final size of the adult depends on which habitat they are living. Their coloration can be from simple grey (in desert-like ecosystems) to bright orange (in areas with large amounts of plant growth). Their most common prey is lizards and snakes, but can also include ground-nesting birds and small mammals.

It can be found in north Africa (from Morocco and Mauritania east to Egypt and Sudan), the Arabian Peninsula (although appearing to be absent from Bahrain), southeastern Turkey, Syria, Israel, Palestine, Lebanon, Jordan and Iraq.

=== Varanus griseus caspius ===
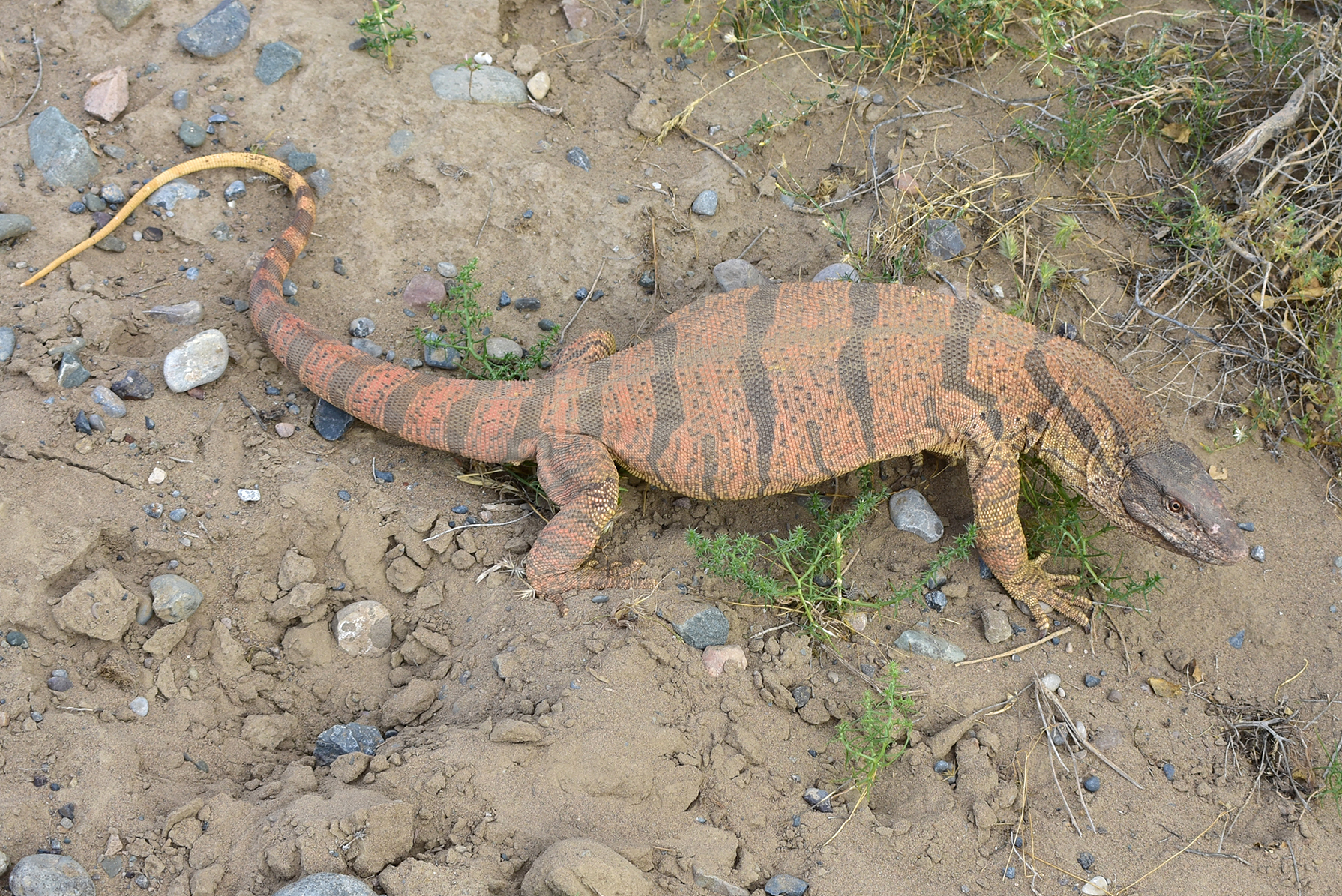
Caspian monitor (V. g. caspius)

V. g. caspius (Caspian monitor) has five to eight bands on its back, 13-19 bands on its tail, a plain tail tip, and about 143 rows of scales in the middle section of its body. The Caspian monitor is found from the eastern shore of the Caspian Sea and east to the Central Asian plateaus, as well as islets of the Aral Sea. They can be found at elevations up to 800 meters in the Kopet Dag Mountains, northern Iran, western and southern Afghanistan and as far as south as western Pakistan. It is best-known from the secretions of Turkmenistan, Kazakhstan, Uzbekistan, Kyrgyzstan and Tajikistan.

They are found in barren areas of mainly sand and/or clay soils, and occasionally in wooded areas. Their diets include numerous invertebrates, small lizards and birds, bird eggs, young turtles and tortoises (and their eggs), rodents, and even cobras and vipers. They are strong diggers and can easily build burrows that are several feet long.

=== Varanus griseus koniecznyi ===
V. g. koniecznyi (Indian desert monitor) has three to five bands on its back, 13-19 bands on its tail, a plain tail tip, 108-139 rows of scales on its midsection, and a broader and flatter head when compared to the other subspecies. This subspecies has the smallest body of the three. It is mainly found in Pakistan and west-central India, including the states of Gujarat, Rajasthan, Madhya Pradesh and Maharashtra, and probably others.

Due to climatic variations, the Indian subspecies has, reportedly, not been observed engaging in hibernation over the winter, but rather decreasing physical activity, becoming lethargic and inactive. They tend to not feed between December and March. When they resume their normal diets, prey will consist mainly of larger invertebrates and insects, but will also include smaller lizards, rodents, birds, and their chicks and eggs, and various other small vertebrates.

== Biology ==
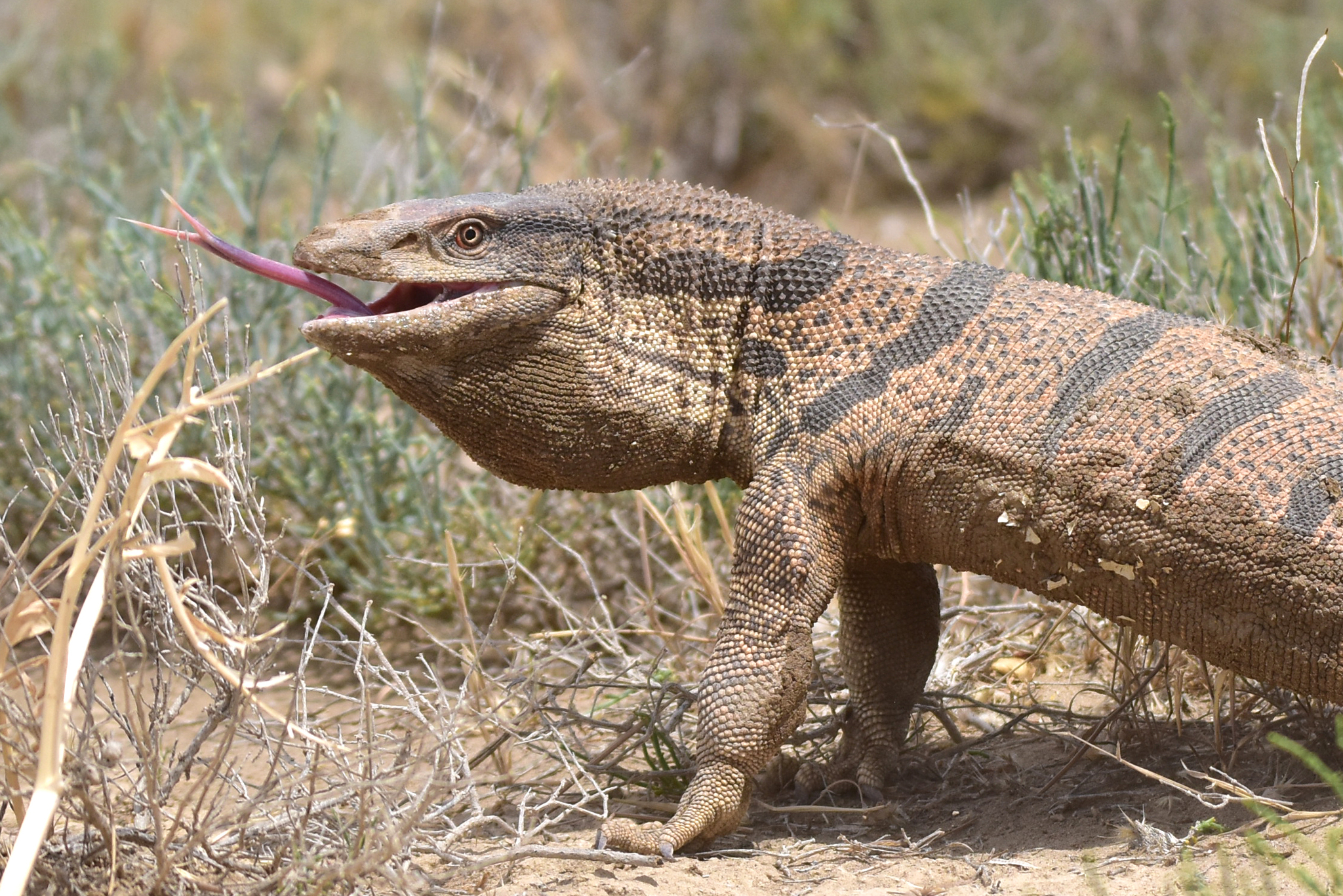
V. g. caspius, showing its forked tongue

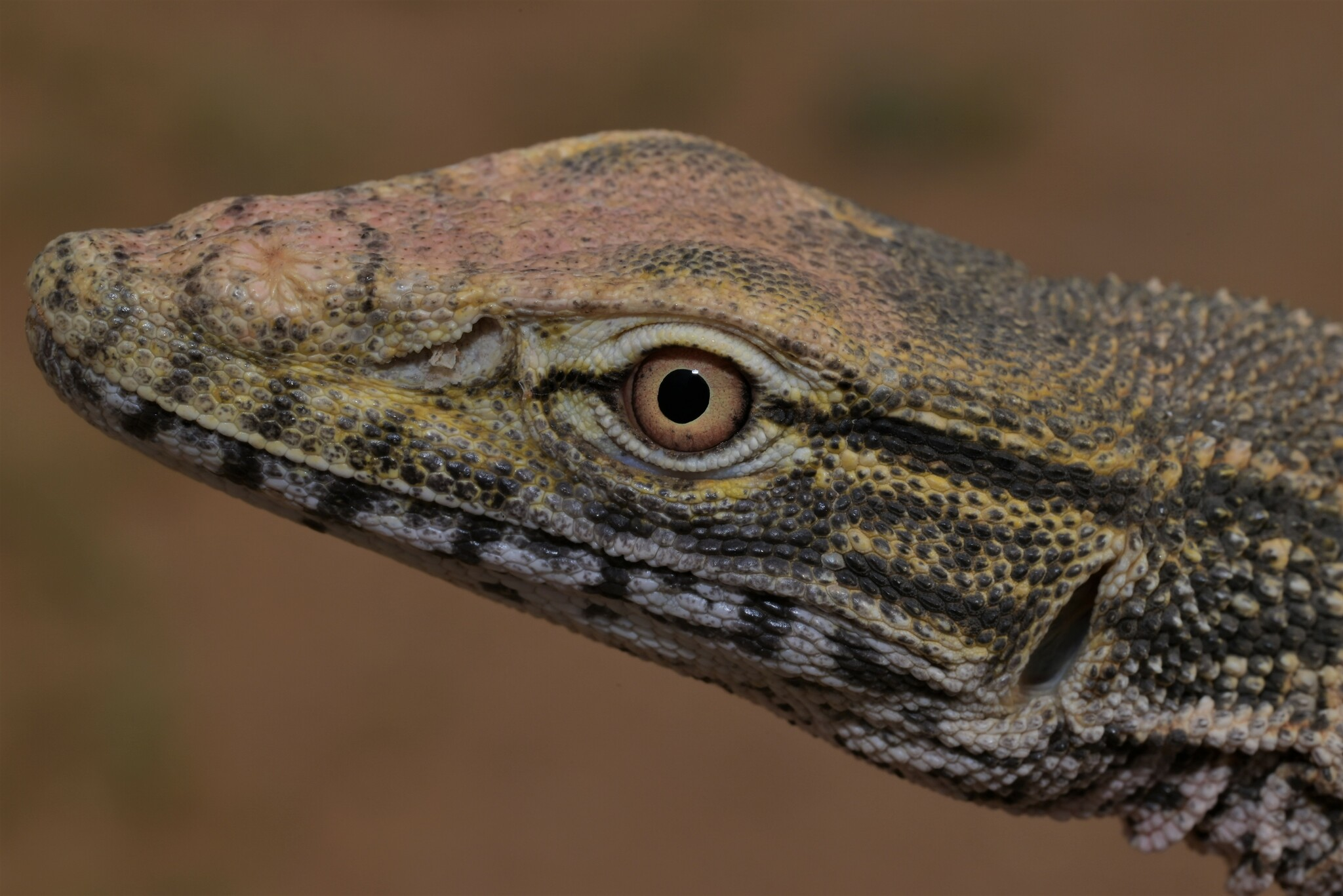
V. g. griseus in Saudi Arabia

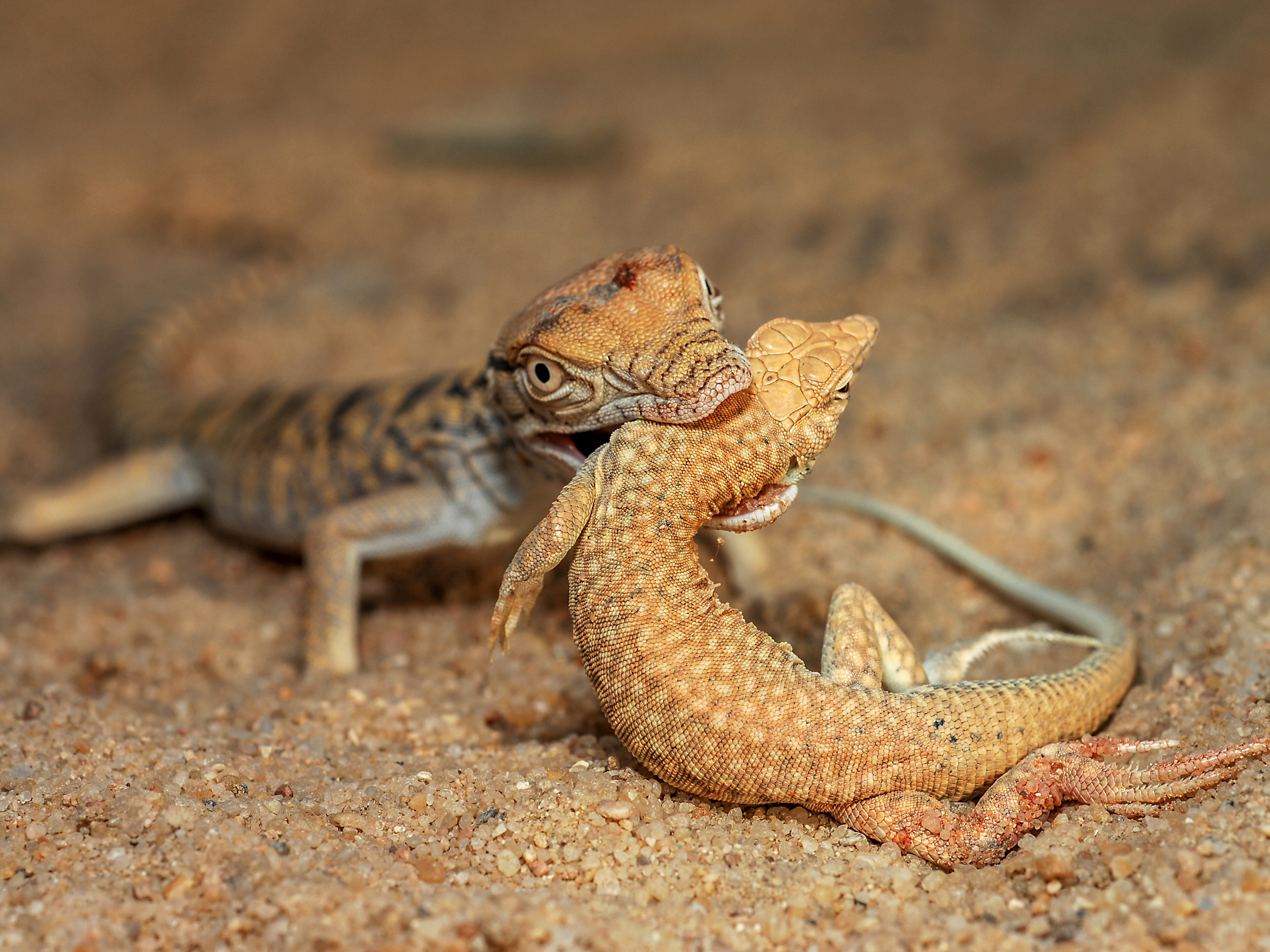
V. g. griseus in Kuwait

Desert monitors goes into hibernation from about September to April. In April is a mass exodus from their hibernation, and they become most active between May and July. During the middle of the day, the lizards mainly stay in their burrows and only come to the desert surface to search for food. The monitor lizards require approximately 3 to 4 full hibernation periods (years) to reach their full size (about 55–65 cm excluding their tails) and at least 3 hibernation periods before they become sexually mature. The overall lifespan of desert monitors in the wild does not normally exceed around 8 years in both males and females.

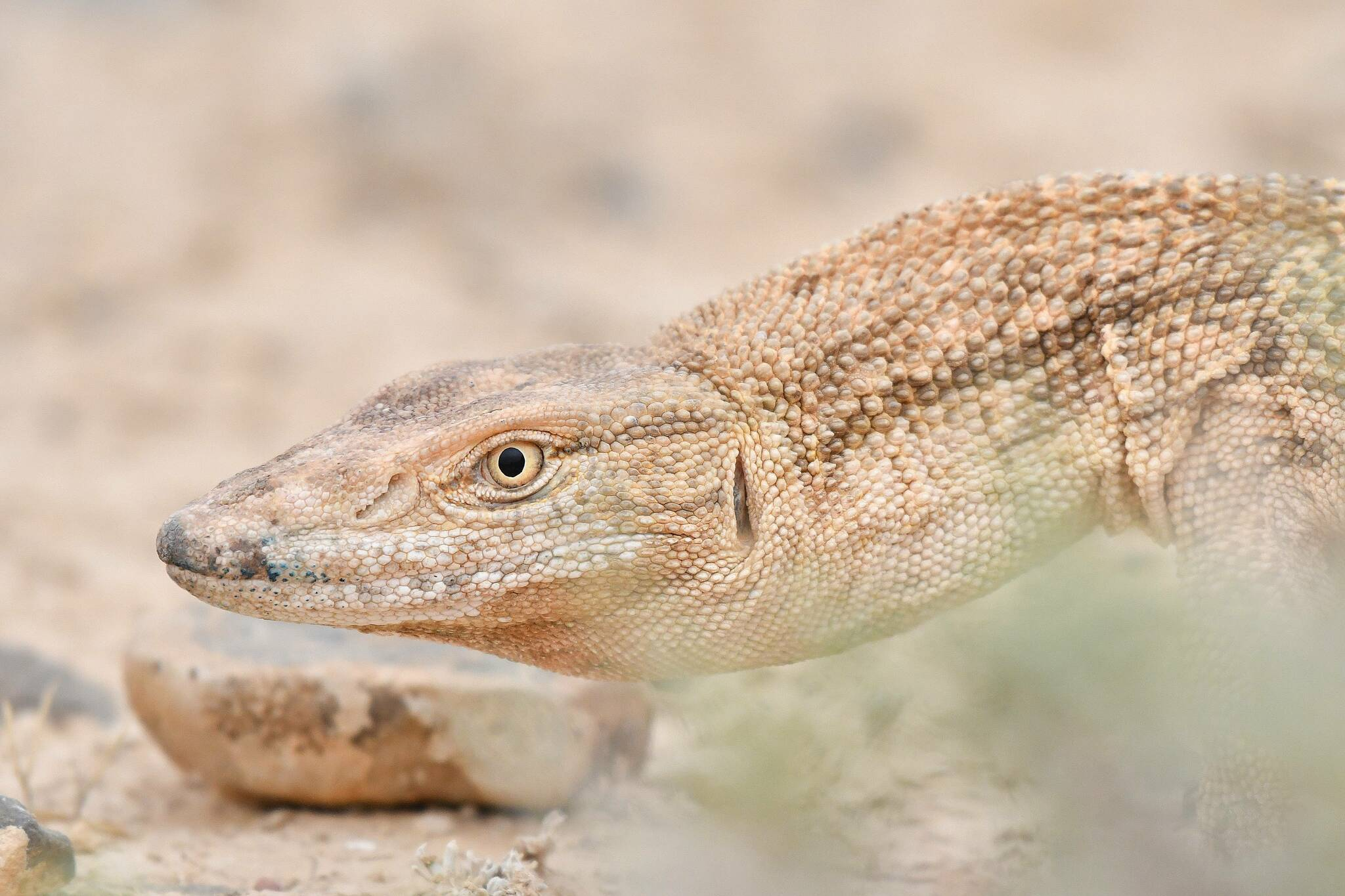
V. g. griseus in Algeria

=== Metabolism ===
Desert monitors are cold-blooded ectotherms whose behaviours therefore depend on the outside temperatures. Many lizards become sluggish in cold weather and even may become inactive if the temperature decreases substantially. Their olfactory and nerve signals significantly slow down, which severely limit the lizard from either catching potential prey or escaping from predators. The body temperature of desert monitors is directly proportional to its running speed between the temperatures of 21 and 37 °C. Between those temperatures, the running speed of the monitor lizard increases from a little over 1 m/s at 21 °C to around 3 m/s at 37 °C. Over 37 °C, its running speed does not increase, and below 21 °C, the lizards are extremely sluggish. If they are being pursued by a predator while their body temperature is less than 21 °C, they will not flee, but will instead hold their ground and become extremely aggressive.

The body temperature of desert monitors depend mainly on the outside environment (time of day, season, etc.). Their internal temperatures begin warming up before they even leave their burrows through conductive heat gain, and their temperatures rapidly rise once they begin basking in the morning sun and reach their highest point in the noonday heat. The specific body temperature of desert monitors can vary depending on the average temperatures of the country they live in, but their maximum body temperature does not usually exceed 38.5 °C even when basking in the sunlight. Males are generally more active and have a higher average body temperature than the females. The body temperature of the lizard during hibernation is 15.0 to 30.5 °C, but in many areas, the average body temperature during hibernation is around 16-18 °C.

The species is one of the few monitor lizards that tolerate relatively cold temperatures, being present as far north as south-west Kazakhstan.

=== Reproduction ===
Desert monitors lay 10-20 eggs in a clutch. Females, after laying, will linger around the area. Reproduction normally takes place between May and July. Copulation occurs in May and June, and the lizards normally lay their eggs from the latter part of June through the beginning of July. The eggs are incubated at temperatures from 29 to 31 °C, and hatch after an average of 120 days. At birth, the baby lizards have a total length of around 25 cm. As juvenile desert monitors are never found before the end of March, it is hypothesized that they may hibernate inside their nest.

=== Diet ===
Like most monitor lizards, desert monitors are carnivores. The preferred prey of the species is mice, eggs, or fish, but it will also prey on other small mammals (gerbils and young hares), reptiles (other lizards, snakes, and tortoises), birds, amphibians (toads), insects (beetles, orthopterans, heteropteran bugs, and ants), other invertebrates (snails, centipedes, and scorpions), or carrion, if the opportunity presents itself.

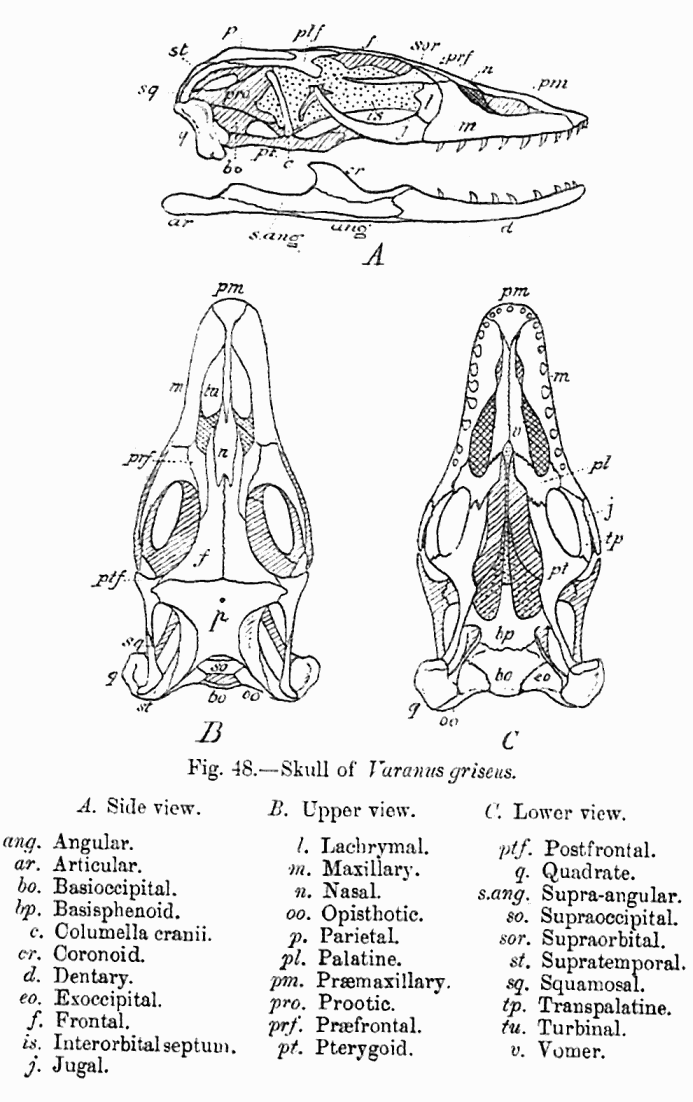
Skull of Varanus griseus

=== Venom ===
Although venom was once thought to be unique to snakes, Gila monsters, and beaded lizards, this is no longer the case. Monitor lizard bite wounds often involve more than just laceration damage. These aftereffects of monitor bites were once thought to be due to oral bacteria alone, but recent studies have shown that venom glands are in the lower jaws of most if not all species.

Degree of envenomation depends on how long the animal is able to bite down and chew on its target to work venom into the wound. Envenomation appears to induce a neurotoxic effect, causing immediate paralysis in rodents (but not birds). In humans, envenomation from the species causes nausea and vomiting, dizziness, muscle pain of eventually the entire body, accelerated heartbeat, complicated breathing, and diarrhea, with symptoms appearing after as little as 20 minutes but ending after around 24 hours, although itching of the bite area can potentially persist for two months at least. An unusual lack of inflammation has been noted.

Along with assistance in immobilizing prey, the venom contains protease, which is known to cause blood clotting disorders, but also helps to digest food through breaking down proteins. Hyaluronidase within the venom has a similar digestive effect, increasing the production of digestive enzymes.

== Conservation ==
A great deal of the land previously inhabited by the subspecies V. g. caspius has been turned into farmland, which puts pressure on the species. Around 17,000 skins of this lizard are involved in commercial trade every year. The species is listed under Appendix I of the Convention on International Trade in Endangered Species of Wild Fauna and Flora (CITES) meaning commercial international trade is prohibited. In northern Africa, central Asia, and parts of India, the species is unprotected from hunting laws and is still hunted commercially. The leather trade of this species has caused some populations to be nearly wiped out.

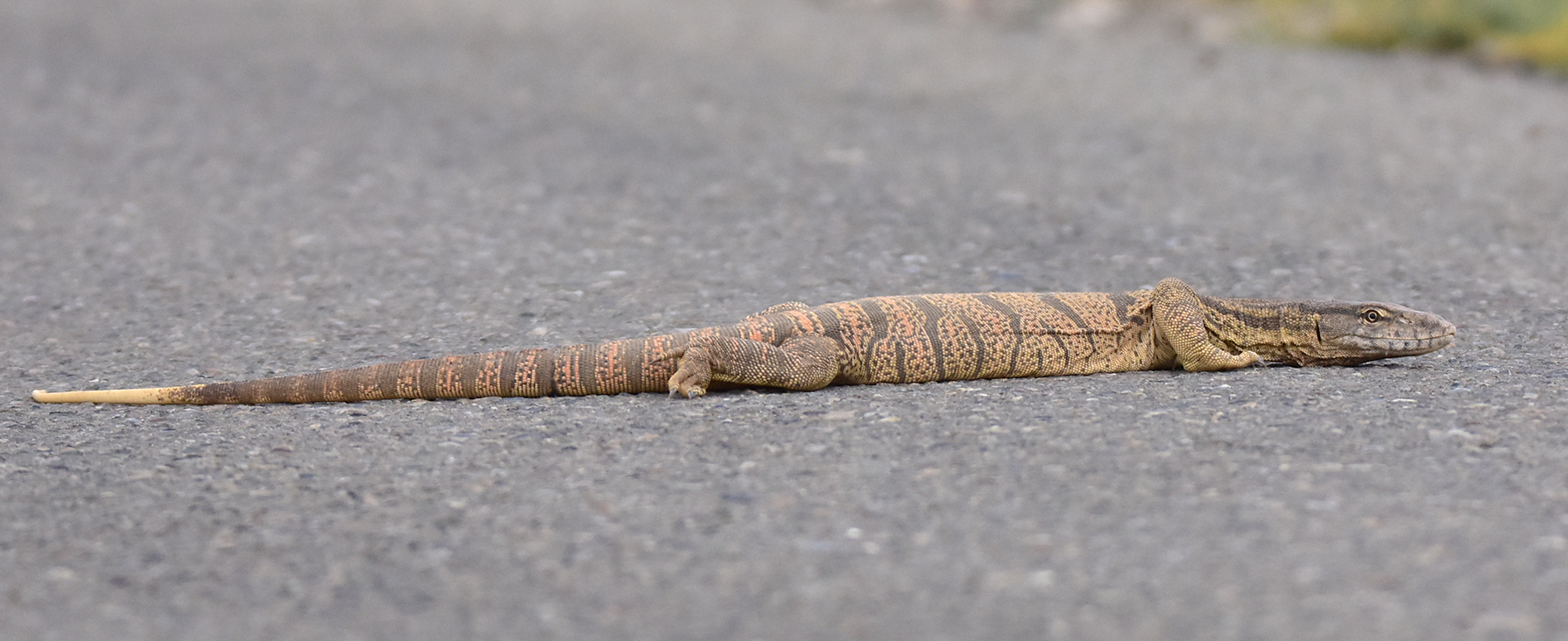
V. g. caspius basking on a road, in Kazakhstan

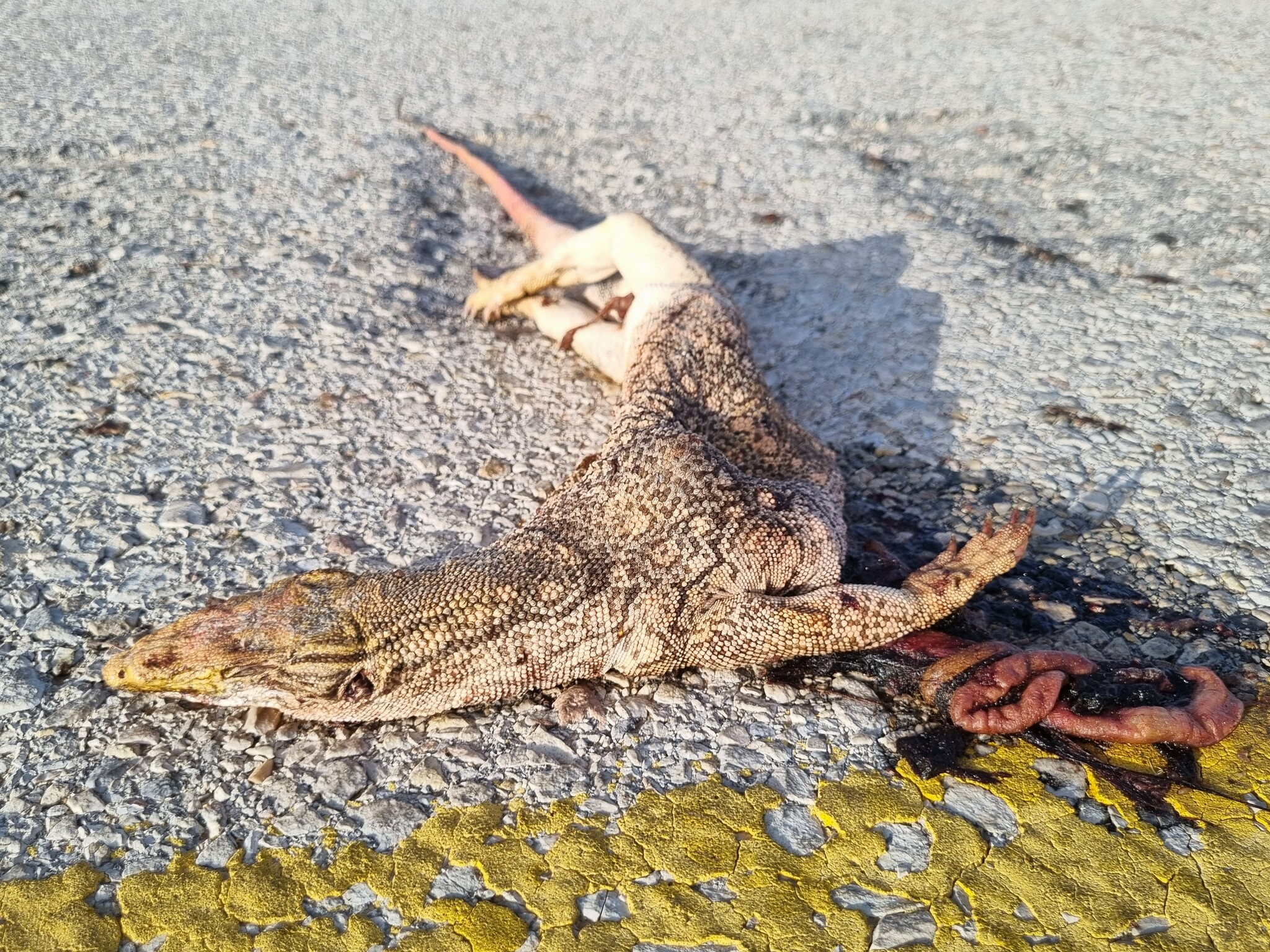
V. g. griseus roadkill, in Saudi Arabia

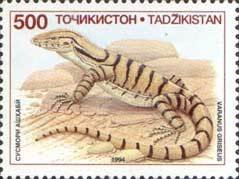
Stamp of Tajikistan

Vehicle collisions are a common cause of death for desert monitors. This is because the species uses the surfaces of roads for basking, and also uses roads when scavenging for roadkill.

A common cause of death in Morocco is the presence of concrete wells used for retaining rainwater, locally called matfias. Desert monitors often climb into these wells and become trapped inside, before eventually dying. Desert monitors becoming trapped in wells is also seen in the Kyzylkum Desert.

Local human populations often have negative attitudes against desert monitors. As a result, desert monitors are often deliberately killed. The majority of the reasons for the dislike of the species are due to local superstitions; in the Kyzylkum Desert, it is said that they bring unhappiness and disease, cause infertility if they run between the legs of humans, take milk from sheep and goats. In a study, roughly half of all shepherds interviewed from the region believed that killing seven desert monitors brings absolution of one's sins. There also exists a more practical reason for the local contempt of the species, as desert monitors do regularly raid hen houses for chicks. In Morocco, similar superstitions exist; locals believe that they attack and break the legs of camels, and that placing the dried carcasses of desert monitors around homes can deter snakes.

Illegal hunting of the species also occurs for their use in alternative medicine.

In 1989, captive breeding of the species occurred successfully for the first time, at Tel Aviv University.

=== Captivity ===
These lizards rarely do well in captivity and at most live only a few years. On occasion, when their living requirements can be specifically met, they have been documented to live for more than 17 years, although they never become docile or accustomed to being handled.

In captivity, their environments should mirror those of many ground-dwelling animals, as well as their natural desert habitat. They require lower temperatures to hibernate during the winter, along with warmer temperatures during the summer months, and their diets in captivity should be similar to their diets in the wild.
