= Australia Walkabout Wildlife Park =

- Interactive map of Australia Walkabout Wildlife Park
- 33.423645°S 151.223281°E
- Date opened: 1 April 2001
- Location: Calga, New South Wales, Australia
- Land area: 80 acres (32 ha)
- No. of species: 180+
- Memberships: ZAA
- Website: www.walkaboutpark.com.au

Australia Walkabout Wildlife Park is a wildlife sanctuary located in Calga, New South Wales, Australia. The wildlife park is home to Australian native birds, mammals and reptiles as well as farm animals. It offers research and education programs, with visitors able to undertake day and night tours. The park is home to a wide range of Australian animals and in 2021 became home to a group of meerkats, the park's first exotic animals.

== Animals found at the park ==
Native bird species include

- Emu
- Australian boobook owl
- Tawny frogmouth
- Laughing kookaburra
- Major Mitchell's cockatoo
- Sulphur-crested cockatoo
- Galah
- Eclectus parrot
- Rainbow lorikeet
- Pacific black duck
- Australian wood duck
- Satin bowerbird
- White-headed pigeon

Non-native bird species include

- Blue peafowl (in petting zoo)
- Domestic goose (in petting zoo)
- Domestic turkey (in petting zoo)
- Brahma chicken (in petting zoo)

Native herptile (reptile and amphibian) species include

- Lace tree goanna
- Eastern water dragon
- Pygmy bearded dragon
- Shingleback lizard
- Eastern blue-tongued lizard
- Cunningham's spiny-tailed skink
- Hosmer's spiny-tailed skink
- Barking gecko
- Olive python
- Murray Darling carpet python
- Centralian carpet python
- Coastal carpet python
- Jungle carpet python
- Diamond python
- Spotted python
- Tiger snake
- Red-bellied black snake
- Common death adder
- Brown tree snake
- Eastern long-necked turtle
- Eastern short-necked turtle
- Eastern dwarf tree frog
- Peron's tree frog
- Eastern froglet
- Red-crowned toadlet

Native mammal species include

- Grey-headed flying-fox
- Dingo
- Short-beaked echidna
- Tasmanian devil
- Spotted-tail quoll
- Eastern quoll
- Bare-nosed wombat
- Southern hairy-nosed wombat
- Koala
- Red kangaroo
- Eastern grey kangaroo
- Eastern hill wallaroo
- Tammar wallaby
- Parma wallaby
- Red-necked wallaby
- Swamp wallaby
- Agile Wallaby
- Red-necked pademelon
- Rufous bettong
- Long-nosed potoroo
- Southeastern common brushtail possum
- Southeastern common ringtail possum
- Sugar glider
- Bilby
- Long-nosed bandicoot
- Spinifex hopping mouse

Non-native mammal species include

- Serval
- Meerkat
- Huacaya alpaca (in petting zoo)
- Domestic pig (in petting zoo)
- Domestic miniature goat (in petting zoo)
- Domestic rabbit (in petting zoo)
- Guinea pig (in petting zoo)
