= Snakes Down Under Reptile Park and Zoo =

Snakes Downunder Reptile Park and Zoo
- Interactive map of Snakes Downunder Reptile Park and Zoo
- 25.239324°S 152.300968°E
- Location: Childers, Queensland, Australia
- No. of species: 45+
- Memberships: ZAA
- Website: www.snakesdownunder.com

Snakes Downunder Reptile Park and Zoo is a zoo situated in Childers, Queensland, Australia. The zoo features Australian reptiles, amphibians and marsupials as well as meerkats.

== Animals ==
=== Reptile species ===
==== Snakes ====
- Australian scrub python
- Black-headed python
- Blue-bellied black snake
- Broad-headed snake
- Brown tree snake
- Carpet python (three subspecies are kept at the park: northwestern, coastal and jungle)
- Coastal taipan
- Collett's snake
- Common death adder
- Eastern brown snake
- Fierce snake
- King brown snake
- Oenpelli python
- Olive python
- Pygmy python
- Red-bellied black snake
- Reticulated python
- Rough-scaled python
- Tiger snake
- Woma python

==== Crocodylians ====
- American alligator
- Freshwater crocodile
- Saltwater crocodile

==== Lizards ====
- Central bearded dragon
- Cunningham's spiny-tailed skink
- Eastern blue-tongued skink
- Eastern water dragon
- Fijian crested iguana
- Frilled lizard
- Green iguana
- Komodo dragon
- Lace monitor
- Mangrove monitor
- Mertens' water monitor
- Perentie
- Plumed basilisk
- Pygmy blue-tongue skink
- Pygmy mulga monitor
- Sand goanna
- Shingleback skink
- Short-tailed pygmy monitor
- Veiled chameleon

==== Testudines ====
- Eastern long-necked turtle
- Radiated tortoise
- Red-bellied short-necked turtle

=== Other animals ===
Their amphibian species are the Australian green tree frogs and white-lipped tree frogs.

Their bird species are emus and hyacinth macaws.

Their mammal species are koalas, Lumholtz's tree kangaroo, red kangaroos, eastern grey kangaroos, tammar wallabies, swamp wallabies, red-necked wallabies and meerkats.
