= David Fleay Wildlife Park =

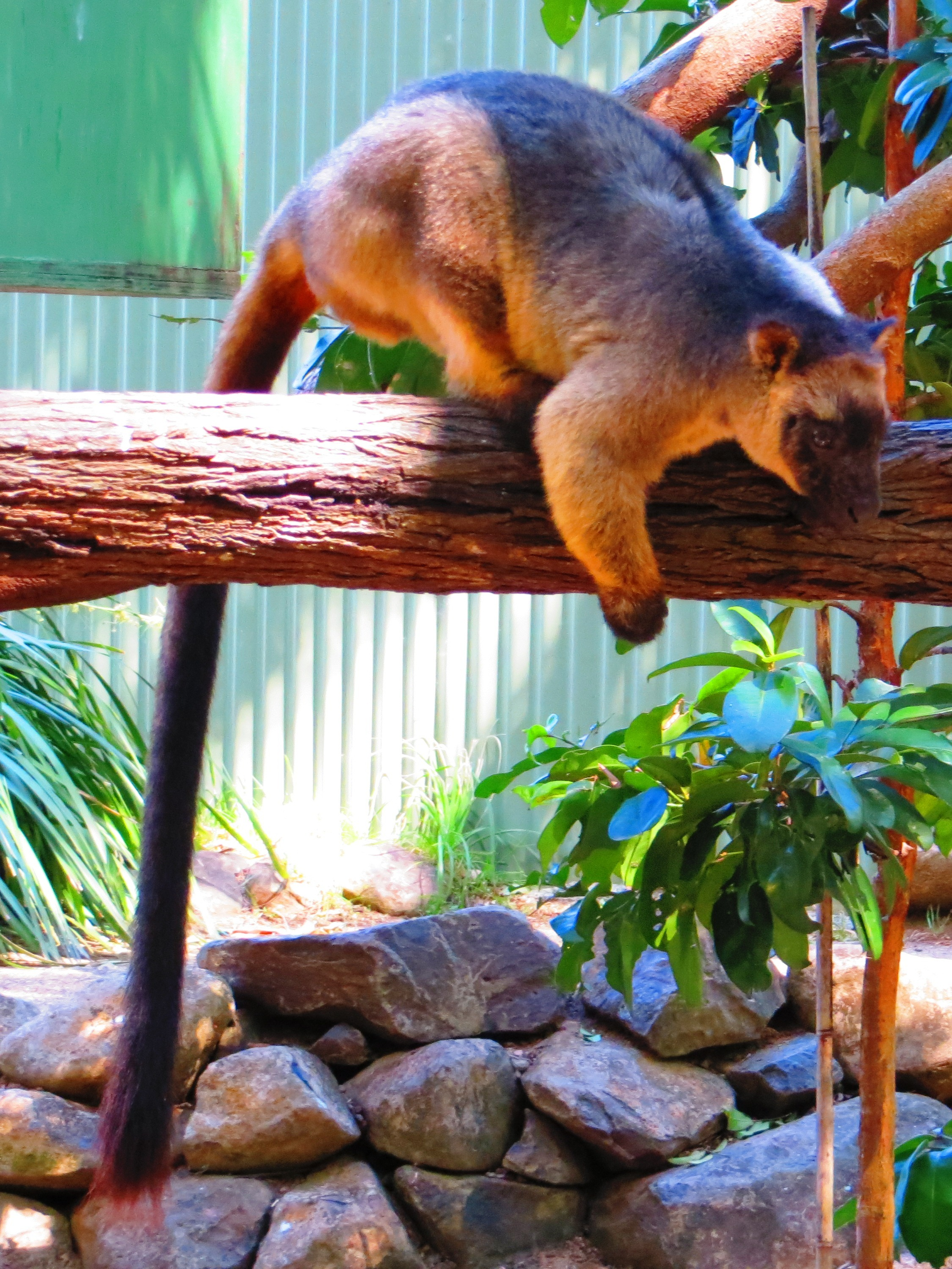
- Lumholtz's tree kangaroo at David Fleay Wildlife Park

- Location within Queensland Location within Australia
- 28.1078°S 153.4437°E
- Location: Fleays Wildlife Park Conservation Park, Tallebudgera Creek Road, Tallebudgera, Queensland, Australia

History
- Design period: 1940s–1960s (post-World War II)
- Built: 1952–1983

Site notes
- Website: https://parks.desi.qld.gov.au/parks/david-fleay

Queensland Heritage Register
- Official name: David Fleay Wildlife Park, Fleays Wildlife Park
- Type: state heritage (built)
- Designated: 23 February 2001
- Reference no.: 601389
- Significant period: 1950s–1983 (fabric)
- Significant components: animal enclosure/s, steps/stairway, car park, pathway/walkway, signage – interpretative, residential accommodation – main house, kiosk

David Fleay Wildlife Park is a heritage-listed wildlife park at Fleays Wildlife Park Conservation Park, Tallebudgera Creek Road, Tallebudgera, Queensland, Australia. It was built from 1952 to 1983. It is also known as Fleays Wildlife Park. It was added to the Queensland Heritage Register on 23 February 2001.

Established by Australian naturalist David Fleay in 1952, the Park today is home to many native animals, which are displayed in surroundings similar to their natural habitats. Managed by the Department of the Environment, Tourism, Science and Innovation, the Park aims to raise community awareness about the need to protect native animals, especially rare and threatened species. The Park has a long tradition of breeding native animals and also includes an animal hospital for sick, injured and orphaned animals.

After investigating areas around Brisbane and South East Queensland, Fleay selected the Tallebudgera Estuary as a suitable site for a fauna reserve in late 1951. He acquired land there for a reserve in 1952, and added further parcels of land to the reserve in 1958 and 1965. Fleay's Fauna Reserve, as it was originally known, was established as a place of scientific research and education. Animals such as southern cassowaries, dingoes, platypuses, owls, crocodiles and pythons lived at the sanctuary in "benevolent captivity", whilst bandicoots, flying foxes, the endangered eastern bristlebirds, white-breasted sea eagles, wallabies and koalas were free to come and go as they pleased. The Nocturnal house provides visitors the opportunity to view nocturnal animals such as the fat-tailed dunnart, southern greater glider, bilby and mahogany sugar glider.

In order to ensure the future survival of the sanctuary, David and Sigrid Fleay sold a large portion of the reserve (37 acres (15 ha)) to the Queensland Government in 1982, which became a Conservation Park. The main area of the Fauna Reserve housing the animals (20 acres (8.1 ha)) was also sold to the Government the following year. The remainder of the site (7.5 acres (3.0 ha)) was transferred to the Government in 1985. David and Sigrid Fleay continued to live at Fleay's Wildlife Park following the transfer of ownership, where David continued his research and kept animals, such as kangaroos, emus, cassowaries and his Galápagos tortoise, Harriet, largely in their original enclosures. The Park closed in 1983 for redevelopment, re-opening in 1988. David Fleay died on 7 August 1993. In October 1995, 7.4488 hectares (18.406 acres) of the site was gazetted as Fleay's Wildlife Park Conservation Park under the Nature Conservation Act 1992 (Qld) and today is operated by the Queensland Parks and Wildlife Service for the people of Queensland. The Park was renamed David Fleay Wildlife Park in 1997, in tribute to its founder.

== Fauna ==
Current species at David Fleay Wildlife Park

Bird species include: Australasian darter; Australian pelican; Australian white ibis; Barking owl; Black swan; Black-necked stork; Brolga; Bush stone-curlew; Dusky moorhen; Eastern barn owl; Eastern bristlebird; Eclectus parrot; Emu; Great egret; Little black cormorant; Magpie goose; Nankeen night heron; Plumed whistling duck; Rufous night-heron; Scrub turkey; Southern cassowary; Tawny frogmouth; Wedge-tailed eagle and White-bellied sea eagle.

Mammal species include: Agile wallaby; Bilby; Black-footed tree-rat; Bridled nail-tail wallaby; Common ringtail possum; Common wallaroo; Dingo; Eastern grey kangaroo; Fat-tailed dunnart; Grey-headed flying-fox; Koala; Little red flying-fox; Long-nosed bandicoot; long-nosed potoroo; Lumholtz's tree-kangaroo; Mahogany sugar glider; Northern brown bandicoot; Platypus; Proserpine rock-wallaby; Red-legged pademelon; Red-necked wallaby; Short-eared possum; Southern greater glider; Spinifex hopping mouse; Squirrel glider and Swamp wallaby.

Reptile species include: Carpet pythons (Coastal, Jungle and Murray Darling); Eastern short-neck turtle; Eastern bearded dragon; eastern water dragon; Freshwater crocodile; Green tree python; Lace goanna; Mary River turtle; Olive python; Saltwater crocodile; Shingleback lizard; Southern angle-headed dragon; Water python; Woma python.

== History ==
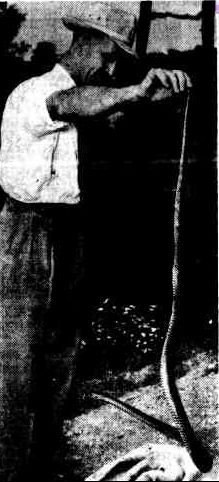
David Fleay and a brown snake, 1954

The David Fleay Wildlife Park was established by David Fleay in 1951 as a place of research and education.

David Howells Fleay was born in Ballarat in 1907 and established an interest in the Australian bush and its wildlife at an early age. Fleay accepted a teaching position at Ballarat Grammar School and, in 1927, moved to Melbourne where he taught whilst studying for a Bachelor of Science degree and a Diploma of Education at Melbourne University. At Melbourne University he met fellow science student, Mary Sigrid Collie, and they married in 1931, the year in which David Fleay graduated in Zoology, Botany and Education.

Between 1931 and 1934, Fleay taught at the Ballarat Church of England Grammar School and at State primary and secondary schools, while continuing his private study of native animals. By 1934 his reputation as a "wildlife man" was sufficiently established that, when Melbourne Zoo decided to set up an Australian section as part of Melbourne's centenary celebrations, David Fleay was chosen to design and direct the section. He worked there for three and a half years, during which time he was able to achieve some significant scientific "firsts" such as the first breeding in captivity of emus, scrub turkeys, some birds of prey, the tawny frogmouth and a variety of marsupials including the koala. He constructed his first platypussary (a home for platypuses). His time, however, with the Melbourne Zoo was not particularly happy as he disagreed with management on matters of principle. Reflecting his naturalist's viewpoint rather than traditional zoologists' thinking, he insisted that native birds and animals should be fed what they would eat in the wild. He was dismissed over this issue in 1937.

By chance, the wildlife sanctuary at Healesville, about 90 kilometres (56 mi) north-east of Melbourne, needed to replace Robert Eadie, who had been the honorary Curator since the early 1930s. In 1937, Fleay was appointed at £7 per week, the first paid Director of the sanctuary, to develop Healesville's wildlife sanctuary on temperate rainforest on Badger Creek. Fleay introduced 95 large tiger snakes to the sanctuary which were displayed on an island and milked for antivenene purposes. At Healesville, Fleay recommenced his breeding and conservation programs in earnest, achieving worldwide recognition. His greatest achievement at Healesville was breeding the first platypus is captivity in 1943. He designed and built a new platypussary, and, in November 1943, "Corrie" the platypus was born. Despite numerous attempts by other scientist and sanctuaries, Fleay remains the only person to have successfully bred and reared a platypus in captivity.

In 1947, David and Sigrid Fleay travelled with three platypuses to New York's Bronx Zoo. The platypuses were accommodated in a new platypussary at the zoo, designed to Fleay's specifications. During the Fleay's stay in the United States, Fleay inspected the modern methods of housing and feeding animals at a number of zoos including the New York Zoological Park, Staten Island Zoo, National Zoological Park in Washington and the Golden Gate Zoo in San Francisco. It is not known whether he brought back with him from the United States any ideas which he intended to implement in Australia.

David Fleay returned to Healesville on 13 October 1947 to discover that the Board had fired him during his absence, for the alleged unauthorised donation of other sanctuary animals to the Americans. Whilst the accusation was false, this did not diminish the Board's hostility toward Fleay. After much public outcry, Fleay continued in a lesser role at Healesville as a consultant. Fleay continued to maintain his private fauna collection until 1951 when the Victorian Government banned private individuals from asking for and accepting admission fees from members of the public wishing to view personal collections of native fauna. This situation prompted Fleay to find a more suitable location which would enable him to carry out his research into the life and habits of native birds, animals and reptiles, and consequently, he and Sigrid Fleay moved north to Queensland.

In late 1951 David Fleay, after investigating around Brisbane and south-east Queensland, selected the Tallebudgera Estate as a suitable site for a fauna reserve. According to Fleay, the attraction of the site was the flood-free forested slopes and gullies, good run off, koala fodder gums with koalas in residence and the presence of fish, mammals and birds. The area at the time was used by small crop farmers who supplied the Victorian market in winter. The site preferred by Fleay comprised three properties owned by three separate individuals. Further, the land was not for sale and Fleay did not have the capital to purchase.

Persistence paid off, however, and Fleay steadily acquired the land in the names of DH and MS Fleay. He acquired Portions 20A (just over four acres), 21A (just over four acres) and 22C (just over nine acres) in May 1952. In July 1952, Portion 23A (just over seven acres) was purchased in Mary Sigrid Fleay's name. Portion 18A (just over twenty-one acres) was bought in October 1952. Further land acquisitions were made in June 1958 with the purchase of Portion 19A (just over 15 acres (6.1 ha)) and later, around 1965 a purchase of just over seven acres. This last portion became an additional car park.

Fleay's West Burleigh sanctuary was to be a place of research and education and David Fleay objected to descriptions of the place as a zoo. Fleay stated that "It's a place where the animals are kept in conditions as close as possible to the natural environment - where they can breed freely and be studied" and "We're not in the job of sacrificing animals for the sake of showing them and I don't have a lot of time for many modern zoos."

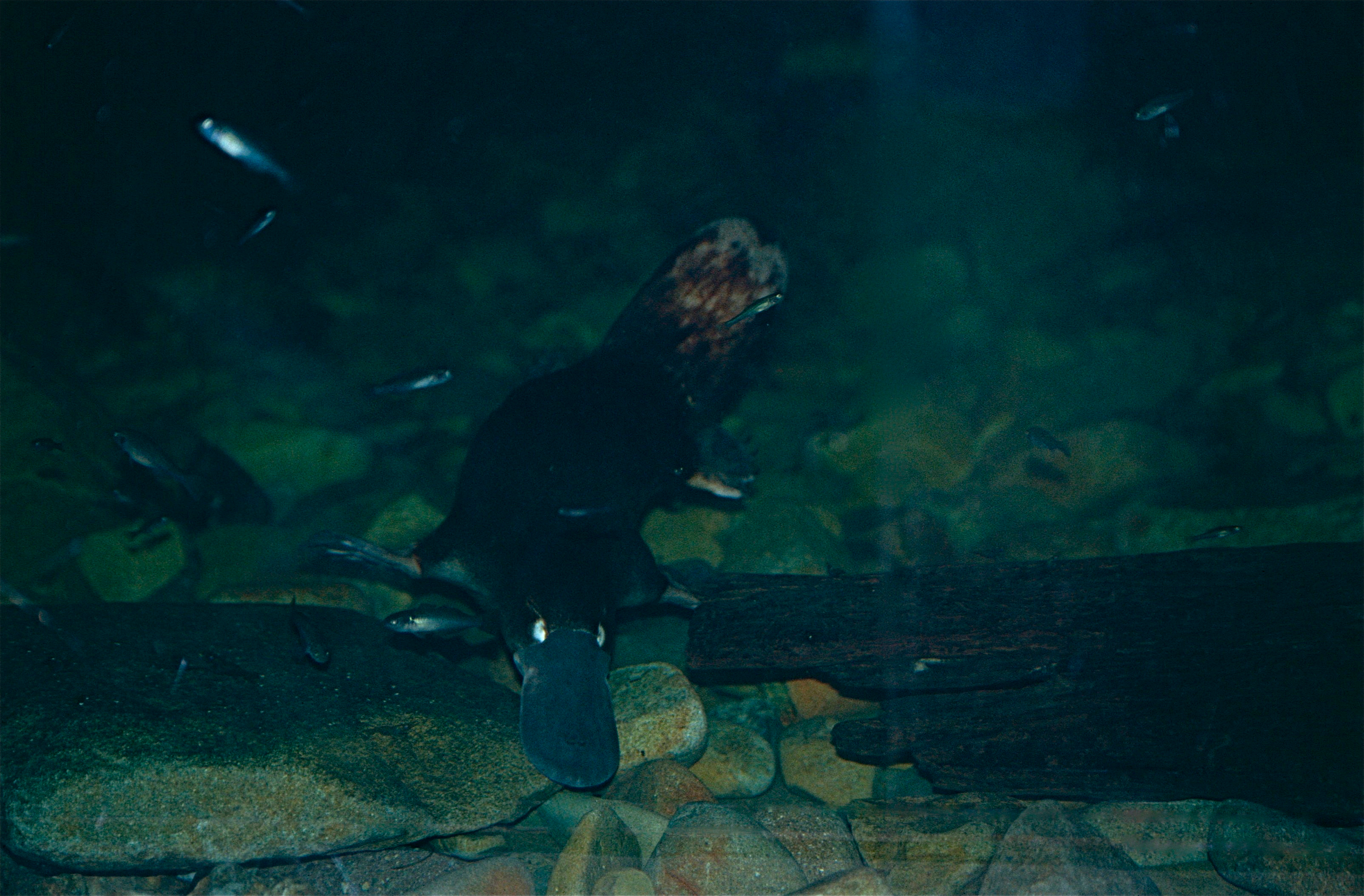
Platypus at David Fleay's, 2000

Many of Fleay's animals were transported from Victoria and so animal enclosures were built rapidly. By October 1952, Fleay had constructed an interim platypussary. This was a large concrete water tank with artificial burrows and straw at one end, based on his design at Healesville. Large aviaries for the sea eagles, wedge-tailed eagles and the peregrine falcons were constructed, along with accommodation for the barking owl, great eagle owl and white goshawk. The barking owls' cages were built close to the house so that David Fleay could hear them.

The original layout of the sanctuary was designed by Fleay, who used a compass to ensure that each cage received breezes and the morning sun. Fleay designed the cages and specified the dimensions and the "furniture". The cages were always painted "Lawn Green" with "Mail Red" roofs. The timber was not undercoated or chemically treated. Chickenwire covered the platypus tank and raptors' cages to keep out carpet snakes. The sanctuary opened its doors to its first visitors on Easter Sunday 1952. Steadily new cages were built by David Fleay and his volunteers. The wedge-tailed eagles had a large timber enclosure with a frame inside in which they could build a nest. The cages had an inner shell of wire netting to guard against cyclonic blows and carpet pythons.

In 1955, a new, outdoor variety platypussary was constructed. This platypussary was later taken over by scrub turkeys who buried it under mounds of earth. A new, superior platypussary was built in 1958 with money provided by the United States in return for three platypuses taken by David Fleay to New York's Bronx Zoo.

The sanctuary survived principally through the hard work of David Fleay and his family, and at times, with the assistance of the local community. The family tended the animals and Sigrid Fleay provided teas on the verandah of the house to visitors. Sick and injured animals were brought to Fleays at all hours of the day and night, and at its peak the sanctuary cared for 450 animals. Volunteer labour and donations were vital to the sanctuary's survival.

The Fleay house was the original farmhouse on the property and, by its style and details, appears to have been built around 1910. It was purchased by Fleay in 1952 and was used as both the Fleay family residence and the base of operations for Fleays wildlife park during David Fleay's running of the place. From the period 1952 to 1985 the upper floor was used principally as the Fleay's residence. The lower floor was used for a range of park activities. Sick and injured animals were treated; food for the animals was prepared, including breeding rats and mice for food and snake specimens in bottles lined the walls. After the handover of the park to the Queensland Government in 1983, Fleay continued to live in the house until his wife's death in 1987, during which time the house was modified. After remarrying in 1987, Fleay left the house and lived in another residence adjacent to the park. He returned to live in the house in 1991 until his death in 1993.

David Fleay's achievements at the sanctuary were numerous. In 1955, he achieved the first known captive breeding of the mulgara, followed in 1958 by the breeding of the planigale (a midget marsupial). In 1958 he successfully delivered a further three platypuses to New York's Bronx Zoo and later that year was able to construct a new and improved platypussary at the West Burleigh sanctuary with a small grant awarded to him by the New York Zoological Society. In 1959, he achieved the first captive breeding of the taipan. Possibly his best known successes at Fleays were with owls and other birds of prey. His was the first known captive breeding of the powerful owl (1968), sooty owl (1969), grey goshawk (1971), mainland masked owl (1971), grass owl (1972), crested hawk (1975) and the wedge-tailed eagle (1977).

In 1970, Fleay continued his attempts to breed platypuses in a platypussary which, although slightly modernised, was largely similar to the one he built at Healesville, 28 years previously. There was no similar success at the sanctuary, although in 1972, Fleay did discover a small dead baby (50 days old) at the entrance to the burrow.

In recognition of the quality and value of his research and breeding programs, Fleay was awarded an MBE in 1960, an AM and Advance Australia Award in 1980 and was appointed an Associate of the Queensland Museum in 1978. In 1979, Fleay was appointed a Fellow of the Explorers' Club in New York. The accolades continued in 1984 when he was awarded an honorary Doctorate of Science by the University of Queensland and appointed a Rotary Paul Harris Fellow.

To ensure that the Fleays' sanctuary could survive intact, David and Sigrid Fleay decided to sell the land to the Queensland Government for a nominal amount. In 1982, a large portion of the land owned by the Fleays (37 acres (15 ha)) was sold to the government. The following year, the main area of the Fauna Reserve where the animals were enclosed (20 acres (8.1 ha)) was also sold to the government. The remainder of the site (7.5 acres (3.0 ha)) was transferred in 1985. This is the current public carpark. Under the terms of the handover, the Fleays continued to live at the sanctuary.

Some of the old enclosures, such as the old goshawk enclosure, were deemed beyond repair and were demolished. Minor repairs were made to the platypussary and small adjustments made to the barking owl aviary. A new platypus display and barking owl and powerful owl cages were designed by Fleay and were positioned according to his specifications. Fleay continued to work at Fleays Wildlife Park (as it was known) and to keep animals largely in their original enclosures. In 1983 the park closed for redevelopment. It reopened in July 1987, but without the original precinct being open to the public as it was considered unsafe.

David Fleay died on 7 August 1993 and his death was lamented by many. The regard in which he was held by his professional colleagues and the community is partly illustrated by the awards and honours bestowed upon him during his lifetime.

In October 1995, 7.4488 hectares (18.406 acres) of the site was gazetted as the "David Fleay Wildlife Park" under the Nature Conservation Act 1992, and is operated by the Environmental Protection Agency (Queensland)Queensland Parks and Wildlife Service. Currently, the original precinct is off-limits to the public due mainly to the poor condition of the concrete paths and some enclosures. It is used for holding off-displays and sick or injured animals and for captive breeding. Many of the original enclosures are still in use.

== Description ==
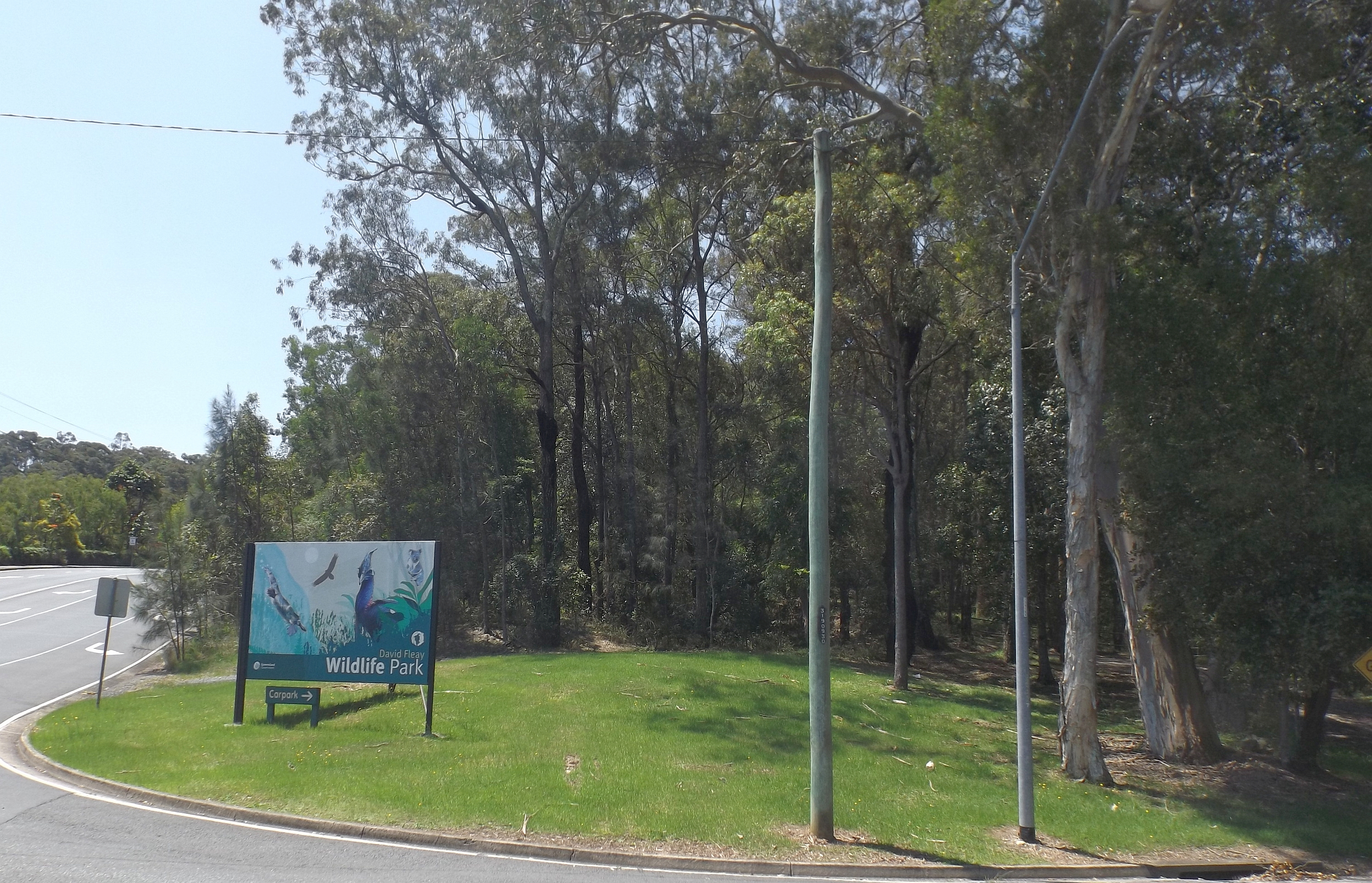
Entrance sign, 2015

The original section of the David Fleay Wildlife Park comprises an area in the south-central section of the park. Over the years, the park has expanded so that it now almost completely surrounds the original section. David Fleay Wildlife Park is surrounded by 37.3 hectares (92 acres) of conservation park (Tallebudgera Creek Conservation Park). Part of the David Fleay Wildlife Park is bordered by Tallebudgera Creek Road to the west and Kabool Road to the south.

There are a number of enclosures and structures in the original precinct. Some enclosures were purpose-built, such as the platypussary, which was used exclusively for keeping platypuses. Other enclosures and structures, however, have been used for many purposes and to keep different animals over time.

The aviary, platypussary and the former Fleay home are located in the original section of the David Fleay Wildlife Park, to the south of the main section.

=== Aviary (Wedge-tailed Eagle Enclosure) (enc 1) ===
The aviary is 9.1 metres (30 ft) long x 4.8 metres (16 ft) wide x approximately 5.0 metres (16.4 ft) high. It is a sawn timber-framed structure with birdwire to the walls and roof. The south-west corner of the walls and roof are partially enclosed with Super-6 corrugated asbestos cement and corrugated iron. Some corrugated iron sheeting, approximately 600 mil1imetres, has been used to retain the high south side. Perches are made from sawn timber and some tree branches.

=== Platypussary (enc 4 – second enclosure) ===
The platypussary is constructed on a concrete slab. It is 9.5 metres (31 ft) long x 4.9 metres (16 ft) wide x approximately 3.5 metres (11 ft) high and is an open-sided timber-framed structure supported on sawn timber posts. The structure has a Super-6 corrugated asbestos cement roof with small areas of translucent roof sheeting. The platypussary has been partially enclosed with hardboard sheeting to the north and south ends.

The long, narrow, in-situ poured concrete and fibreglass covered concrete blockwork contains tanks with fine steel mesh covers. The concrete blockwork and in-situ poured concrete burrowing chambers are attached to the eastern and western ends of the tanks. Some early signage remains intact in the platypussary.

=== Former Fleay Home ===
The house is a timber-framed, weatherboard clad, corrugated iron roofed building with a pyramidal hip roof extended in bungalow style over the verandahs with a small gable to the front porch. The lower floor has been enclosed with flat asbestos cement sheets. Various windows treatments include timber casement, sliding, and double-hung windows and more recent aluminium sliding windows. The verandahs on the western and southern sides have been partially enclosed.

Internally, the walls and ceilings are predominantly lined with vertically joined tongue and groove boards with door openings incorporating decorative timber arches and fanlight panels with Federation era motifs. Much of the interior has been painted white. A modern kitchen has been installed. The bathroom has also been refitted. A Super-6 corrugated asbestos cement-lined carport is attached to the eastern side of the house. Currently, the downstairs area is used for storage and the upstairs area is unoccupied.

Other enclosures within the original precinct include:

=== Tree Kangaroo/Scrub Turkey Enclosure (enc 2) ===
The enclosure is built on a concrete slab on the ground, measuring 7.9 by 5.1 metres (26 by 17 ft) approximately. It is a 3.5 metres (11 ft) high timber-framed structure with birdwire to the north, east and south walls and eastern half of the roof. In the south-west corner, the walls are sheeted with flat asbestos cement roofing.

=== Owls Enclosure [Spare] (enc 3) ===
The enclosure is a 2.5 metres (8 ft 2 in) high, timber-framed structure sheeted with asbestos cement to much of the perimeter and birdwire to the remaining area. The enclosure measures 3.3 by 2.2 metres (10.8 by 7.2 ft). It has a super-6 corrugated asbestos cement roof.

=== Barking Owl Enclosure (enc 5) ===
Measuring 4.7 by 2.7 metres (15.4 by 8.9 ft), the enclosure is an approximately 3 metres (9.8 ft) high, timber-framed structure sheeted with flat fibre cement to the east side and chickenwire to the north side. A super-6 corrugated asbestos cement is located to the south the retaining wall and to the western side and west end of the roof. Chickenwire is located at the east end of the roof. Some early signage remains intact.

=== Saltwater Crocodile and Alligator Pool (enc 6) ===
The shallow concrete pool is surrounded by 10.2 by 7.6 metres (33 by 25 ft) by 1-metre (3 ft 3 in) high concrete blockwork walls topped with steel tube posts and birdwire used to enclose the sides and roof. Viewing panels are located in the northern wall with timber posts below, providing possible evidence for a former viewing platform. A timber sleeper retaining wall is located to the south side of the pool.

=== 'Winter-Sun' – Flying Fox and Carpet Python Enclosure (enc 7) ===
The enclosure is built on a concrete slab on the ground, measuring 4.2-by-3.7-metre (14 by 12 ft) half-height concrete walls with timber-framed walls and roof above. Birdwire and woven wire mesh is located above the concrete walls. The structure has a super-6 corrugated asbestos cement roof with some translucent sheeting and wire mesh panels. The structure is enclosed on the east, south and most of the west sides and is open on the northern side. Some early signage remains intact.

=== Taipanary (enc 8) ===
The enclosure is built on a concrete slab on the ground, measuring 7.3 by 9.2 metres (24 by 30 ft). The enclosure is a 3 metres (9.8 ft) high, timber-framed structure sheeted with corrugated iron. The roof is steel framed with approximately 30% covered with super-6 corrugated asbestos cement and the remainder covered with birdwire and hessian sacks.

=== Goura Pigeons Enclosure – 2nd Enclosure (enc 9) ===
The enclosure is a 12.6 by 6 metres (41 by 20 ft) by 4-metre (13 ft) high tubular, steel framed structure on a concrete blockwork base. The walls and roof are covered with chainwire except for the south-west corner, which is covered with shadowline asbestos cement sheeting. The earth floor has slate "waterfall" and "creek" water features.

=== Goura Pigeons Enclosure – Original Enclosure (enc 10) ===
The enclosure has an earth floor and measures 4.6 by 3.1 metres (15 by 10 ft). The timber-framed structure is approximately 3 metres (9.8 ft) high with walls to the east, south and west sides sheeted with flat asbestos cement. The enclosure is open to the north side with fine metal mesh. Approximately 70% of the roof is covered with super-6 corrugated asbestos cement, while the remainder is covered with fine mesh. Super-6 corrugated asbestos cement sheeting is located on the south retaining wall.

=== Cuscus Enclosure (enc 11) ===
The enclosure is built on a concrete slab on the ground, measuring 3.7 by 2.4 metres (12.1 by 7.9 ft). The enclosure is a 2.5 metres (8 ft 2 in) high, timber-framed structure sheeted with flat asbestos cement to the east, south and west sides. The enclosure is open to the north side with mesh. The roof is sheeted with super-6 corrugated asbestos cement

=== Fluffy Gliders (enc 13) ===
The enclosure is built on a concrete slab on the ground, measuring 2.5 by 2 metres (8 ft 2 in by 6 ft 7 in). The enclosure is a 2-metre (6 ft 7 in) high timber-framed structure on a concrete blockwork upstand. The enclosure is built up against a kiosk block wall to the east. The north and south walls are sheeted with flat fibre cement. Open mesh is located on the west side. The roof is sheeted with super-6 corrugated asbestos cement with a small mesh section.

=== Kiosk – 2nd Kiosk (building 14) ===
The enclosure is built on a concrete slab on the ground, measuring 6.7 by 6.7 metres (22 by 22 ft). The enclosure is a 4-metre (13 ft) high unpainted concrete blockwork structure with a timber-framed, red, concrete-tiled gable roof and aluminium windows. Some early signage remains intact.

=== Powerful Owl Enclosure (enc 15) ===
The enclosure is built on a sloping concrete slab on the ground, measuring 6.6 by 3.1 metres (22 by 10 ft). The enclosure is an approximately 4-metre (13 ft) high timber-framed structure, clad on all sides with unpainted sawn hardwood weatherboards. Birdwire is located in a panel in the centre of the north wall. The roof is clad with super-6 corrugated asbestos cement sheeting except for a central mesh panel. A meshed horizontal vent panel is located at a low level on the southern side.

=== Tasmanian Devils Enclosure (enc 16) ===
The enclosure measures 5.2 by 3.1 metres (17 by 10 ft). It is an approximately 3-metre (9.8 ft) high timber-framed structure with super-6-formed base walls to the south and part of the east walls with sheet metal above to the east and north. Vertical timber boarding is located on the remaining base walls with fine metal mesh above to the east and north. The roof is sheeted with super-6 corrugated asbestos cement roof sheeting.

=== Crested Hawks Enclosure – 2nd Enclosure (enc 17) ===
The enclosure measures 7.1 by 3.6 metres (23 by 12 ft) by approximately 4 metres (13 ft) high. It is a tubular, steel-framed structure with metal mesh to the walls and roof. The south-east corner walls and roof are enclosed with corrugated iron. Original black paint has weathered back to bare metal.

=== Squirrel Gliders and Carpet Pythons Enclosure (enc 18) ===
The enclosure is built on a concrete slab on the ground, measuring 5.5 by 2.5 metres (18.0 by 8.2 ft). It is a 2.5-metre (8 ft 2 in) high timber-framed structure enclosed on the east, south and west sides with super-6 corrugated asbestos cement sheeting. Full-height birdwire is located on part of the northern side. A half-height super-6-formed concrete wall is located to the remainder of the northern side. The skillion roof is sheeted with super-6 corrugated asbestos cement.

=== Tortoise and Freshwater Crocodile Enclosure (enc 19) ===
The enclosure is a concrete slab on the ground measuring 5.2 by 2.5 metres (17.1 by 8.2 ft) with a sloping pond floor. In-situ poured concrete base walls have tubular steel framing with wire mesh located on the upper half of the north wall.

=== Reptiles Enclosure (enc 20) ===
The enclosure measures 3.3 by 2.2 metres (10.8 by 7.2 ft). It is an approximately 2.5 metres (8 ft 2 in) high timber-framed structure with timber boarding to the lower walls and angled metal mesh above the north side. The south side is fully enclosed with flat asbestos cement sheeting. The skillion roof is sheeted with super-6 corrugated asbestos cement.

=== Brown Snakes Enclosure (enc 21) ===
The enclosure measures 4.6 by 2.5 metres (15.1 by 8.2 ft). It is an approximately 2.5-metre (8 ft 2 in) high structure with concrete blockwork base walls and tubular steel posts supporting upper level metal mesh and a super-6 corrugated asbestos cement skillion roof. Flat asbestos cement sheeting is located on the west wall. The enclosure has elaborate timber perches and a steel framed and sheeted gate.

=== Rattle Snakes Enclosure (enc 22) ===
The enclosure is built on a concrete slab on the ground, measuring 3.3 by 2.4 metres (10.8 by 7.9 ft). It is an approximately 2.4-metre (7 ft 10 in) high structure with base walls sheeted with flat asbestos cement and timber boarding. The upper walls are covered with angled metal mesh. The structure is fully enclosed with plywood sheeting to the south-east corner. The eastern side of the skillion roof is sheeted with super-6 corrugated asbestos cement.

=== Hairy-nosed Wombats Enclosure (enc 23) ===
The enclosure is built on a concrete slab on the ground, measuring 9.6 by 4.8 metres (31 by 16 ft). It is an approximately 1.2-metre (3 ft 11 in) high semi-circular concrete blockwork structure open to the air except for a small reinforced concrete roofed area in the north-east corner. Reinforced concrete pipe tunnels are inserted in the east and west ends.

=== Flinders Island Wombats Enclosure (enc 24) ===
The enclosure is built on a concrete slab on the ground, measuring 6.8 by 2.4 metres (22.3 by 7.9 ft). It is an approximately 2.5-metre (8 ft 2 in) high timber-framed structure with super-6-formed concrete lower walls. The structure has fine metal mesh to the west wall and full height super-6 corrugated asbestos cement sheeting to the south-east corner. The structure has a super-6 corrugated asbestos cement skillion roof with mesh panelling to the west end.

=== Potteroos Enclosure (enc 26) ===
The enclosure measures 7.5 by 3.7 metres (25 by 12 ft). It is an approximately 1-metre (3 ft 3 in) high timber-framed and sheet metal clad fence, with tubular steel posts angled in to support a birdwire perimeter to approximately 1.8 metres (5 ft 11 in) high.

=== Wedge-tailed Eagle Enclosure – Original enclosure (enc 27) ===
The enclosure measures 9.6 by 6.7 metres (31 by 22 ft). It is an approximately 4-metre (13 ft) high timber-framed structure with sapling corner posts and sawn timber framing. The walls are enclosed on the eastern half with birdwire and on the western half with super-6 corrugated asbestos cement sheeting. The structure has a super-6 corrugated asbestos cement flat roof. It has been substantially altered from the original by roofing and wall enclosures.

=== Grass Owls Enclosure (enc 28) ===
The enclosure is built on a concrete slab on the ground, measuring 6.4 by 3.9 metres (21 by 13 ft). It is an approximately 4-metre (13 ft) high timber-framed structure enclosed on the east, south and west sides with flat asbestos sheeting and hessian, and on the north side with birdwire and hessian. The structure has a super-6 corrugated asbestos cement gable roof.

=== Platypussary – Original enclosure (enc 29) ===
The enclosure is built on a concrete slab on the ground, measuring 6.4 by 3.2 metres (21 by 10 ft). It is an approximately 3-metre (9.8 ft) high timber-framed structure enclosed on the east, south and west sides with flat asbestos cement sheeting and vertical timber boarding. It is enclosed on the north side with birdwire. The structure has a super-6 corrugated asbestos cement skillion roof t the west end and a birdwire roof to the east end. A small enclosure is located to the west of the platypussary.

=== Boobook Owls Enclosure (enc 30) ===
The enclosure is a 1.9-metre-sided (6.2 ft) octagonal timber-framed structure with an octastyle roof.

=== Koalas Enclosure (enc 31) ===
The enclosure is built on a concrete slab on the ground, measuring 8 by 3.4 metres (26 by 11 ft). It is an approximately 4-metre (13 ft) high tubular steel-framed structure enclosed to the east and south sides with shadowline asbestos cement sheeting and chickenwire to the north and west sides. The structure has a metal deck gable roof with a central panel of chickenwire.

=== Death Adders Enclosure (enc 32) ===
The enclosure is built on a concrete slab on the ground, measuring 1.2 by 1.2 metres (3 ft 11 in by 3 ft 11 in). It is an approximately 1.2-metre (3 ft 11 in) high timber-framed structure on concrete base walls. The east and west walls are enclosed with flat asbestos cement sheeting. The north and south walls are open. The structure has a super-6 asbestos cement skillion roof. The enclosure contains an early chopping block possibly from the house.

=== Cockatoos Enclosure (enc 33) ===
The enclosure is built on a concrete slab on the ground, measuring 5.5 by 1.7 metres (18.0 by 5.6 ft). It is an approximately 3-metre (9.8 ft) high tubular steel-framed structure covered in chainwire. The south half of the gable roof is covered with super-6 corrugated asbestos cement sheeting. The upper parts of the south wall are enclosed with flat asbestos cement sheeting.

=== Platypuses Enclosure (enc 34) ===
The enclosure is built on a concrete slab on the ground, measuring 10.2 by 8.8 metres (33 by 29 ft). It is an approximately 3-metre (9.8 ft) high open-sided post-supported timber structure with a super-6 corrugated asbestos cement skillion roof. The structure has fibreglass lined concrete blockwork tanks with concrete blockwork burrowing chambers. A timber deck is located on the north side.

=== Platypuses Enclosure (enc 34) ===
The enclosure is built on a concrete slab on the ground, measuring 4.4 by 1.8 metres (14.4 by 5.9 ft). It is an approximately 3-metre (9.8 ft) high timber-framed structure with walls enclosed to the eastern half with flat asbestos cement sheeting and on the western half with birdwire. The structure has a super-6 corrugated asbestos cement gable roof to the eastern half and birdwire to the western half.

=== Enclosure 36 (Use unknown) ===
The enclosure is built on a concrete slab on the ground, measuring 1.2 by 1 metre (3 ft 11 in by 3 ft 3 in). It is an approximately 1-metre (3 ft 3 in) high timber-framed structure with walls enclosed on three sides and woven mesh to the north side. The structure has a super-6 corrugated asbestos cement skillion roof.

=== Enclosure 37 ===
The enclosure is built on a concrete slab on the ground, measuring 1.6 by 1.4 metres (5 ft 3 in by 4 ft 7 in). It is an approximately 2-metre (6 ft 7 in) high timber-framed structure with walls enclosed on the east, south and west sides with flat asbestos cement sheeting. It is open to the north side. The structure has a super-6 corrugated asbestos cement skillion roof attached to the house.

=== Kite Enclosure (enc 38) ===
The enclosure has an earth floor and measures 4.2 by 2 metres (13.8 by 6.6 ft). It is an approximately 2.5-metre (8 ft 2 in) high timber-framed structure with flat asbestos cement sheeting to the south-east corner and chickenwire to the remaining walls. The structure has a super-6 corrugated asbestos cement skillion roof to the east end with chickenwire to the west end.

=== Sooty Owls Enclosure (enc 39) ===
The enclosure is built on a concrete slab on the ground, measuring 5.2 by 4.5 metres (17 by 15 ft). It is an approximately 3-metre (9.8 ft) high timber-framed structure enclosed along the western half with flat asbestos cement sheeting and along the eastern half with chickenwire. The structure has a super-6 corrugated asbestos cement skillion roof.

A network of paths and stairs connects most of the enclosures to both the house and the original public carpark and entry off Kabool Road. These are generally laid out in an east–west direction paralleling the natural contours of the site. The level pathways are connected between levels by stairways running north–south. Much of the path network has been damaged by either ground subsidence or tree root movement. Other miscellaneous structures include a range of modern, pre-fabricated meal sheds and enclosures used mainly for storage.

== Heritage listing ==
David Fleay Wildlife Park was listed on the Queensland Heritage Register on 23 February 2001 having satisfied the following criteria.

The place is important in demonstrating the evolution or pattern of Queensland's history.

Established in 1951 by world-renowned naturalist Dr David Fleay, forming part of the initial stage of development, the David Fleay Wildlife Park is significant for its contribution to Queensland's history, having a long tradition as a place for breeding and displaying native Australian animals, to draw community attention to Australian wildlife and the need to conserve Australia's native animals.

The place demonstrates rare, uncommon or endangered aspects of Queensland's cultural heritage.

As a type of zoo, which is defined as an enclosure where live animals are kept for public exhibition, the David Fleay Wildlife Park is further significant, as there are few such enclosures found in Queensland. Retaining the enclosure in which the first wedge-tailed eagle was bred in captivity, as well as the platypussary and other breeding and displaying enclosures, the David Fleay Wildlife Park is significant for its rarity and for the high level of intactness of the layout of the original section of the park.

The place is important in demonstrating the principal characteristics of a particular class of cultural places.

The David Fleay Wildlife Park is significant as it provides examples of various types of timber-framed, steel-framed, blockwork structures and enclosures used in the fauna reserves. Of particular significance is the platypussary, the design for which, while modernised, is based on David Fleay's early, pioneering work.

The place has a strong or special association with a particular community or cultural group for social, cultural or spiritual reasons.

The David Fleay Wildlife Park is significant for its association with the many people who have visited, researched and been educated at the Park for nearly fifty years. The Park remains as a valuable asset to the community, where people may see native animals and where community awareness may be raised about the need to protect them, especially rare and threatened species. The David Fleay Wildlife Park combines community education, ecotourism, wildlife conservation and research.

The place has a special association with the life or work of a particular person, group or organisation of importance in Queensland's history.

The David Fleay Wildlife Park is significant for its association with Dr David Fleay, known locally as the "father of conservation". It was during his time at the sanctuary that Fleay bred in captivity the first wedge-tailed eagle. The regard in which he was held by his professional colleagues and the community is illustrated by the awards and honours bestowed upon him during his lifetime.

== See also ==
- Protected areas of Queensland
- Tourism in Australia
