= Birdland Animal Park =

- Interactive map of Birdland Animal Park
- 35.72378°S 150.19407°E
- Date opened: 1971
- Location: 55 Beach Rd, Batemans Bay, New South Wales, Australia
- Land area: 8 acres (3.2 ha)
- No. of species: 60+
- Website: birdlandanimalpark.com.au

Birdland Animal Park was a wildlife park located on the South Coast of New South Wales, Australia. It closed in October 2024.

The wildlife park was situated in a natural bushland setting adjoining Joes Creek, and the park's facilities included an orphanage for rescued animals, up-close interaction with wombats and diamond pythons, walkthrough kangaroo areas and miniature train rides.

== List of animals ==
- Agile wallaby
- Alexandrine parrot
- Alpaca
- Australian green tree frog
- Australian king parrot
- Australian pelican
- Australian boobook owl
- Barbary dove
- Bare-nosed wombat
- Black swan
- Blue peafowl
- Budgerigar
- Bush stone curlew
- Chestnut-eared finch
- Chukar partridge
- Cockatiel
- Common bronzewing
- Cunningham's spiny-tailed skink
- Diamond python
- Domestic goat
- Domestic rabbit
- Eastern bearded dragon
- Eastern blue-tongued lizard
- Eastern grey kangaroo
- Eastern long-necked turtle
- Eastern short-necked turtle
- Eclectus parrot
- Emu
- European fallow deer
- Freshwater catfish
- Galah
- Golden pheasant
- Jacky dragon
- Japanese quail
- King quail
- Koala
- Lace tree goanna
- Laughing kookaburra
- Little corella
- Little pied cormorant
- Long-nosed potoroo
- Major Mitchell's cockatoo
- Masked lapwing
- Masked owl
- Nankeen night heron
- Princess parrot
- Rainbow lorikeet
- Red kangaroo
- Red-rumped parrot
- Red-tailed black cockatoo
- Reeve's pheasant
- Regent parrot
- Ring-necked pheasant
- Rose-ringed parakeet
- Saw-shelled turtle
- Scaly-breasted lorikeet
- Short-beaked echidna
- Southern hairy-nosed wombat
- Spiny leaf insect
- Sulphur-crested cockatoo
- Swamp wallaby
- Tammar wallaby
- Tawny frogmouth
- Wedge-tailed eagle
- White-headed pigeon
- Wonga pigeon
- Yellow canary
