= Central Coast Zoo (Australia) =

Zoo in New South Wales

Central Coast Zoo & The Amazement Farm and Fun Park
- Zoo logo
- Interactive map of Central Coast Zoo & The Amazement Farm and Fun Park
- 33°16′18″S 151°23′23″E
- Date opened: The Amazement Farm & Fun Park opened 2008. Central Coast Zoo opened 2022 to private tours (full public opening possibly in 2026)
- Location: 170 Yarramalong Rd, Wyong Creek, New South Wales
- Land area: 6.1 ha (15 acres)
- Website: www.centralcoastzoo.com.au

Central Coast Zoo and The Amazement Farm & Fun Park are conjoined privately owned zoos located at Wyong Creek, New South Wales, Australia. While the latter has been open for years, the Central Coast Zoo is currently only open to private tours through phone-call or email bookings; however the zoo is expected to formally open officially to public visitation in 2023. Expected to be amongst the most popular animals to visitors are a pride of six (3 female & 3 male) formerly circus-kept African lions.

== Animals ==
=== Central Coast Zoo (VIP encounter bookings only) ===
- African lion
- Aldabra giant tortoise
- American alligator
- Blue-and-gold macaw
- Brown capuchin
- Burmese python
- Capybara
- Caracal
- Common marmoset
- Corn snake
- Duméril's boa
- Elongated tortoise
- Fennec fox
- Green iguana
- Green-winged macaw
- Grey parrot
- Hermann's tortoise
- Leopard tortoise
- Meerkat
- Red-fronted macaw
- Red-handed tamarin
- Red-rumped agouti
- Red-tailed boa
- Rhinoceros iguana
- Scarlet macaw
- Serval
- Veiled chameleon
- Yellow anaconda
- Yellow-headed parrot

=== Amazement Farm & Fun Park (open to general admissions) ===
- Agile wallaby
- Alexandrine parrot
- Barbary sheep
- Blackbuck
- Black swan
- Bourke's parrot
- Canada goose
- Cape Barren goose
- Central bearded dragon
- Coastal carpet python
- Common ringtail possum
- Common wombat
- Crab-eating macaque
- Derbyan parakeet
- Diamond python
- Domestic donkey
- Domestic goat
- Domestic horse
- Domestic sheep
- Dromedary camel
- Eastern grey kangaroo
- Egyptian goose
- Emu
- Fallow deer
- Galah
- Glossy ibis
- Hamadryas baboon
- Koala
- Koi
- Llama
- Meerkat
- Mute swan
- Ostrich
- Paradise shelduck
- Rainbow lorikeet
- Red deer
- Red-tailed black cockatoo
- Rhesus macaque
- Rufous bettong
- Saltwater crocodile
- Short-beaked echidna
- Southern cassowary
- Spectacled flying fox
- Sulphur-crested cockatoo
- Tammar wallaby
- Tawny frogmouth
