= Central Coast Zoo =

There are two zoos named the Central Coast Zoo:

- Central Coast Zoo (Australia)
- Central Coast Zoo (California), formerly the Charles Paddock Zoo
