= Carpet snake =

Carpet snake may refer to:

- Morelia spilota variegata, commonly known as Torresian carpet python, Darwin carpet python or northwestern carpet python, found in New Guinea and Australia
- Pituophis melanoleucus, commonly known as the eastern pine snake, found in southeastern United States
