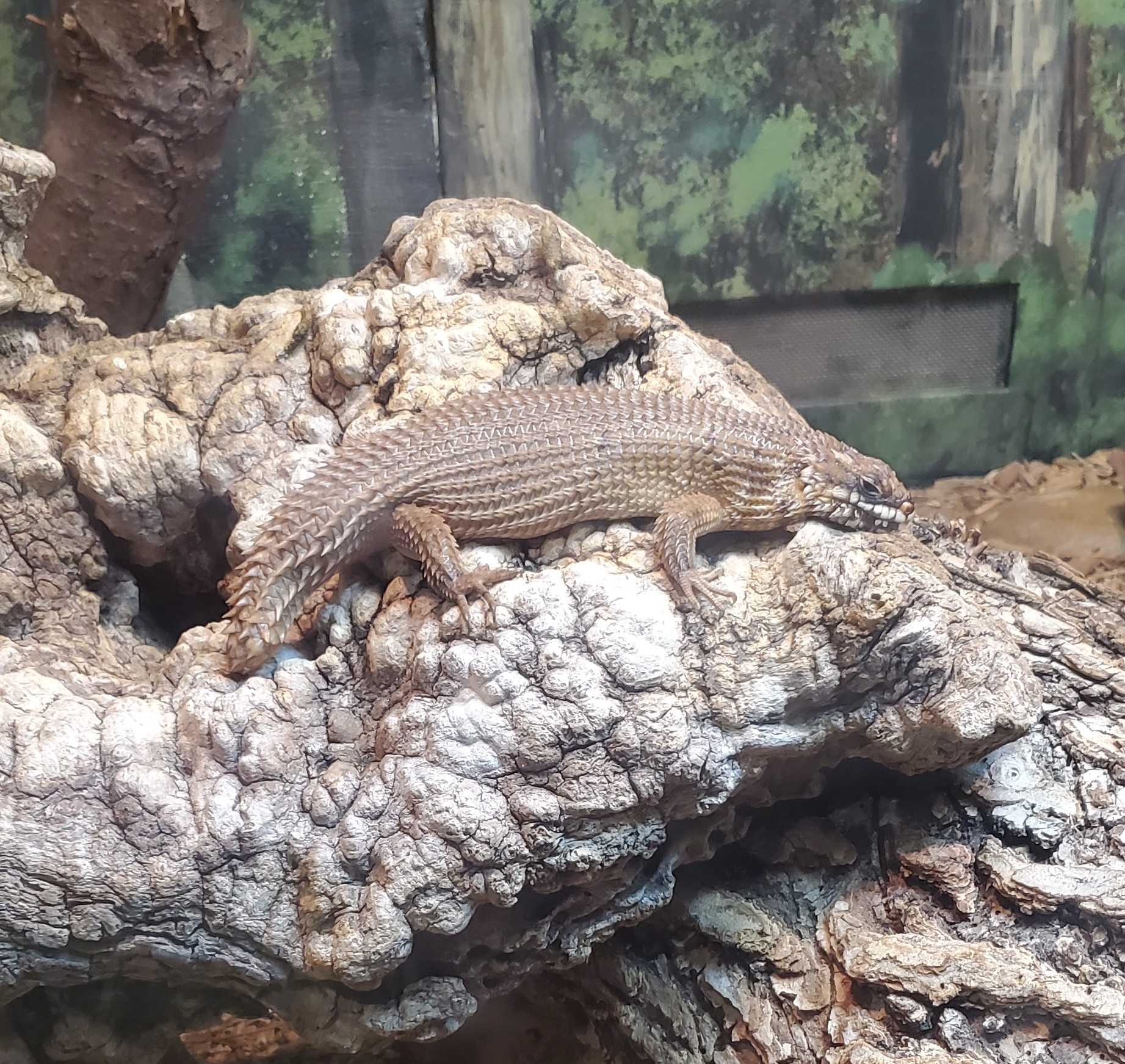
- Hosmer's spiny-tailed skink at Philadelphia Zoo

Conservation status
- Least Concern (IUCN 3.1)

Scientific classification
- Kingdom: Animalia
- Phylum: Chordata
- Class: Reptilia
- Order: Squamata
- Family: Scincidae
- Genus: Egernia
- Species: E. hosmeri

Binomial name
- Egernia hosmeri (Kinghorn, 1955)

= Hosmer's spiny-tailed skink =

Species of lizard

Hosmer's spiny-tailed skink (Egernia hosmeri), also known commonly as Hosmer's egernia and Hosmer's skink, is a species of large skink, a lizard in the family Scincidae. The species is a diurnal, rock-dwelling species native to Northern Australia.

== Etymology ==
The specific name, hosmeri, is in honour of Australian herpetologist William Hosmer.

== Description ==
Hosmer's spiny-tailed skink is mostly reddish-brown on top, with both scattered darker and paler spots along the back, legs, and tail. It has a darker brown head and neck, white abdomen, and a few dark brown blotches under the chin. The snout-to-vent (SVL) is 18 cm (7.1 in), with a round, tapering tail about 60% of the SVL. It is most closely related to Cunningham's spiny-tailed skink (Egernia cunninghami), however the tail of E. hosmeri is flattened and spinier than that of E. cunninghami.

== Geographic range ==
Hosmer's spiny-tailed skin is found throughout dry, rocky regions of Queensland and the Northern Territory.

== Habitat ==
The preferred natural habitat of E. hosmeri is rocky areas.

== Behaviour ==
E. hosmeri is terrestrial.

== Reproduction ==
Like some other reptiles, E. hosmeri is viviparous, giving birth to an average of four live young at a time.

== Diet ==
Hosmer's spiny-tailed skink is omnivorous, eating insects, leaves, shoots, and berries.
