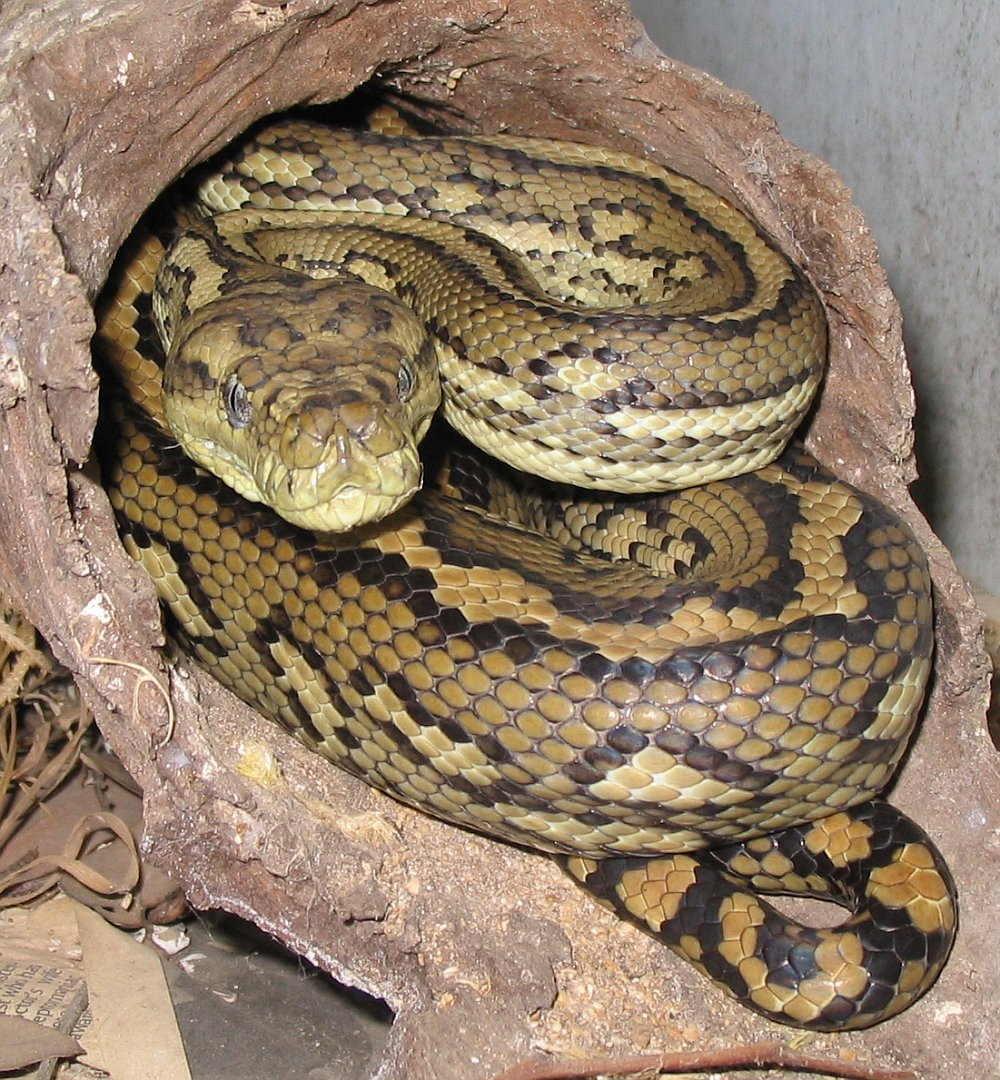

Conservation status
- Least Concern (IUCN 3.1)

Scientific classification
- Kingdom: Animalia
- Phylum: Chordata
- Class: Reptilia
- Order: Squamata
- Suborder: Serpentes
- Family: Pythonidae
- Genus: Morelia
- Species: M. spilota

Binomial name
- Morelia spilota (Lacépède, 1804)

= Morelia spilota =

Carpet python

Species of snake

Morelia spilota, commonly known as the carpet python, is a large snake of the family Pythonidae found in Australia, New Guinea (Indonesia and Papua New Guinea), Bismarck Archipelago, and the northern Solomon Islands. Many subspecies are recognised; ITIS lists six, the Reptile Database six, and the IUCN eight.

== Description ==
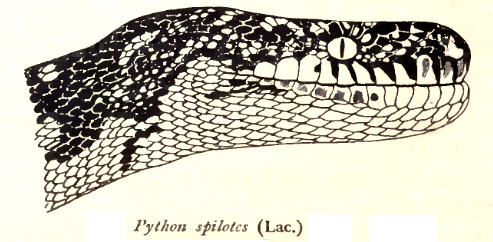
M. s. spilota

M. spilota is a large species of python in the genus, reaching between 2 and 4 m (6.6 and 13.1 ft) in length and weighing up to 15 kg (33 lb). M. s. mcdowelli is the largest subspecies, regularly attaining lengths of 2.7–3.0 m (8.9–9.8 ft). M. s. variegata is the smallest subspecies, typically 120–180 cm (3.9–5.9 ft) in length. The average adult length is roughly 2 m (6.6 ft). However, one 3-year-old captive male M. s. mcdowelli, measured in Ireland, was found to exceed 396 cm (12.99 ft). Males are typically smaller than females; in some regions, females are up to four times heavier. The head is triangular with a conspicuous row of thermoreceptive labial pits.

The colouring of M. spilota is highly variable, ranging from olive to black with white or cream and gold markings. The patterning may be roughly diamond-shaped or have intricate markings made up of light and dark bands on a background of grey or a version of brown.

== Reproduction ==
The species is oviparous, with females laying 10–50 eggs at a time. Afterward, females coil around the eggs to protect them and keep them warm through using muscular contractions to generate heat. This type of maternal care, which is typical for pythons, ceases once the hatchlings have emerged.

== Behaviour ==
Differences in activity are noted throughout various subspecies; as a whole, the species is generally active during both daytime and nighttime, although the subspecies M. s. variegata is noted to be primarily nocturnal. Carpet pythons favor arboreal living conditions, although they can also be found on the ground, and they commonly use open spaces to bask.

=== Seasonal activity ===
In the northern Australian city of Darwin, carpet pythons are significantly more likely to be encountered in suburban areas during the dry season months of May–July. This is indicative of shifts in snake behaviour or movement across the year, with snakes likely moving out of natural forest areas in the later dry season to the more productive suburban areas in search of prey or mates.

== Diet ==
Carpet pythons kill prey by constriction. Their diet consists mainly of small mammals, birds, and lizards. Incidents of carpet pythons devouring domestic cats and small dogs have been reported.

== Distribution and habitat ==
The species is found throughout mainland Australia, with the exception of the arid centre and the western regions. It is widely distributed throughout the forest regions of Southwest Australia. It is also found in Indonesia (southern Western New Guinea in Merauke Regency), Papua New Guinea (southern Western Province, the Port Moresby area of Central Province), and on Yule Island. The type locality given is "Nouvelle-Hollande" [Australia].

It occurs in a wide variety of habitats, from the rainforests of northeastern Queensland (M. s. cheynei) through the River Red Gum/Riverbox woodlands of the Murray and Darling Rivers (M. s. metcalfei), to the arid, treeless islands of the Nuyts Archipelago off the South Australian west coast (M. s. imbricata). It is also found in temperate grasslands with hot and dry weather. It is often found near human habitation, where it performs a useful service by eating rats and other vermin. M. spilota is known to occur in areas that receive snowfall.

== Conservation ==
M. spilota is not threatened as a species. The nominate subspecies, M. s. spilota, is listed as threatened with extinction in Victoria. The subspecies M. s. imbricata is regarded as near threatened in Western Australia, due to loss of habitat.

== Captivity ==
This species is a popular pet among snake enthusiasts. Some forms can be more irascible than others, such as M. s. mcdowelli and M. s. variegata. Forms that tend to be more even tempered include M. s. spilota and M. s. metcalfei. Although they can be nippy as hatchlings, most grow into docile adults. However, care must be taken when feeding, as these snakes have a strong "feeding response" that can be mistaken for aggression.

The care requirements can be generalized for all subspecies. The subspecies M. s. spilota, the cold-weather diamond python, has some separate requirements and habits. As medium to large snakes, carpet pythons need a proportionately sized enclosure that allows for climbing as well as crawling around on the ground. They generally require moderately high basking temperature and moderate humidity. Captive specimens are normally fed live or frozen (defrosted to room temperature) rats or mice, but it is considered best practice to offer a varied diet which includes other types of rodents and birds to create more balanced nutrition. Young carpet pythons can be fed every 1–2 weeks, but adults have slower metabolisms and should be fed every 2–4 weeks depending on body condition.

With proper care, the carpet python is capable of living up to 30 years.

== Subspecies ==
The geographic distribution and common names can be summarised as the following:

Subspecies	Taxon author	Common name	Geographic range
M. s. cheynei Jungle carpet python in shed	Wells & Wellington, 1984	Jungle python; Jungle carpet python	Australia in northeastern Queensland
M. s. mcdowelli Coastal carpet python	Wells & Wellington, 1984	Coastal carpet python; Eastern carpet python; McDowell's carpet python	Australia in eastern Queensland and northeastern New South Wales
M. s. metcalfei Murray-Darling carpet python being handled	Wells & Wellington, 1984	Murray-Darling carpet python; Inland carpet python; Victorian carpet python	Australia in the Murray-Darling Basin of Queensland, New South Wales, Victoria and South Australia
M. s. spilota Diamond python in Lamington National Park, Queensland, Australia	(Lacépède, 1804)	Diamond python	Australia in eastern New South Wales and the extreme east of Victoria
Darwin carpet python Morelia spilota variegata	Gray, 1842	Torresian carpet python; Darwin carpet python; Northwestern carpet python; Irian Jaya carpet python; West Papuan carpet python; Proserpine carpet python; Rubber python	New Guinea (Western New Guinea and Papua New Guinea) and Australia in northwestern Western Australia and in the northern portion of the Northern Territory (specimens from New Guinea are referred to by Hoser (2000) as M. harrisoni, but this is not officially recognized as a separate species or subspecies)

=== Hybrids ===
- Morelia spilota X viridis

== Naming and taxonomy ==
The first description of M. spilota was by Lacépède (1804), who placed it in the genus Coluber as Coluber spilotus. The species has since been described by various authors as containing a number of subspecies and hybrids; these have also been known by various informal names. The attempted arrangement of taxa in this, and other, Australasian Pythonidae has produced numerous synonyms. The discreet and roaming habits of this species have produced a low number of recorded specimens, giving inadequate sample numbers to support descriptions of a taxon's morphology. This is the case with proposed names which are sometimes cited, such as the Papuan Morelia spilota harrisoni (Hoser), despite being unaccepted or invalid. Common names are regional variants of carpet and diamond python or snake.

The following is an incomplete list of synonyms:

- [Coluber] Arges - Linnaeus, 1758
- [Coluber] Argus - Linnaeus, 1766
- Coluber spilotus - Lacépède, 1804
- [Python] punctatus - Merrem, 1820
- [Coluber (Natrix)] Argus - Merrem, 1820
- [Vipera (Echidna)] Spilotes - Merrem, 1820
- Python Peronii - Wagler, 1828
- Python spilotes - Gray In G. Grey, 1841
- Morelia punctata - Gray, 1842
- Morelia argus - A.M.C. Duméril & Bibron, 1844
- Morelia spilotes - Gray, 1849
- M[orelia]. argus var. fasciolata - Jan In Jan & Sordelli, 1864
- Python spilotes - Boulenger, 1893
- [Python spilotes spilotes] - Werner, 1909
- Python spilotes macrospila - Werner, 1909
- Morelia argus - Loveridge, 1934
- Morelia argus - Stull, 1935
- Morelia spilotes spilotes - Worrell, 1961
- Morelia argus argus - Stimson, 1969
- Python spilotes - McDowell, 1975
- [Python spilotus spilotus] - L.A. Smith, 1981
- Morelia spilota - Cogger, Cameron & Cogger, 1983
- Morelia spilota - Underwood & Stimson, 1990
- Morelia spilota spilota - Barker & Barker, 1994
