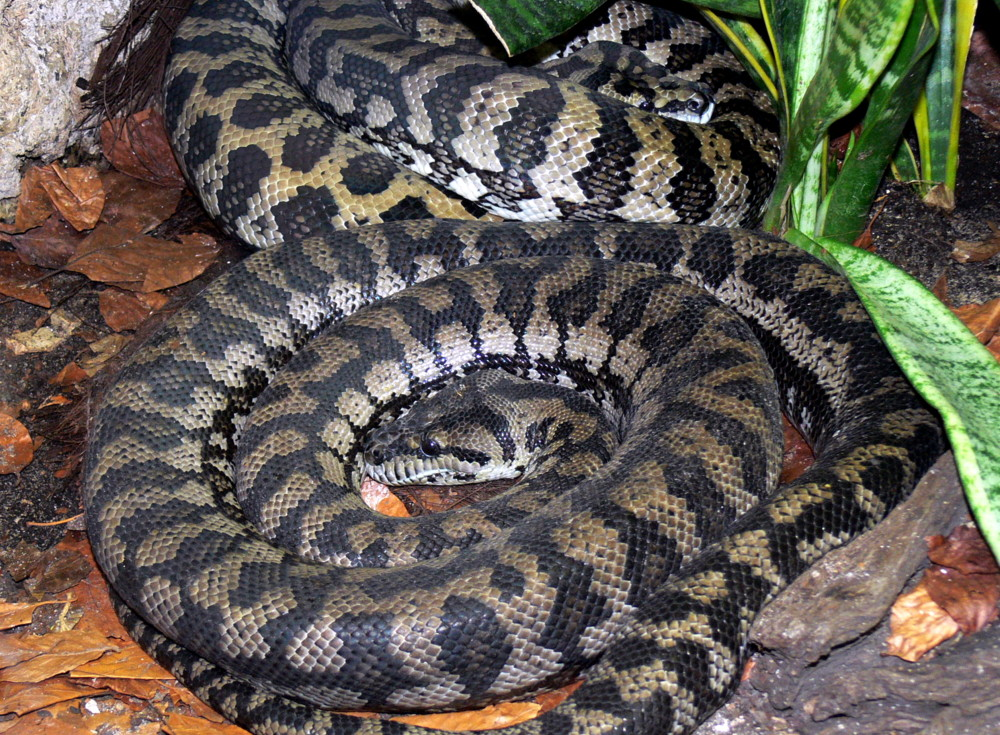

Scientific classification
- Kingdom: Animalia
- Phylum: Chordata
- Class: Reptilia
- Order: Squamata
- Suborder: Serpentes
- Family: Pythonidae
- Genus: Morelia
- Species: M. spilota
- Subspecies: M. s. variegata

Trinomial name
- Morelia spilota variegata Gray, 1842

= Morelia spilota variegata =

Subspecies of snake

Morelia spilota variegata, commonly known as Torresian carpet python, Darwin carpet python or northwestern carpet python, is a subspecies of python found in New Guinea and Australia, smaller than the nominate subspecies Morelia spilota spilota (diamond python) and has a more restricted geographic range.

== Description ==
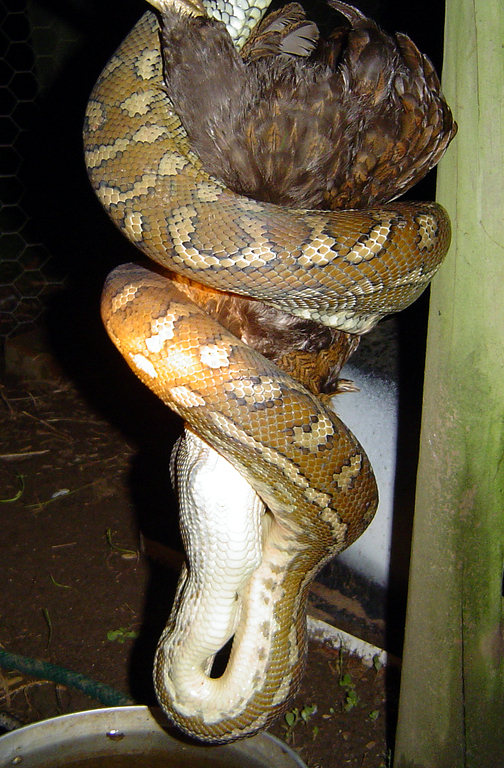
M. s. variegata eating a chicken.

Adults usually grow to no more than 2m, but some have been recorded at 2.5m, and one four-year-old M. s. variegata was recorded at 2.8m.

The colour pattern consists of a beige or brown ground colour overlaid with blackish or grey blotches, cross-bands or stripes, or a combination of any of these. Regional colour variations can include bright yellow, gold, rust and clear greys.

== Naming ==
A number of synonyms refer to this subspecies: Morelia variegata - Gray, 1842; Morelia variegata - Gray, 1849; Morelia argus variegata - Jan & Sordelli, 1864; Morelia argus variegata - Mitchell, 1951; Morelia spilotes variegata - Mitchell, 1955; Morelia argus variegata - Stimson, 1969; Python spilotus variegatus - L.A. Smith, 1981; Morelia variegata - Wells & Wellington, 1984; and * Morelia spilota variegata - Barker & Barker, 1984.

Common names include carpet python, Northwestern carpet python, Irian Jaya carpet python, West Papuan carpet python, Proserpine carpet python.

== Geographic range ==
Found in New Guinea (Western New Guinea and Papua New Guinea) and Australia in northwestern Western Australia and in the northern portion of the Northern Territory. The type locality given is "North Australia: Port Essington" (Northern Territory, Australia).

== Feeding ==
The snake is not venomous and kills prey by constriction. Their diet is varied and includes many different birds and mammals. Populations that inhabit forested areas are mostly arboreal and often feed on brushtail possums.

== Reproduction ==
Oviparous, females deposit their eggs in secluded places such as hollow logs and tree boles where they protect and incubate them. Captive specimens have produced up to 18 eggs that hatch after a 40-day incubation period. The hatchlings are about 12 inches (30 cm) in length.
