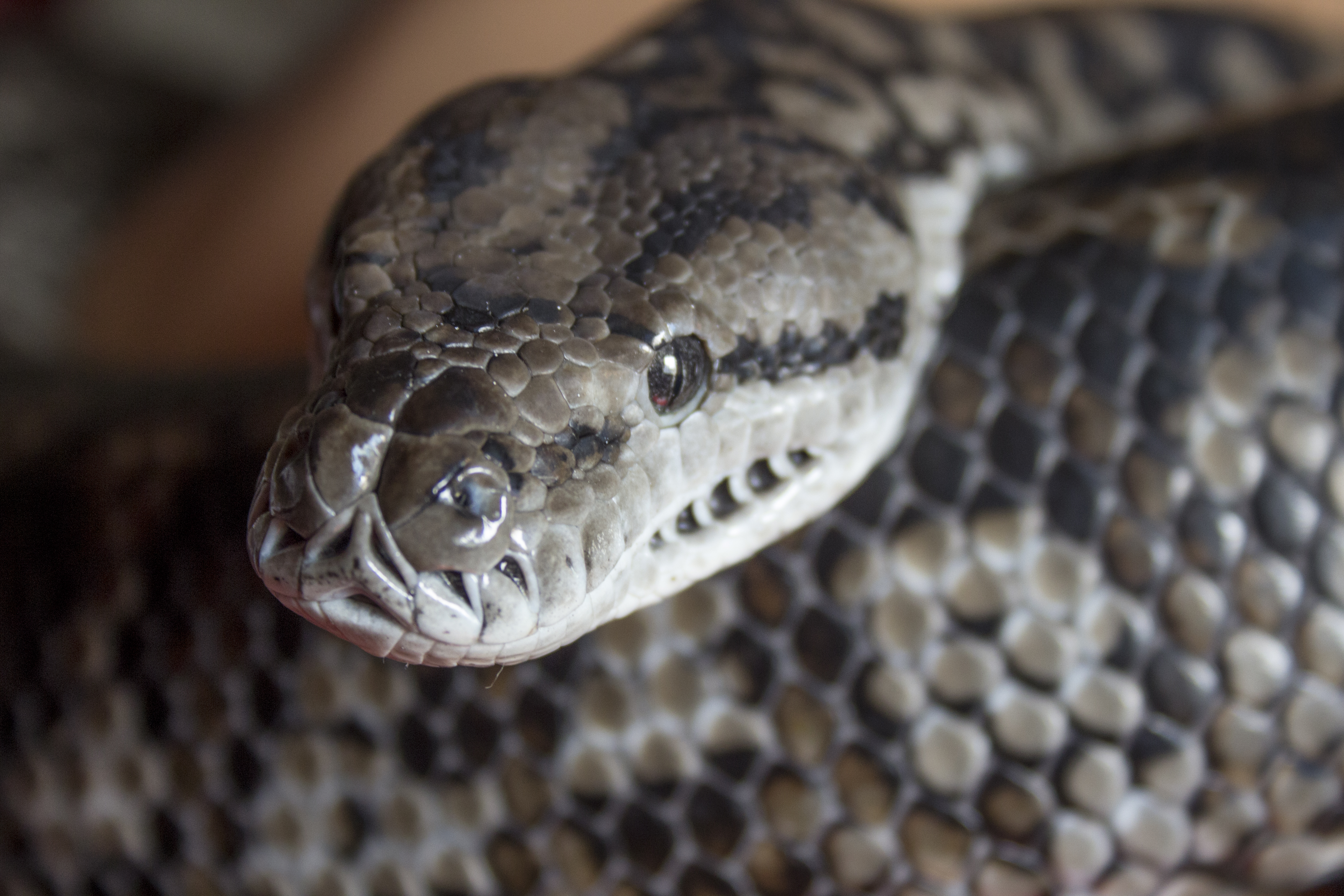

Scientific classification
- Kingdom: Animalia
- Phylum: Chordata
- Class: Reptilia
- Order: Squamata
- Suborder: Serpentes
- Family: Pythonidae
- Genus: Morelia
- Species: M. spilota
- Subspecies: M. s. metcalfei

Trinomial name
- Morelia spilota metcalfei Wells & Wellington, 1984
- Range of M. s. spilota (in red)

Synonyms
- Morelia metcalfei - Wells & Wellington, 1984; Morelia spilota metcalfei - Barker & Barker, 1994

= Morelia spilota metcalfei =

Subspecies of snake

The Morelia spilota metcalfei found in Australia, commonly known as the Murray-Darling carpet python. The pythons are non-venomous snakes that constrict their prey. They grow up to 2.7m (10 feet), but adults are usually around 2.4m (8 feet). Colour varies depending on locality. Victorian Murray-Darlings are silver with solid black blotches and stripes; in New South Wales the silver becomes a light brown and the patterning has more of a black colour; South Australian MDs appear similar to those in New South Wales, though with patches of maroon. These pythons are semi-arboreal, typically inhabiting rocky outcrops, dry woodlands, riverine forests and flood plains. The threats to the snakes are people and other snakes.

== Diet ==
Murray Darling pythons naturally feed on mammals, birds and lizards. In captivity, they are fed mice and rats, and as adults can be fed rabbits, quails and small chickens.

== Geographic range ==
Found in Australia in the Murray-Darling Basin of Queensland, New South Wales, Victoria and South Australia. The type locality given is "Warrum bungle Mountains, New South Wales" [Australia].

== In captivity ==
These pythons are popular as pets due to their mild temperament, although a license and fees are usually required in Australia. As with other carpet python subspecies, both naturally occurring and designer morphs are common in captive specimens, such as albino or reduced pattern varieties.

== Image gallery ==
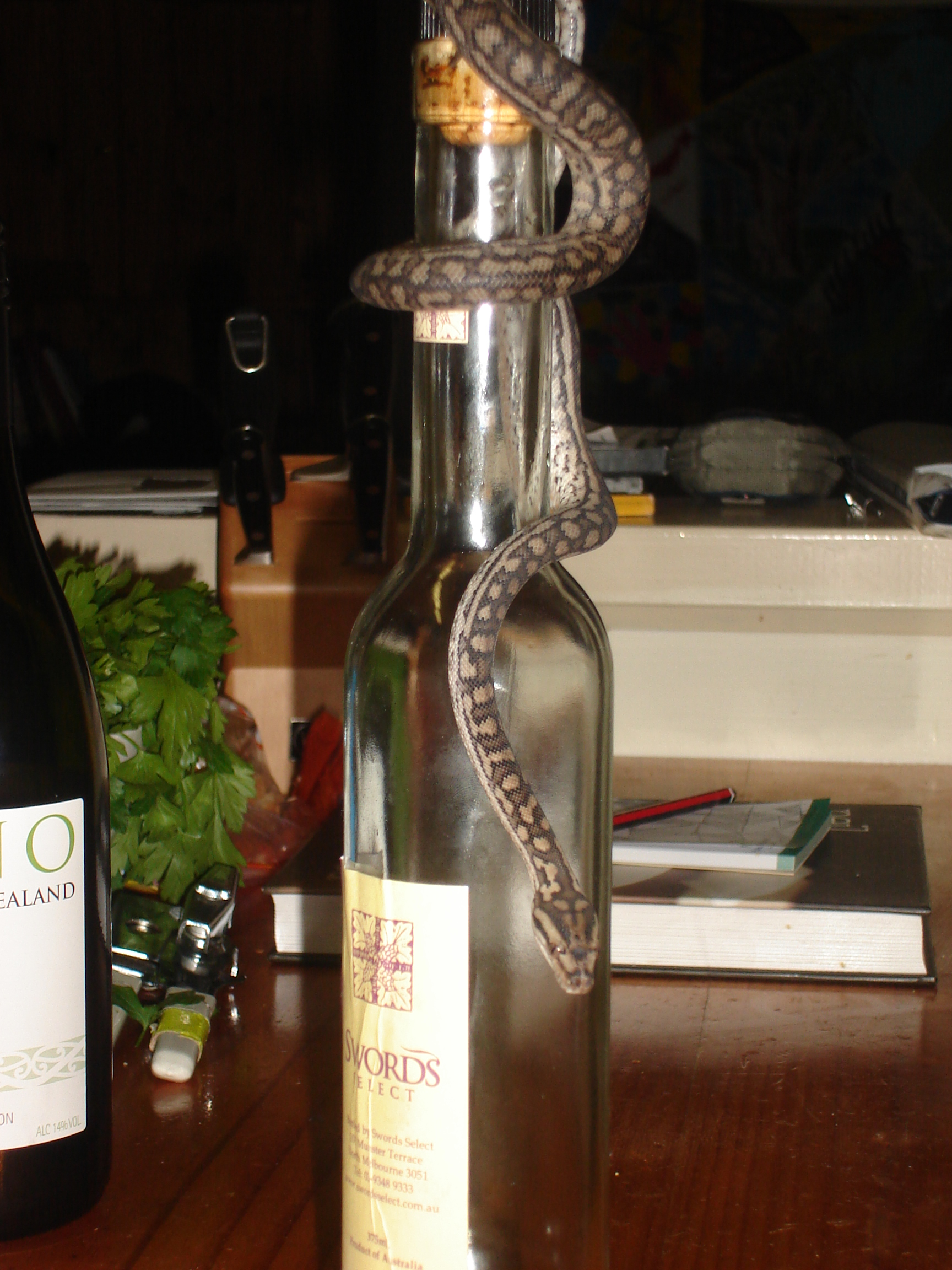
6-month old individual

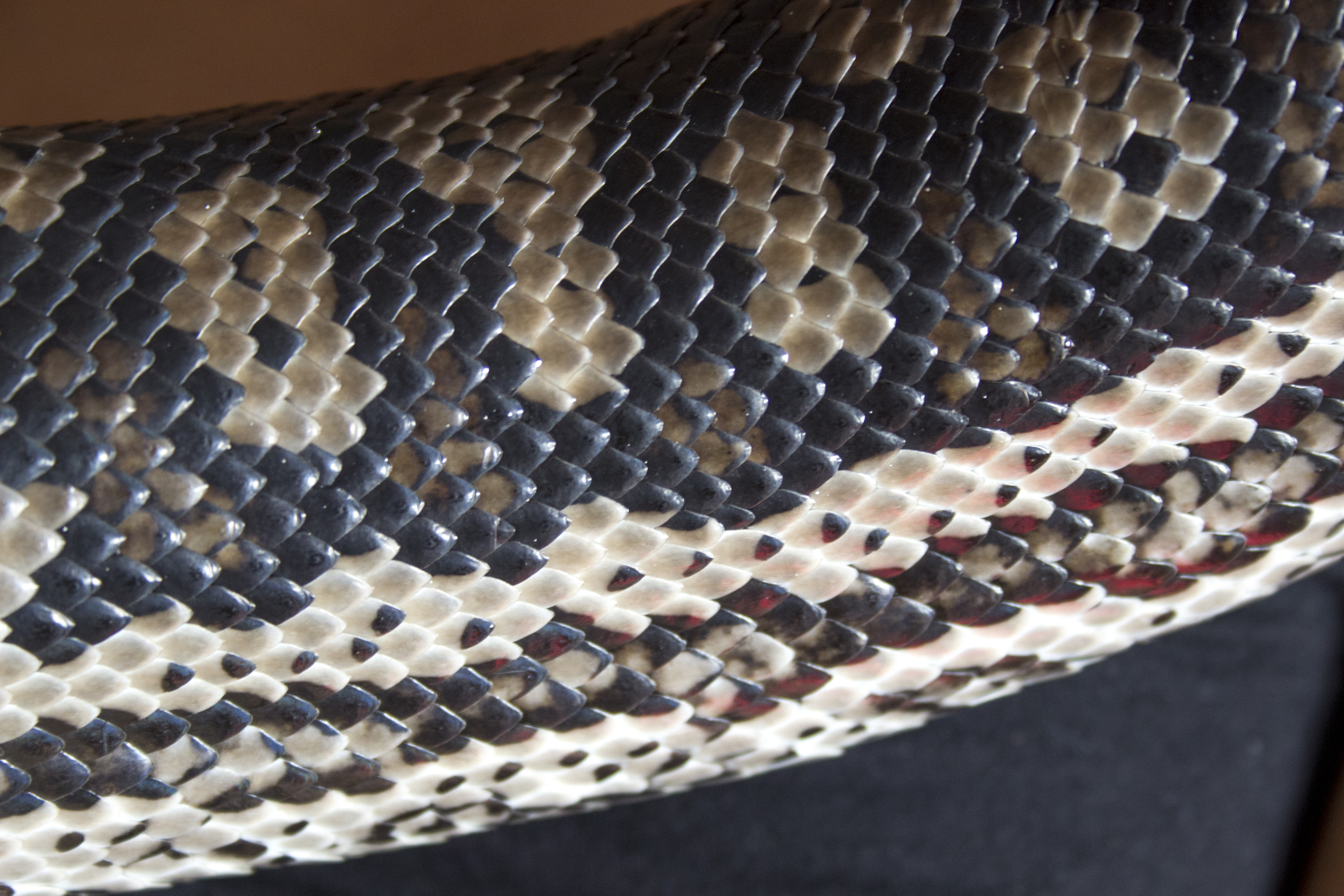
Close up of the scale pattern on an adult male

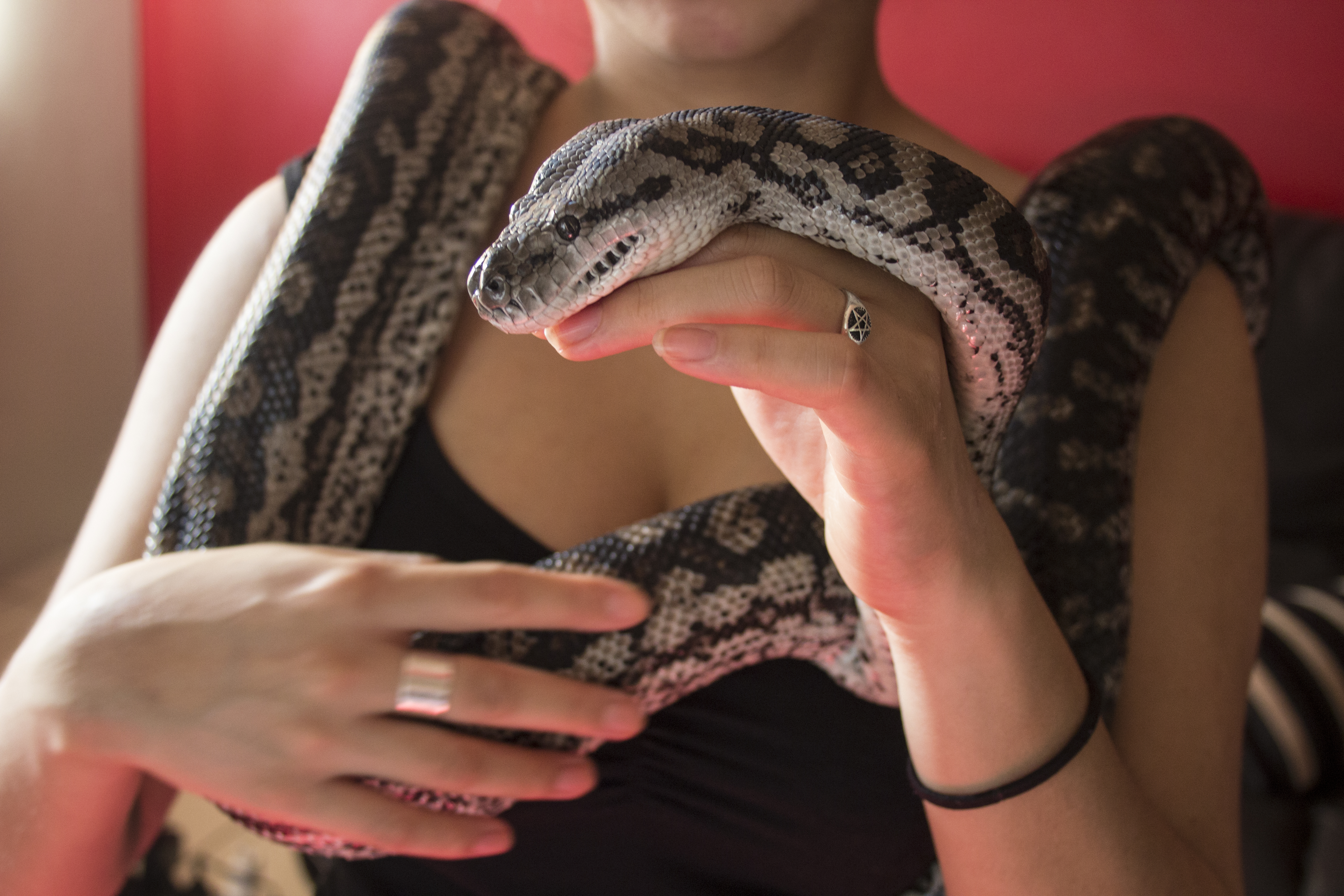
Handling a captive (pet) adult male

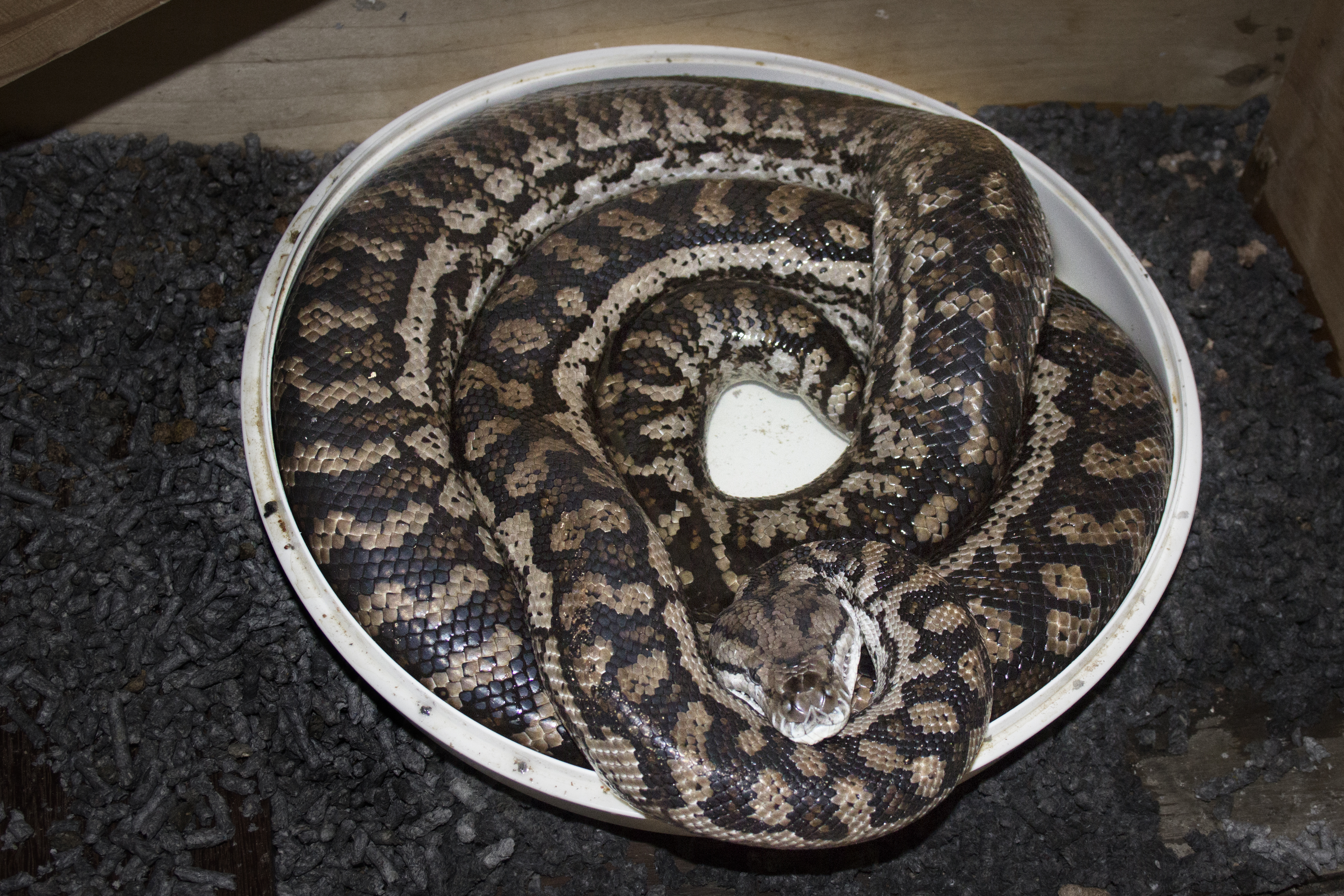
Captive adult male soaking in a water bowl
