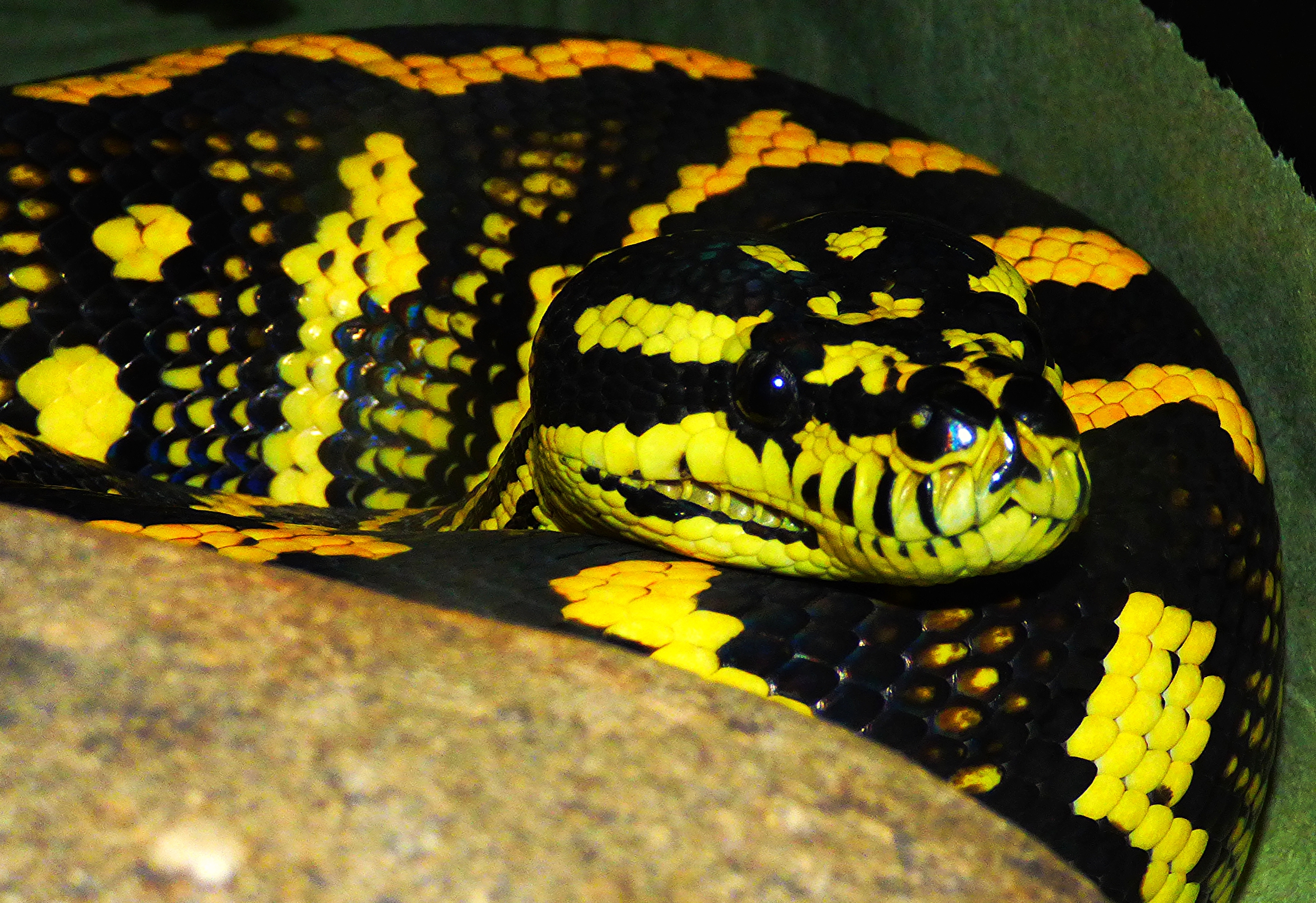

Scientific classification
- Kingdom: Animalia
- Phylum: Chordata
- Class: Reptilia
- Order: Squamata
- Suborder: Serpentes
- Family: Pythonidae
- Genus: Morelia
- Species: M. spilota
- Subspecies: M. s. cheynei

Trinomial name
- Morelia spilota cheynei Wells & Wellington, 1984

Synonyms
- Morelia cheynei Wells & Wellington, 1984; Morelia spilota cheynei — Barker & Barker, 1994

= Morelia spilota cheynei =

Subspecies of snake

Morelia spilota cheynei, or the jungle carpet python, is a python subspecies found in the rainforests of Queensland, Australia.

== Etymology ==
The specific name, cheynei, is in honor of Cheyne Wellington.

== Geographic range ==
The type locality given is "Ravenshoe, on the Atherton Tableland, north Queensland, in Lat. 17° 36' S, Long 145° 29' E" (Australia).

== Size ==
Adults of these medium-sized pythons typically measure 5–7 ft (1.5–2.1 m) in total length. However, wild caught females are known to grow to over 8.5 ft (2.6 m). As with most species of snakes, females are typically larger than males.

== Diet ==
Like all snakes these semiarboreal snakes are strictly carnivorous. They feed on medium-sized rodents such as rats, mice, and baby rabbits in captivity.
