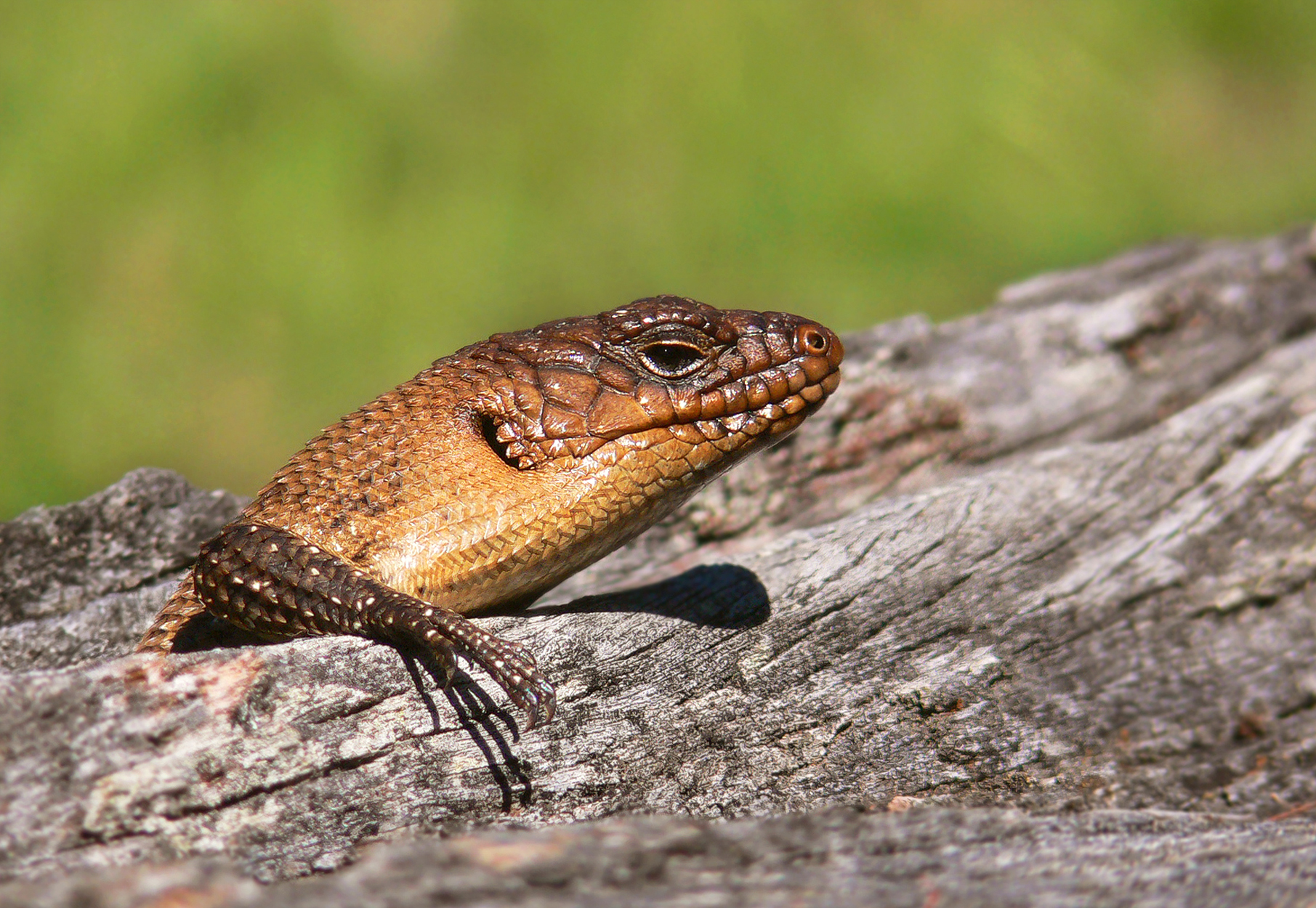
- Cunningham's spiny-tailed skink basking in the sunlight

Conservation status
- Least Concern (IUCN 3.1)

Scientific classification
- Kingdom: Animalia
- Phylum: Chordata
- Class: Reptilia
- Order: Squamata
- Family: Scincidae
- Genus: Egernia
- Species: E. cunninghami

Binomial name
- Egernia cunninghami (Gray, 1832)

Synonyms
- Tiliqua cunninghami Gray, 1832; Egernia krefftii W. Peters, 1871; Egernia lohmanni F. Werner, 1917; Egernia cunninghami — Cogger, 1983

= Cunningham's spiny-tailed skink =

Cunningham's skink

Species of lizard

Cunningham's spiny-tailed skink (Egernia cunninghami), also known commonly as Cunningham's skink, is a species of large skink, a lizard in the family Scincidae. The species is native to southeastern Australia.

== Etymology ==
Both the specific name, cunninghami, and the common names are in honour of English botanist and explorer Allan Cunningham.

== Description ==
E. cunninghami can reach up to 40 cm (16 inches) in total length (including tail), and may be confused with the blue-tongued lizards (genus Tiliqua).

Cunningham's spiny-tailed skink has a distinctive keel on each scale, which gives it a slightly spiny appearance. It is extremely variable in colour, ranging from dark brown to black, with or without blotchy patches, speckles, or narrow bands.

== Habitat ==
E. cunninghami prefers to live communally in the crevices of rocky outcrops or hollow logs.

== Diet ==
Cunningham's spiny-tailed skink is primarily herbivorous.

== Conservation status ==
There is currently research being done on the isolated population of Cunningham's skink that inhabits the southern Mount Lofty Ranges in South Australia. This population is considered vulnerable due to the fragmented (disjunct) distribution of the "colonies". There is evidence that at least one of these colonies has totally disappeared. It is more common within suitable habitat along the southeastern coast and ranges of Australia.

== Reproduction ==
Like some other reptiles, E. cunninghami is viviparous, giving birth to six or more live young in a litter.

== Inbreeding avoidance ==
Habitat fragmentation can affect a species population by disrupting core processes. One such process is inbreeding avoidance (avoiding inbreeding depression). The impact of habitat alteration (deforestation) on inbreeding was studied in the rock-dwelling Australian lizard Egernia cunninghami. Such populations in deforested areas experience potentially inbreeding-enhancing factors such as reduced dispersal and increased relatedness. However, active avoidance of close kin as mates was observed, as indicated by the substantially lower relatedness in actual breeding pairs compared to potential ones expected if there were random mating. This finding, as well as heterozygous excesses in immature lizards from disturbed (as well as undisturbed) habitats indicated that it maintains outbreeding in the face of increased accumulation of relatives.

== Gallery ==
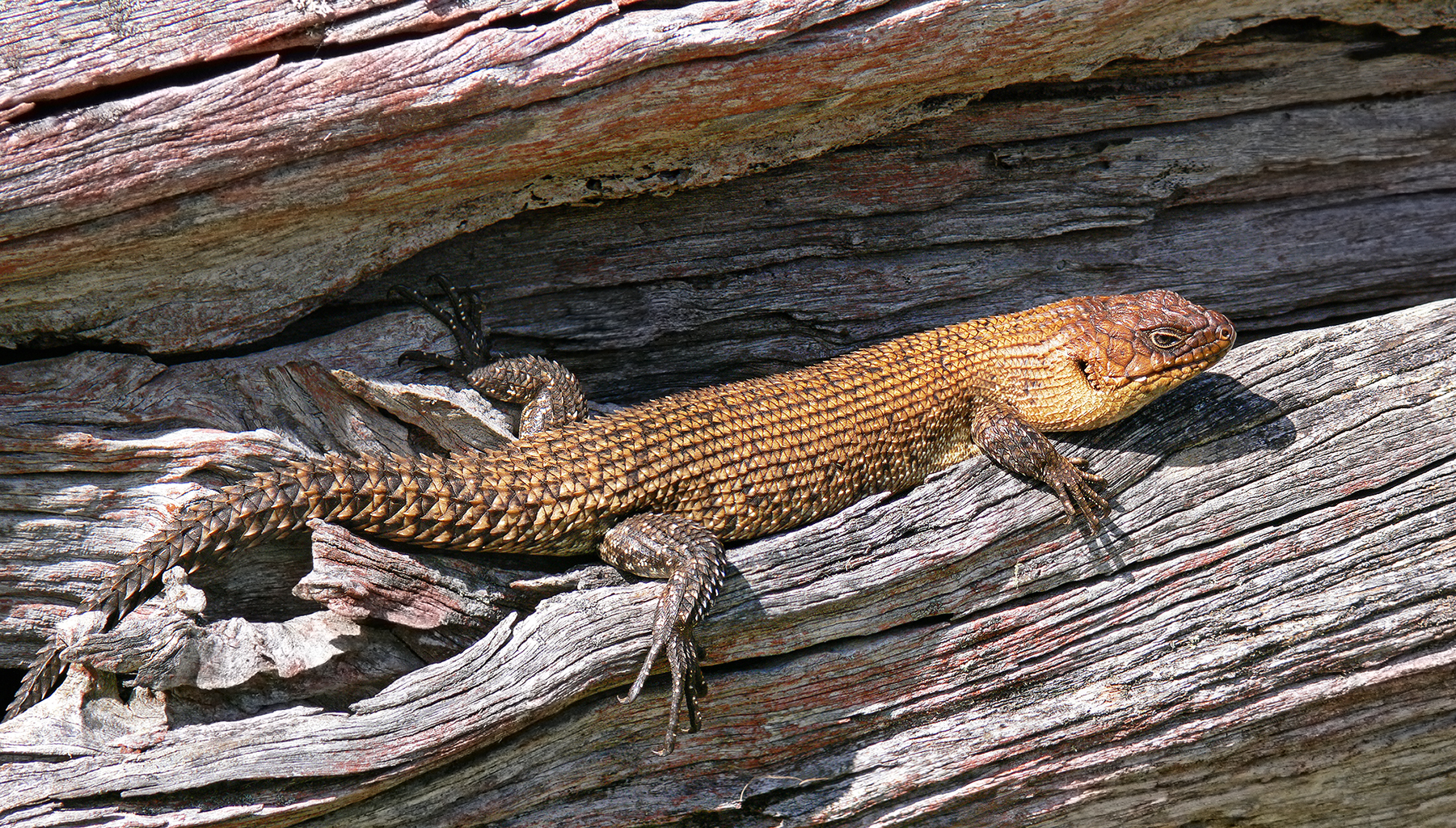
Egernia cunninghami basking on fallen log.

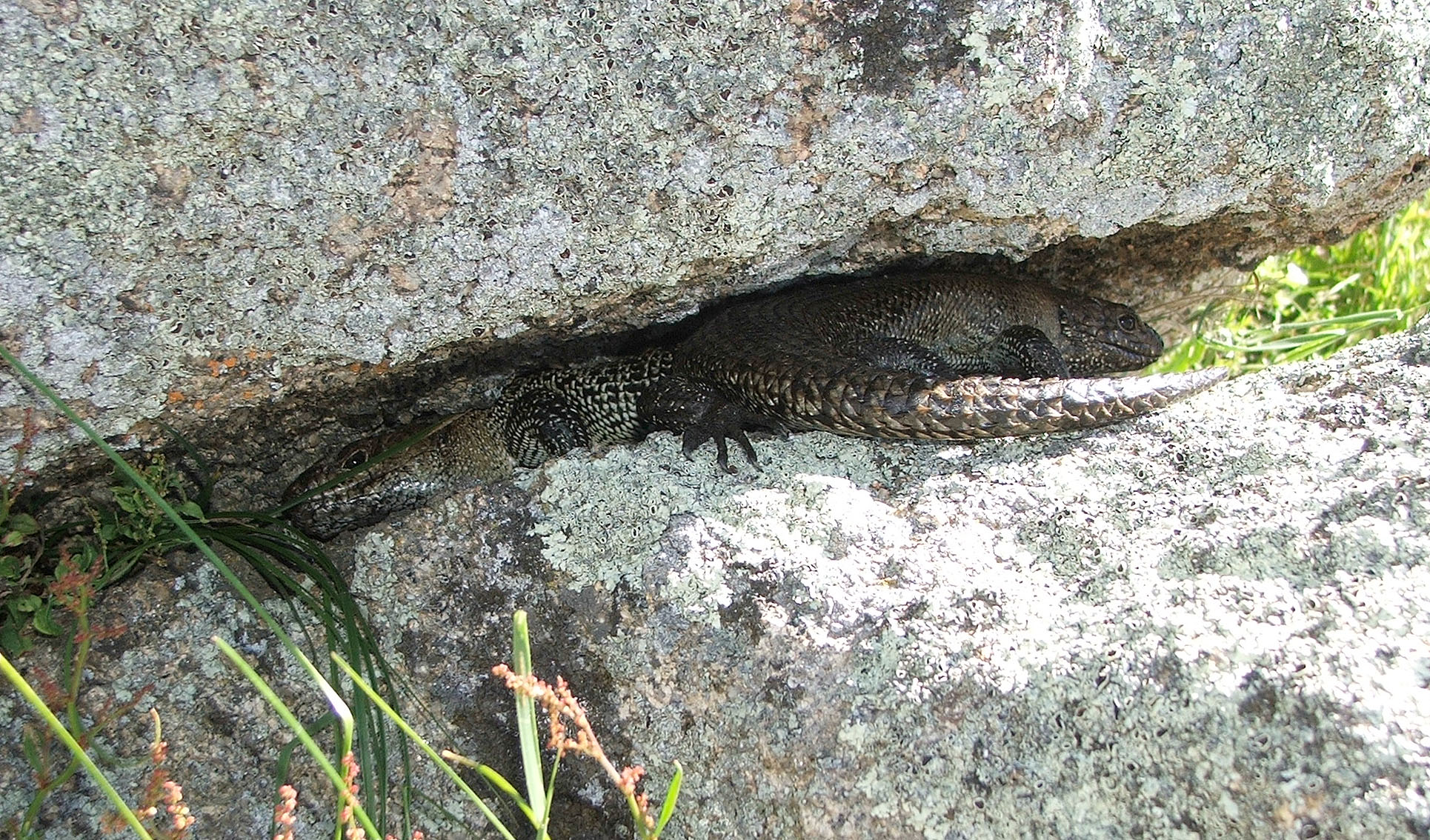
Two Cunningham's spiny-tailed skinks resting on granite boulders, the spiny keel of the scales can be seen on the tail.

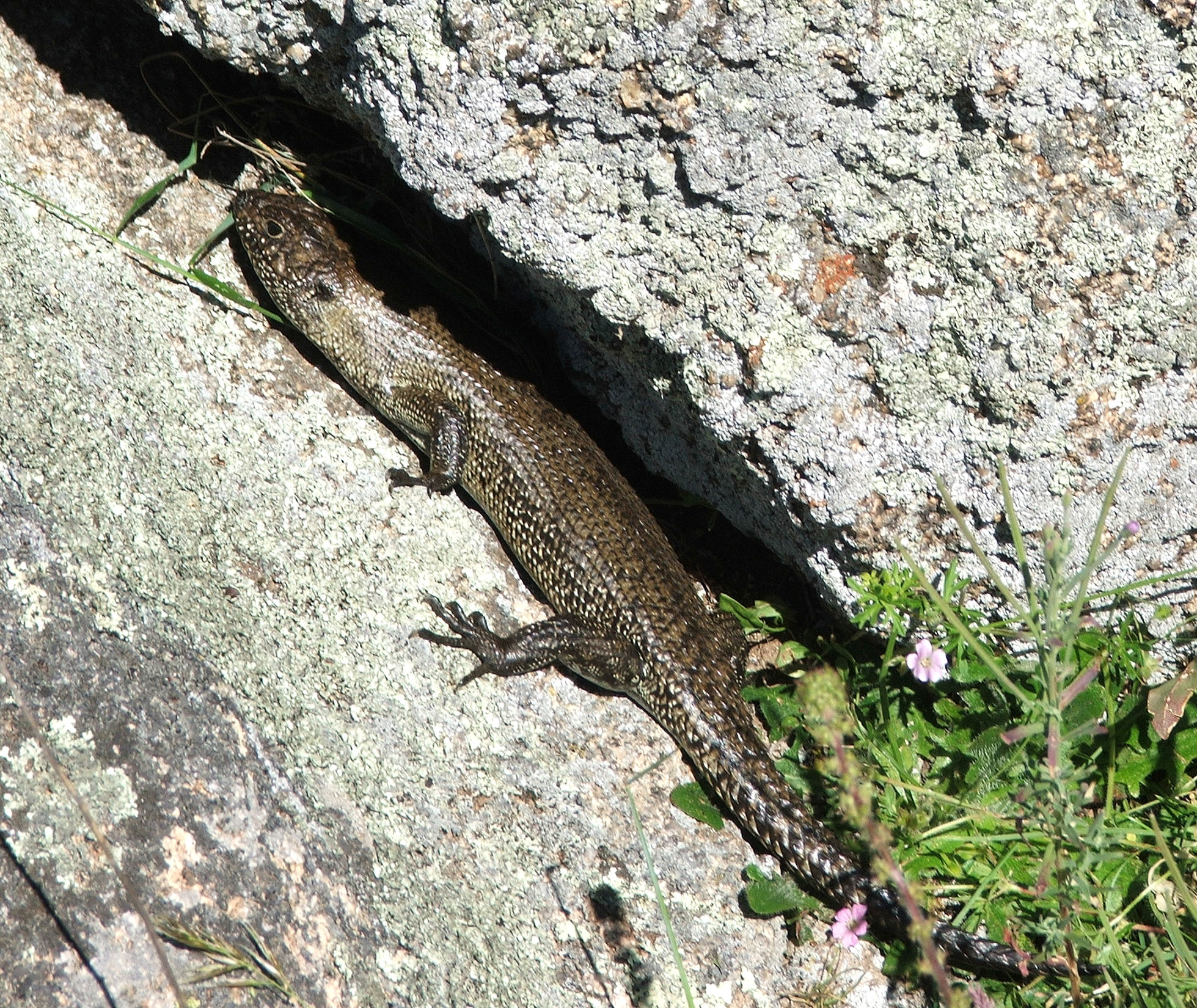
Cunningham's spiny-tailed skink in southern Australian Capital Territory.

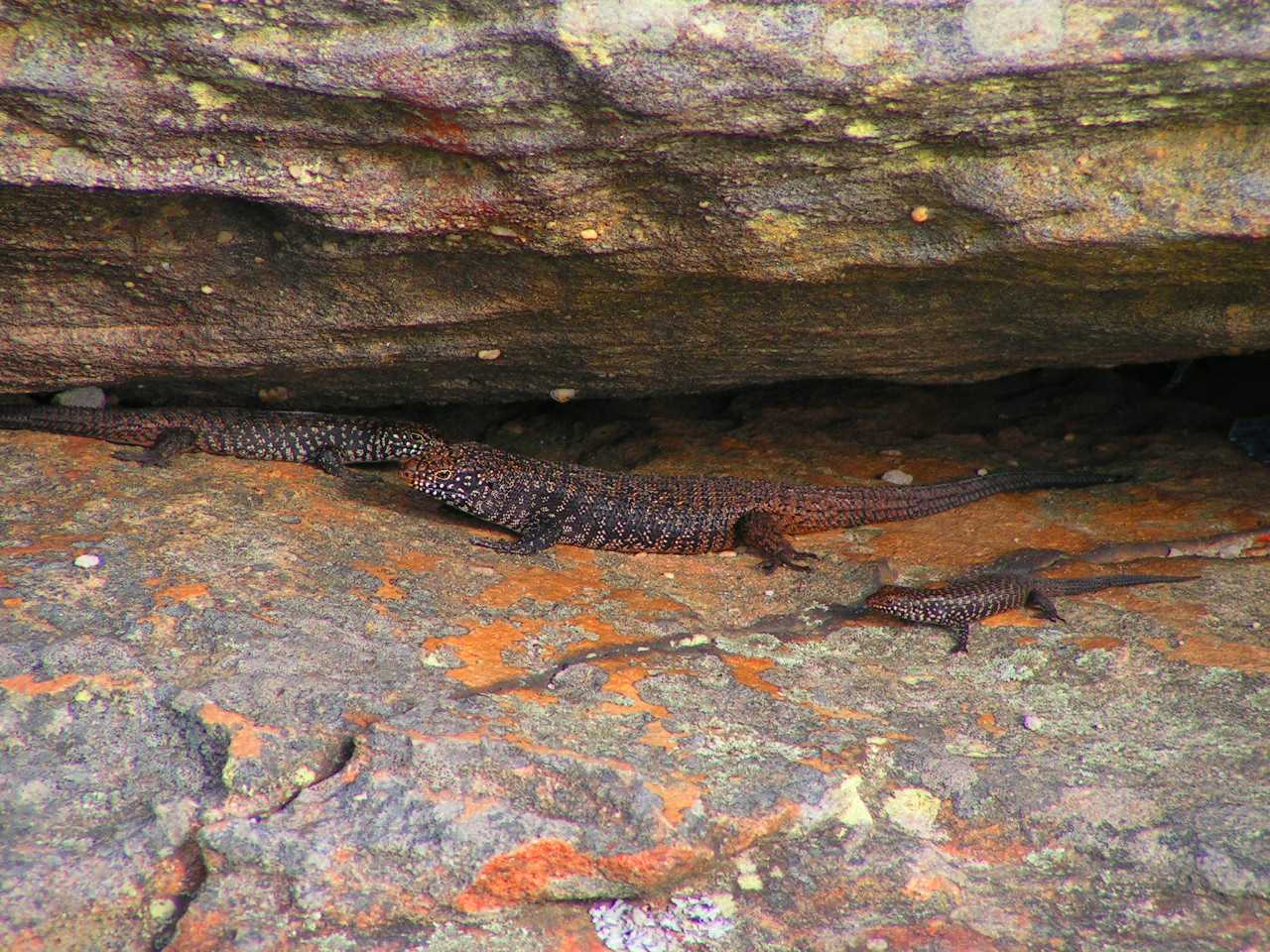
Three E. cunninghami, Cabbage Bay, near Sydney, New South Wales.
