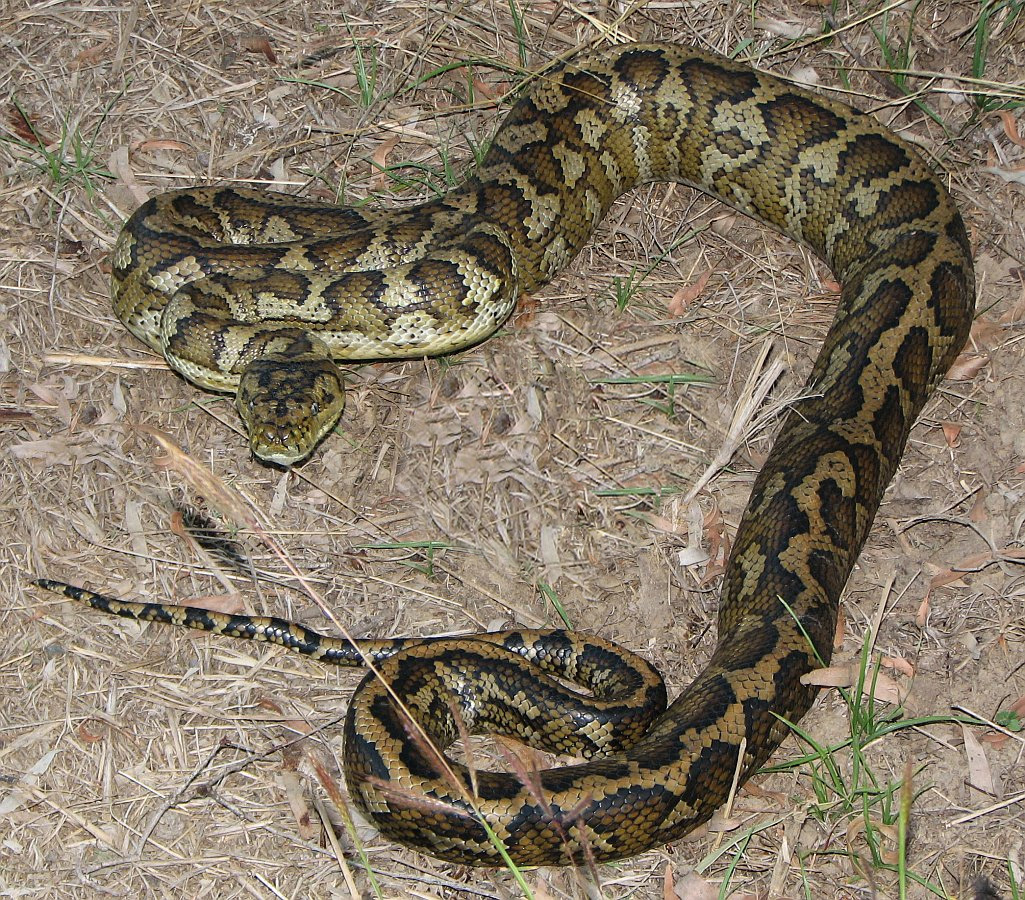

Scientific classification
- Kingdom: Animalia
- Phylum: Chordata
- Class: Reptilia
- Order: Squamata
- Suborder: Serpentes
- Family: Pythonidae
- Genus: Morelia
- Species: M. spilota
- Subspecies: M. s. mcdowelli

Trinomial name
- Morelia spilota mcdowelli Wells & Wellington, 1984

Synonyms
- Morelia mcdowelli - Wells & Wellington, 1984; Morelia spilota mcdowelli - Barker & Barker, 1994

= Morelia spilota mcdowelli =

Coastal carpet python Morelia spilota mcdowelli

Subspecies of snake

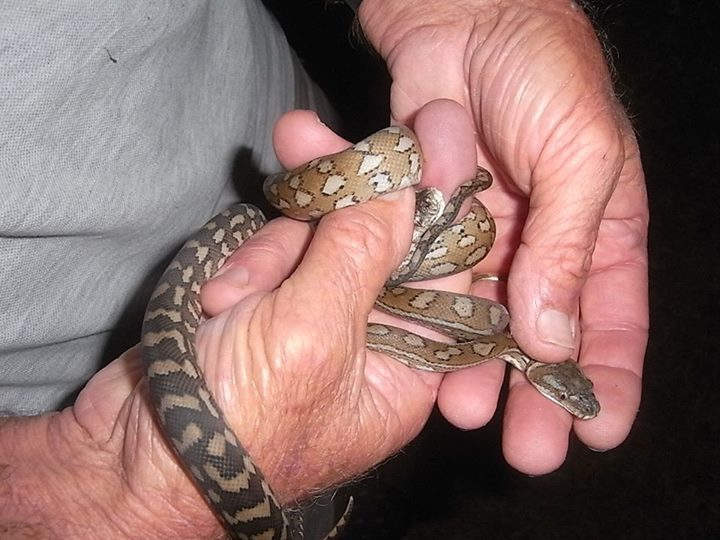
Hatchlings of carpet python on Great Keppel Island

Morelia spilota mcdowelli is a subspecies of Morelia spilota, commonly known as the carpet python, and is informally named the eastern, coastal, or McDowell's carpet python. The original description and name were published by Wells and Wellington in 1984. It occurs along the northeastern coast of Australia and in New Guinea.

== Description ==
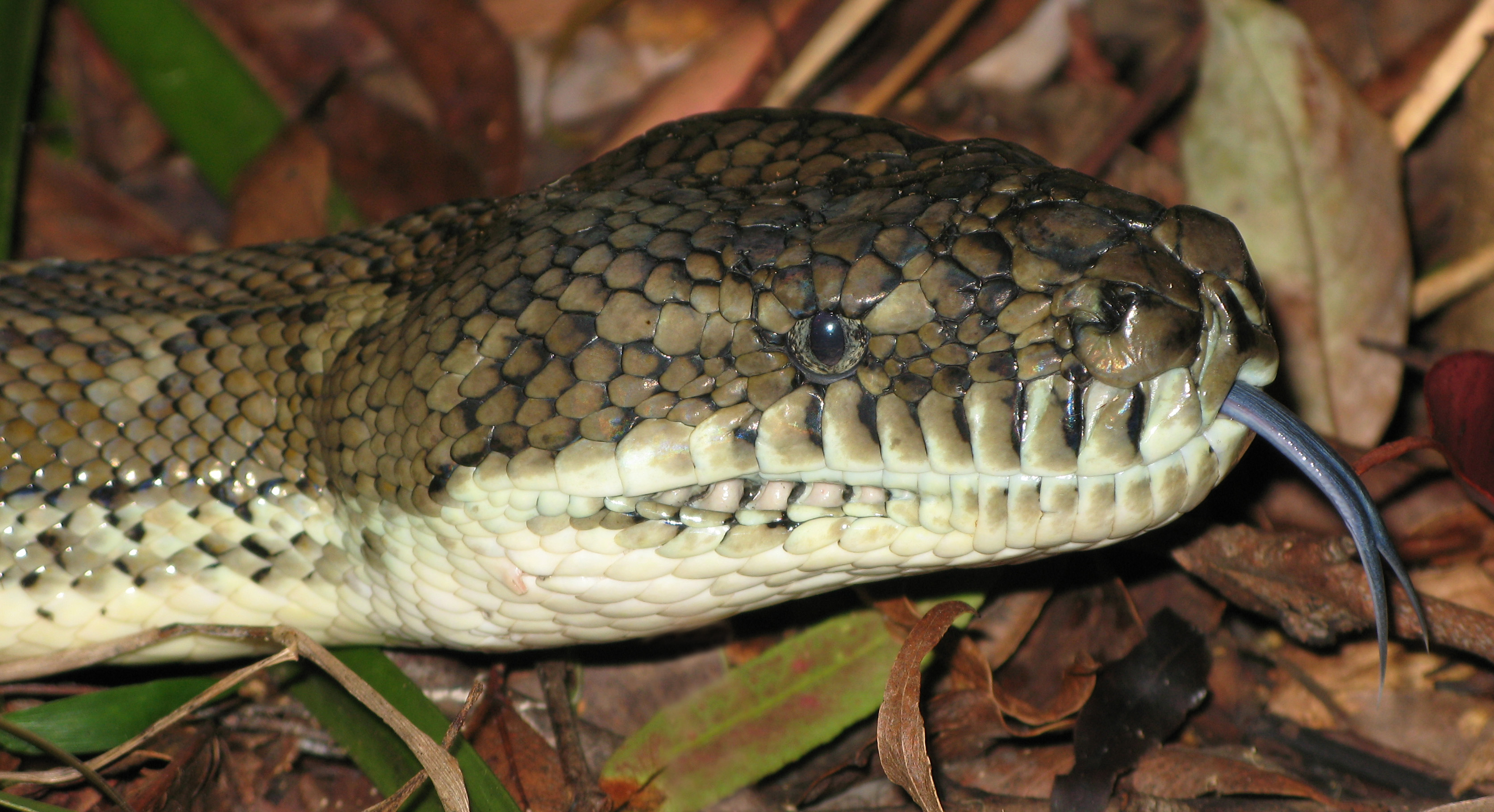
Morelia spilota mcdowelli

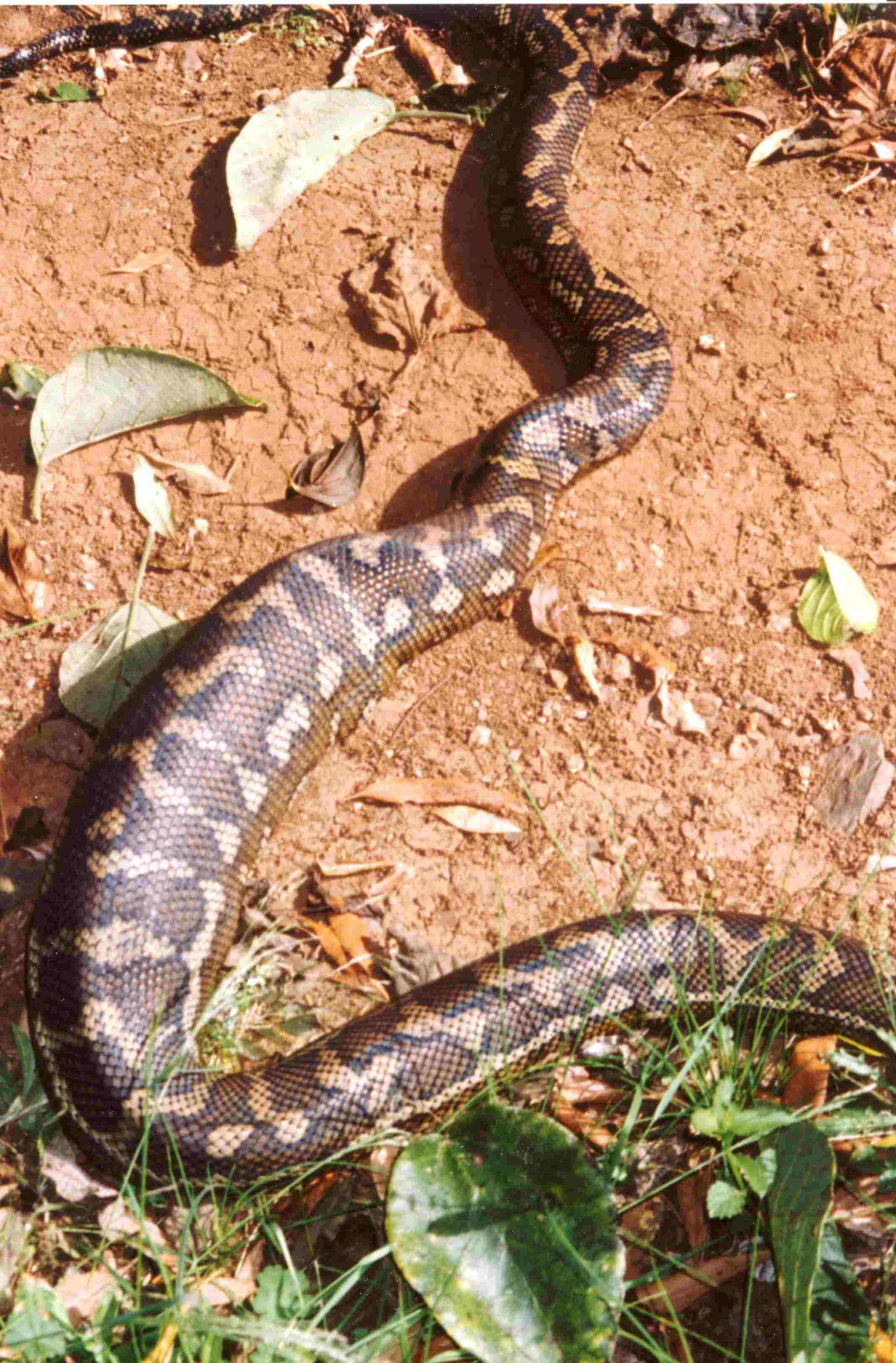
M. s. mcdowelli digesting a meal at Toonumbar National Park, NSW

This subspecies of M. spilota attains lengths of 2.7–3.0 m (9–10 feet). Dorsally, they are generally olive brown to tan in color with paler blotches and stripes, though pattern and colour are highly variable. Midbody scales are in 40-60 rows. They have a single anal scale and their subcaudal scales are divided. Most of the head scales are small, beadlike, and arranged irregularly.

== Habitat and range ==
They are widespread in Australia in eastern Queensland and northeastern New South Wales. The type locality given is "Terania Creek, N.S.W." (New South Wales, Australia). They may be encountered on the ground, draped across boughs of trees, or coiled up in undergrowth. They are frequently found residing in the roofs of houses even in well-settled suburban areas, rainforest, wet or dry eucalypt forest, heathland, pasture, and agricultural and urban areas.

== Notes ==
They are active by day or night (nocturnal and diurnal), feeding mainly on "warm blooded" prey such as possums, rats, flying foxes, and birds, and occasionally poultry, domestic cats, and small dogs. Attempts at eating cane toads are fatal. They sometimes exhibit unpredictable and aggressive behavior. Bites do not result in envenomization, but can cause lacerations. Tetanus protection is recommended.

== Taxonomy ==
The species was placed in synonymy by Underwood and Stimson (1990).

== Eggs and incubation period ==
This large species of python can lay up to 35 eggs, around which the female coils herself, and if the eggs are removed and incubated at 84-86°F, the young emerge after 65-70 days.
