= List of pythonid species and subspecies =

This is a list of all extant genera, species, and subspecies of the snakes of the family Pythonidae, otherwise referred to as pythonids or true pythons. It follows the taxonomy currently provided by ITIS, which is based on the continuing work of Roy McDiarmid and has been updated with additional recently described species.

- Antaresia, Children's pythons
  - Antaresia childreni, Children's python, large-blotched python, eastern large-blotched python or banded rock python
  - Antaresia maculosa, spotted python, small-blotched python, eastern small-blotched python or eastern Children's python
    - Antaresia maculosa maculosa, southern spotted python
    - Antaresia maculosa peninsularis, Cape York spotted python
  - Anteresia papuensis, Papuan spotted python
  - Antaresia perthensis, pygmy python or anthill python
- Apodora, Papuan python
  - Apodora papuana, Papuan python, Irian python or Papuan olive python
- Aspidites, pitless pythons
  - Aspidites melanocephalus, black-headed python
  - Aspidites ramsayi, woma python, woma, Ramsay's python or sand python
- Bothrochilus, Bismarck ringed python
  - Bothrochilus boa, Bismarck ringed python
- Leiopython, white-lipped pythons
  - Leiopython albertisii, D'Albertis' python or northern white-lipped python
  - Leiopython biakensis, Biak white-lipped python
  - Leiopython fredparkeri, Karimui Basin white-lipped python
- Liasis, water pythons
  - Liasis fuscus, water python
  - Liasis mackloti, Macklot's python or freckled python
    - Liasis mackloti dunni, Dunn's python or Dunn's freckled python
    - Liasis mackloti mackloti, Macklot's python or Macklot's freckled python
    - Liasis mackloti savuensis, Savu python or Savu freckled python
  - Liasis olivaceus, olive python
    - Liasis olivaceus barroni, Pilbara olive python
    - Liasis olivaceus olivaceus, common olive python
- Malayopython, reticulated python and Timor python
  - Malayopython reticulatus, reticulated python
    - Malayopython reticulatus jamperanus, Kayaudi reticulated python or Tanahjampean reticulated python
    - Malayopython reticulatus reticulatus, Asiatic reticulated python
    - Malayopython reticulatus saputrai, Selayer reticulated python
  - Malayopython timoriensis, Timor python
- Morelia, tree pythons
  - Morelia azurea, northern green tree python
    - Morelia azurea azurea
    - Morelia azurea pulcher
    - Morelia azurea utaraensis
  - Morelia bredli, Bredl's python, Bredl's carpet python or Centralian python
  - Morelia carinata, rough-scaled python
  - Morelia imbricata, southwestern carpet python
  - Morelia spilota, carpet python or diamond python
    - Morelia spilota cheynei, jungle carpet python
    - Morelia spilota mcdowelli, eastern carpet python, coastal carpet python or McDowell's carpet python
    - Morelia spilota metcalfei, Murray-Darling carpet python, inland carpet python, riverine carpet python or Victorian carpet python
    - Morelia spilota spilota, diamond python
    - Morelia spilota variegata, Torresian carpet python, Darwin carpet python, northwestern carpet python or rubber python
  - Morelia viridis, southern green tree python
- Nyctophilopython, Oenpelli python
  - Nyctophilopython oenpelliensis, Oenpelli python or Oenpelli rock python
- Python, true pythons sensu stricto
  - Python anchietae, Angolan python
  - Python bivittatus, Burmese python
    - Python bivittatus bivittatus, giant Burmese python
    - Python bivittatus progschai, dwarf Burmese python
  - Python breitensteini, Borneo python or Borneo short-tailed python
  - Python brongersmai, blood python or Brongersma's short-tailed python
  - Python curtus, Sumatran short-tailed python
  - Python kyaiktiyo, Myanmar short-tailed python
  - Python molurus, Indian python, Indian rock python, Asian rock python or black-tailed python
  - Python natalensis, Southern African rock python or Natal rock python
  - Python regius, ball python or royal python
  - Python sebae, Central African rock python
- Simalia, amethystine python species complex
  - Simalia amethistina, amethystine python or scrub python
  - Simalia boeleni, Boelen's python or black python
  - Simalia clastolepis, Moluccan python or yellow python
  - Simalia kinghorni, Australian scrub python
  - Simalia nauta, Tanimbar python
  - Simalia tracyae, Halmahera python
