= Scrub python =

Scrub python refers to snakes of the Simalia genus, especially including:

- Amethystine python (Simalia amethistina)
- Australian scrub python (Simalia kinghorni)

According to the IUCN, the term may also sometimes be used for the following related species:

- Simalia tracyae
- Simalia clastolepis
