= Pythonoidea =

Scientific classification
- Kingdom: Animalia
- Phylum: Chordata
- Class: Reptilia
- Order: Squamata
- Suborder: Serpentes
- Infraorder: Alethinophidia
- Superfamily: Pythonoidea

Families
- Pythonidae; Loxocemidae; Xenopeltidae

Superfamily of snakes

The Pythonoidea, also known as pythonoid snakes, are a superfamily of snakes that contains pythons (family Pythonidae) and other closely related python-like snakes (but not boas, which are in a separate superfamily called Booidea). As of 2022, Pythonoidea contains 39 species, including the eponymous genus Python and 10 other genera of pythons (Antaresia, Apodora, Aspidites, Bothrochilus, Leiopython, Liasis, Malayopython, Morelia, Nyctophilopthon and Simalia), all in the family Pythonidae, as well as two lesser-known families, Loxocemidae (one species, the Mexican burrowing python, in the genus Loxocemus) and Xenopeltidae (three species of sunbeam snakes in the genus Xenopeltis).

The taxonomy of pythons, boas, and other henophidian snakes has long been debated, and ultimately the decision whether to assign a particular clade to a particular Linnaean rank (such as a superfamily, family, or subfamily) is arbitrary. The clade name Pythonoidea emphasizes the relatively close evolutionary relationship among these 43 species, which last shared a common ancestor about 62 [CI: 46-78] million years ago, in contrast to the more distant relationship between pythonoids and their next closest relatives, uropeltoids (the most recent common ancestor between pythonoids and uropeltoids lived ~73 [CI:59-87] million years ago).
