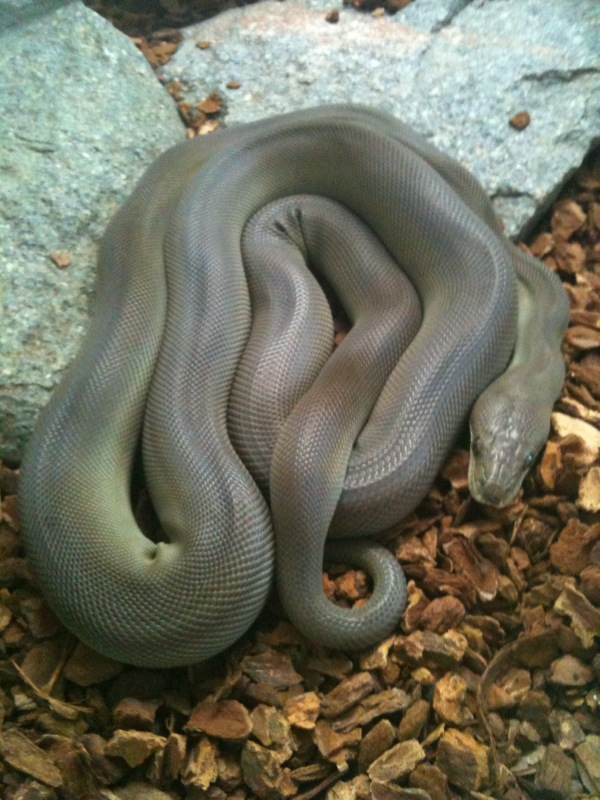

Conservation status
- Least Concern (IUCN 3.1)

Scientific classification
- Kingdom: Animalia
- Phylum: Chordata
- Class: Reptilia
- Order: Squamata
- Suborder: Serpentes
- Family: Pythonidae
- Genus: Liasis
- Species: L. olivaceus

Binomial name
- Liasis olivaceus Gray, 1842
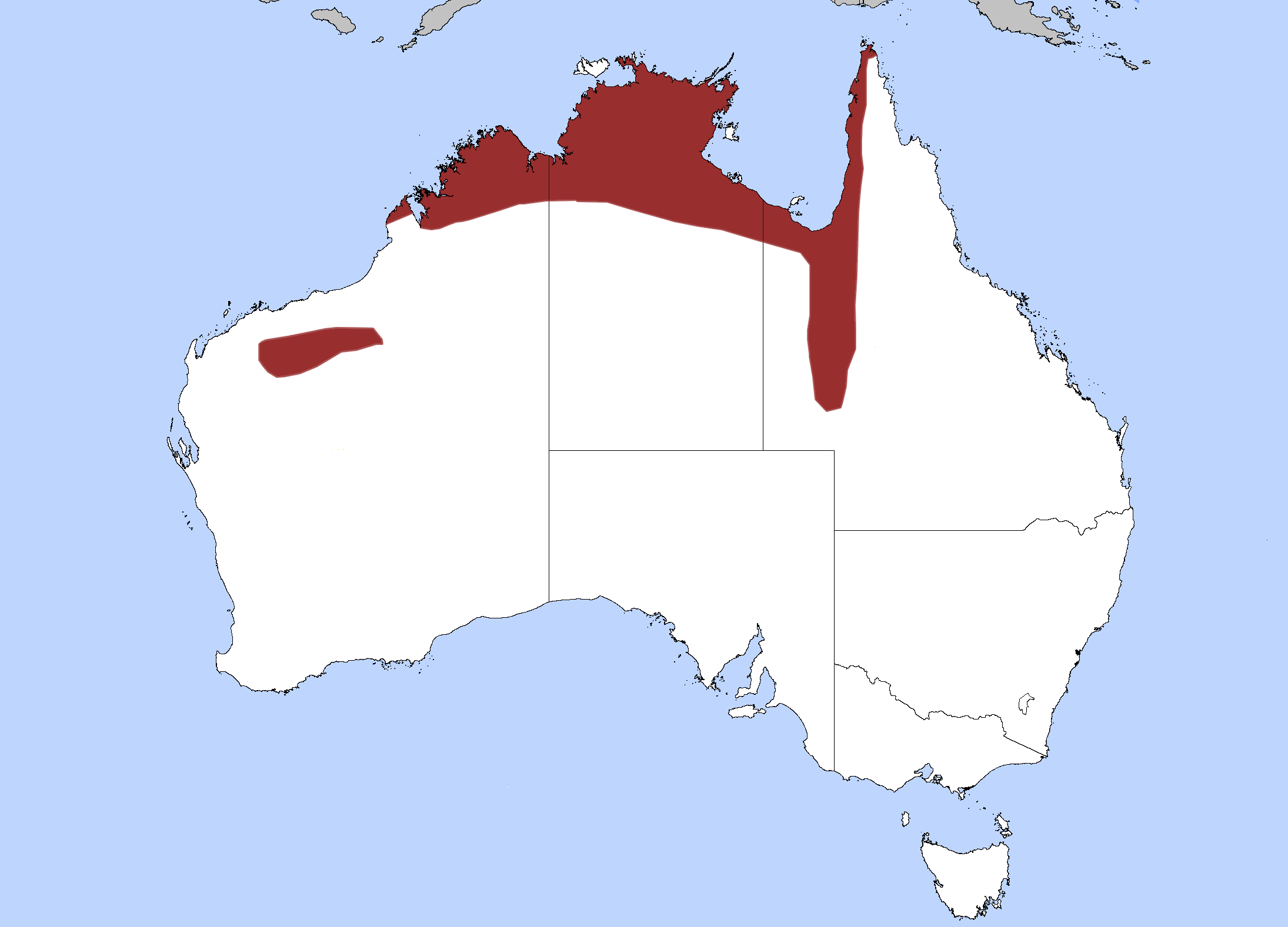
- Distribution of the olive python

Synonyms
- Liasis olivacea Gray, 1842; Liasis olivaceus — A.M.C. Duméril & Bibron, 1842; Liasis olivaceus — Boulenger, 1893; Liasis olivaceus olivaceus — Stull, 1935; Liasi olivaceo — F. Werner, 1936; Bothrochilus olivaceus — H.G. Cogger, Cameron & H.M. Cogger, 1983; Lisalia olivaceus — Wells & Wellington, 1984; Lisalia olivacea — Wells & Wellington, 1985; Morelia olivacea — Underwood & Stimson, 1990; Liasis olivaceus — H.G. Cogger, 1992; Liasis olivaceus olivaceus — D. Barker & T. Barker, 1994

= Olive python =

Species of snake

The olive python (Liasis olivaceus) is a species of snake in the family Pythonidae. The species is endemic to Australia. Two subspecies are recognized, including the nominate subspecies described here.

== Description ==
With adults reaching over 4 m (13 ft) in total length (including the tail), L. olivaceus is Australia's third-largest snake species (surpassed only by the amethystine python and Oenpelli python). Its high number of dorsal scale rows (61–72 at midbody), makes the skin look smoother than that of other pythons. The number of ventral scales is 355–377. The colour pattern is a uniform chocolate brown to olive green, while the belly is usually cream-coloured. The adult weight is typically 10–20 kilograms (22–44 lb), and a large female can exceed 20 kilograms (44 lb) in captivity.

Unfortunately, this species is occasionally confused with the venomous king brown snake, Pseudechis australis, and may be mistakenly killed based on the misidentification.

== Distribution ==
L. olivaceus is found in Western Australia, the Northern Territory, and Queensland. The type locality given is "North Australia; Port Essington" (Northern Territory, Australia).

== Habitat ==
The olive python occurs in rocky areas, gorges, and especially rocky areas near sources of water. Typically, shelter is sought in caves and rock crevices, but individuals have also been found in hollow logs and burrows under rocks.

== Diet ==
The diet of L. olivaceus consists of birds (ducks and spinifex pigeons), mammals (including rock wallabies and fruit bats), and other reptiles. It prefers to lie in wait next to an animal trail to ambush its prey. Alternatively, it is a strong swimmer and also hunts in waterholes, striking at prey from under the water.

It is also known to prey on monitor lizards and juvenile freshwater crocodiles.

== Reproduction ==
Mating activity of olive pythons starts in May and continues until mid-July. When successful, this is followed by a gestation period of 81–85 days, after which the oviparous female lays 12–40 eggs in late spring. The average clutch size is around 19 eggs. The hatchlings emerge after an incubation period around 50 days, each measuring about 35 cm in length.

== Subspecies ==
| Subspecies | Taxon author | Common name | Geographic range |
|---|---|---|---|
| L. o. barroni | L.A. Smith, 1981 | Pilbara olive python | Australia in the Pilbara region of Western Australia |
| L. o. olivaceus | Gray, 1842 | common olive python | Australia from the Kimberley region in Western Australia to the area around Mount Isa in Queensland |

== Captivity ==
The olive python is often kept as a pet and is bred in captivity. It is technically an advanced-level species due to its size, habitat requirements, and strong feeding response, requiring a terrarium of a minimum of 2.4 metres (8 ft) long, by 1 metre (3 ft) high and 1 metre (3 ft) wide. If raised properly, it is noted to be friendly, curious, and calm. In removing it from its enclosure, snake hooks be used so as to prevent the feeding response from being triggered, and once out, it can generally be freely handled calmly due to its placid nature.

== Images ==
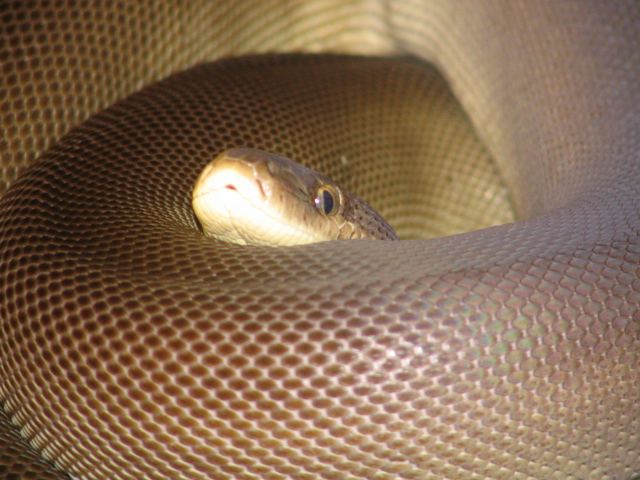
Close-up of head and scales
