= David G. Barker =

American herpetologist

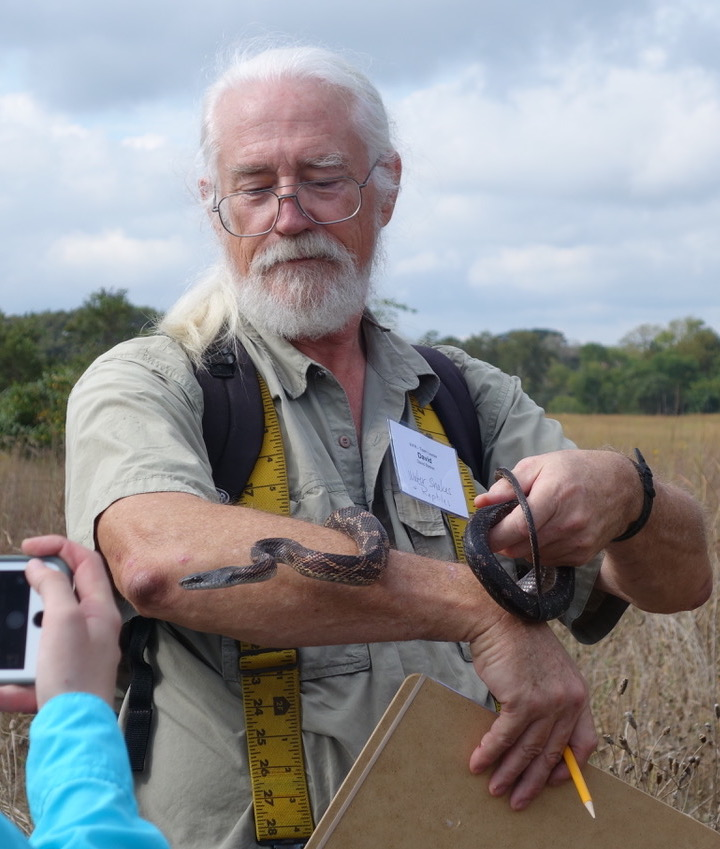
David G. Barker examining a Pantherophis in 2015

David G. Barker (born January 6, 1952) is an American herpetologist specialized in pythons and rattlesnakes.

Barker graduated in biology at the University of Texas at Arlington, where he additionally served as an instructor in the Department of Biology, and as a preparator in the Museum of Herpetology. From 1975 to 1984 he worked at the Dallas Zoo as its public lecturer and as supervisor in the Reptile House and Children's Zoo. In 1988 he became Curator of Education at the Gladys Porter Zoo. In 1990 he and his wife, biologist Tracy M. Barker, founded Vida Preciosa International, Inc [VPI], an enterprise dedicated to the research necessary to establish self-sustaining captive populations of pythons and boas. This facility became one of the largest and most diverse collection of pythons in the world; in 1997, the Barkers and their work at VPI were featured in a National Geographic Television documentary titled “Passion for Pythons”. They managed to reproduce 32 of the 52 recognized taxa of pythons. Among them, the first ever reproduction of 12 taxa.

Next to extensive studies on reptiles in captivity, Barker did field work in the United States, Mexico, Indonesia and Australia. His main areas of research are systematics, taxonomy, natural history, animal behavior, morphology, reproductive physiology, captive breeding and animal and plant conservation.

In 1998 he co-authored the description of a new species of monitor lizard: Varanus yuwonoi and in 2000 the description of three new species of pythons: Morelia clastolepis, Morelia nauta and Morelia tracyae. The later is named in honor of his wife Tracy.

Through 2011, Barker has written several dozen scientific publications, seven books, over 70 popular articles and has published more than 500 images of reptiles in books, journals and periodicals. From 1990 through 1993 he additionally served on the editorial board of the magazine Zoo Life. In 1989, Barker was awarded Grand Prize in Sierra Club's 10th Annual Photo Contest. One of his books, Pythons of the World, Volume 2: Ball Pythons, was certified as “The Best Animal Book of 2006” by the Independent Publisher Book Awards.

He also gave hundreds of educational reptile demonstrations and appeared in 1988 on Johnny Carson's Tonight Show. In 2011, Barker testified to the United States congressional committee on Government Oversight and Reform on the issues of restrictive regulations and governmental interference imposed on small business.

Barker is a member of the Boa and Python Specialist Group of the International Union for the Conservation of Nature [IUCN].

== Books ==
- An Introduction to Moths and Mothing, Featuring The Moths of the Devils River. VPI Library, Boerne, Texas, 2023. 244 pp.
- Pythons of the World, Volume 3: The Pythons of Asia and the Malay Archipelago. with Tracy M. Barker and Mark Auliya. VPI Library, Boerne, Texas, 2018. 371 pp.
- The Invisible Ark – In Defense of Captivity. with Tracy M. Barker. VPI Library, Boerne, Texas, 2014. 169 pp.
- Pythons of the World, Volume 2: Ball Pythons: The History, Natural History, Care and Breeding. with Tracy M. Barker. VPI Library, Boerne, Texas, 2006. 321pp.
- Pythons of the World, Volume 1, Australia. with Tracy M. Barker. The Herpetocultural Library, Advanced Vivarium Systems, Lakeside, California, 1994. 171 pp.
- The Ball Python Manual. with Philippe de Vosjoli, Roger Klingenberg and Tracy M. Barker. The Herpetocultural Library, Advanced Vivarium Systems, Lakeside, California, 1994. 76 pp.
- A Field Guide to the Reptiles and Amphibians of Texas. with Judith Garrett, Texas Monthly Press, Austin, Texas, 1987. 225 pp.
