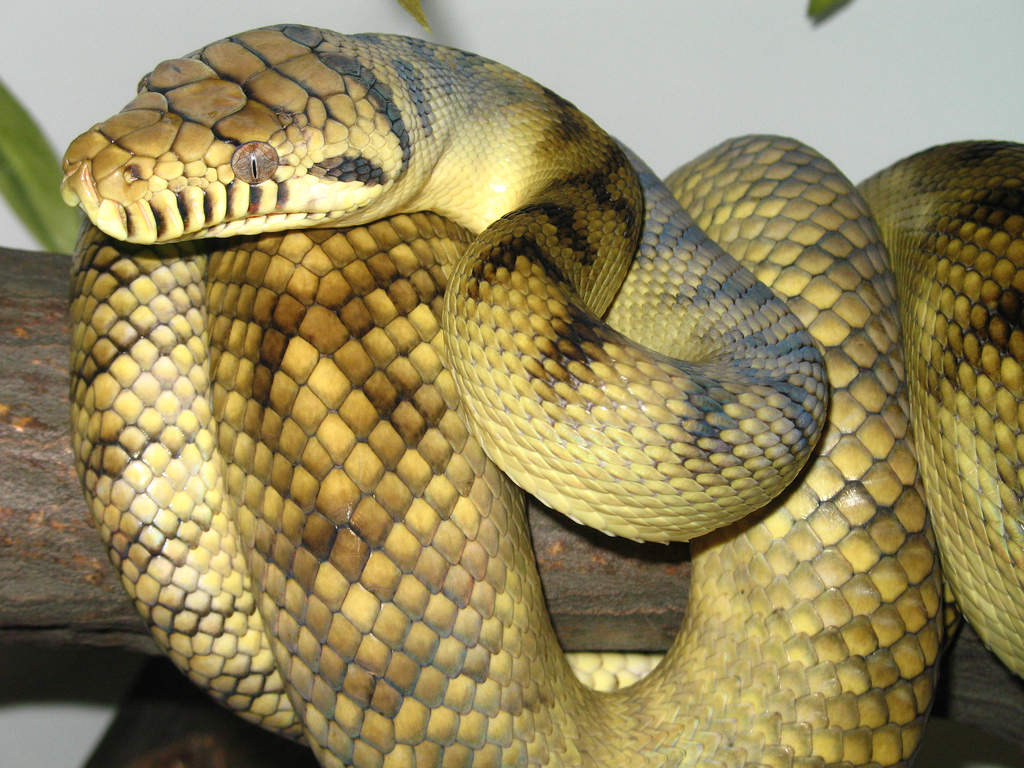

Conservation status
- Least Concern (IUCN 3.1)

Scientific classification
- Kingdom: Animalia
- Phylum: Chordata
- Class: Reptilia
- Order: Squamata
- Suborder: Serpentes
- Family: Pythonidae
- Genus: Simalia
- Species: S. amethistina

Binomial name
- Simalia amethistina (Schneider, 1801)
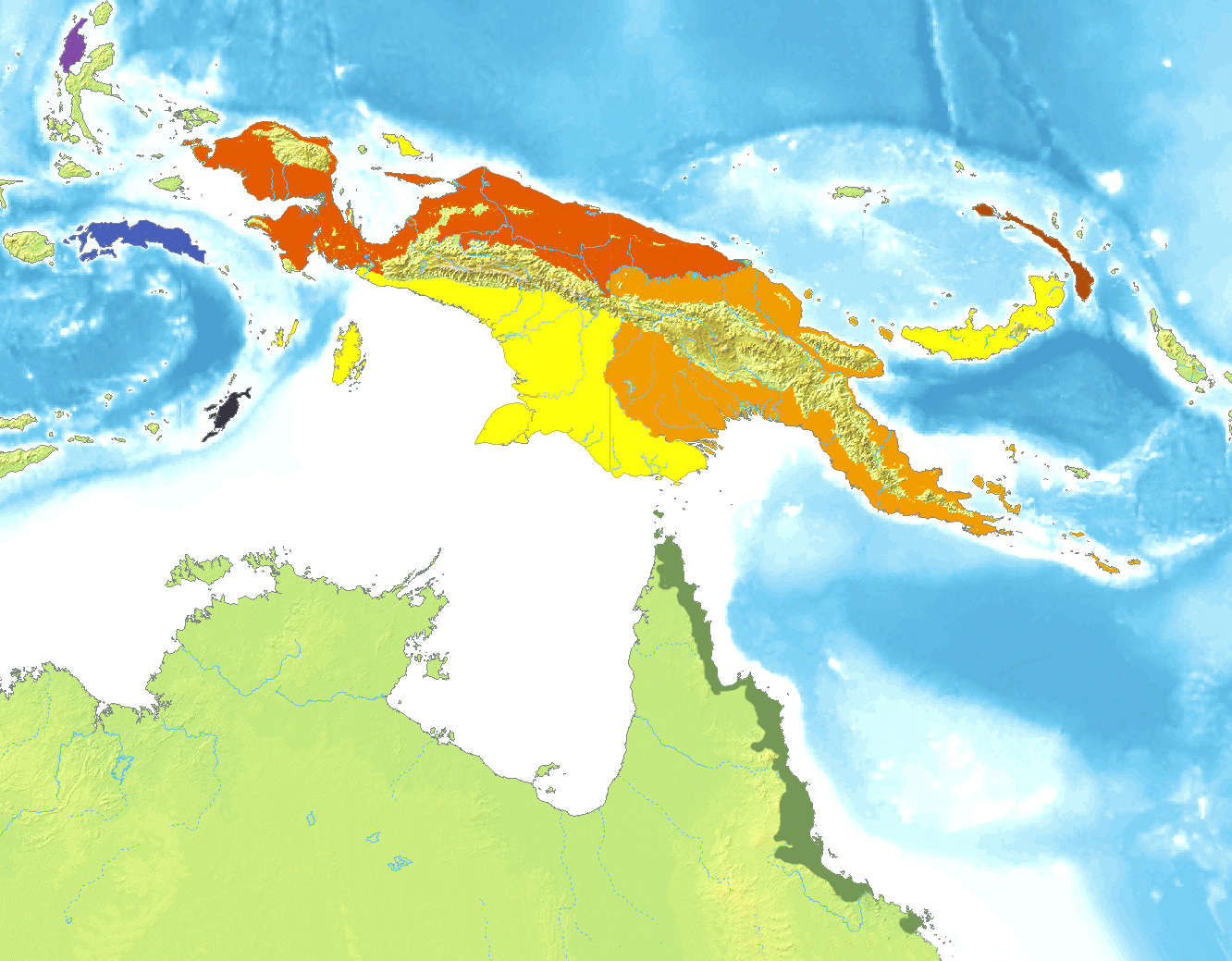
- Range shown as dark orange and bright orange regions

Synonyms
- [Boa] Amethistina Schneider, 1801; Python amethystinus — Daudin, 1803; [Constrictor] amethystina — Wagler, 1830; Boa amethystina — Wagler, 1830; Python amethystinus — Schlegel, 1837; [Boa Python] amethystinus — Schlegel, 1837; Liasis amethystinus — Gray, 1842; Liasis amethystinus — A.M.C. Duméril & Bibron, 1844; Liasis (Simalia) amethystinus — Gray, 1849; Aspidopython Jakati A. Meyer, 1874; Liasis amethystinus — W. Peters & Doria, 1878; Liasis duceboracensis Günther, 1879; Hypaspistes dipsadides Ogilby, 1891; Python amethystinus — Boulenger, 1893; Liasis clarki Barbour, 1914; Liasis a[methistinus]. amethistinus — Stull, 1933; Liasis amethistinus — Brongersma, 1953; Liasis amethystinus amethystinus — Kinghorn, 1956; Liasis amethistinus — Stimson, 1969; Python amethistinus — McDowell, 1975; Morelia amethistina — H.G. Cogger, Cameron & H.M. Cogger, 1983; Australiasis amethistinus — Wells & Wellington, 1984; Morelia amethistina — Underwood & Stimson, 1990; M[orelia]. amethistina — Kluge, 1993; Morelia amethystina — D. Barker & T. Barker, 1994; Morelia amethistina amethistina — O'Shea, 1996; Simalia amethistina — Reynolds et al., 2014

= Amethystine python =

Species of snake

The amethystine python (Simalia amethistina, formerly known as Morelia amethistina), also known as the scrub python or sanca permata in Indonesian, is a species of non-venomous snake in the family Pythonidae. The species is found in Indonesia and Papua New Guinea. Popular among reptile enthusiasts, and noted for its coloration and size, it is one of the largest snakes in the world, as measured either by length or weight, and is the largest native snake in Papua New Guinea. Until 2000, the larger Australian species S. kinghorni was generally considered a subspecies of S. amethistina, and this change of classification has still not been universally reflected in literature. Because of this issue, S. amethistina has often been described as the largest snake in Australia, but this is not accurate since under the current classification, this species does not occur in Australia.

== Taxonomy ==
Formerly, five subspecies of Morelia amethistina, including the nominate race, M. a. amethystina, were generally recognized. The Moluccan Islands (including Halmahera, Ternate and Tidore) are home to the former M. a. tracyae. The Tanimbar Islands are home to a smaller subspecies, the former M. a. nauta. On the island of Seram, the former M. a. clastolepis can be found. On mainland of Papua New Guinea (including the Indonesian western half, once called Irian Jaya—now West Papua), and many of its nearby offshore islands, the former M. a. amethystina is quite common. In Australia, the former M. a. kinghorni is represented. American biologist Michael Harvey and colleagues investigated the amethystine python complex and recognised five separate species – Simalia amethistina, Simalia clastolepis, Simalia kinghorni, Simalia nauta, and Simalia tracyae – based on cladistic analysis of cytochrome b sequences and morphology. In 2014 cladistic analysis of nuclear and mitochondrial genes of pythons and boas, R. Graham Reynolds and colleagues supported the distinctness of M. tracyae, M. amethistina, and M. clastolepis, but were less confident of M. kinghorni and M. nauta.

According to McDiarmid et al. (1999), all cases in which the specific name was spelled with a y follow Daudin's (1803) Python amethystinus and are therefore unjustified emendations. The specific name, amethistina, is an allusion to the milky iridescent sheen on its scales, which gives it an amethyst-like colour.

== Description ==
Specimens of S. amethistina have reportedly been measured at more than 5.5 m (18.0 ft) in total length (including tail), but this is likely due to confusion with Australian S. kinghorni specimens, as even 4 m (13 ft) specimens of S. amethistina are already considered extremely large. Although the amethystine python is smaller than the Australian scrub python, some sources claim that S. amethistina is able to reach lengths of 6 m (20 ft), with a weight up to 27 kg (60 lb).

The smooth dorsal scales are arranged in 39–53 rows at midbody. There are deep, heat-sensing pits on six or seven of the posterior lower labials.

== Distribution and habitat ==
The Amethystine python is found in Indonesia (Maluku Islands, Timur Laut Islands, Banda, Kai Islands, Aru Islands, Misool, Salawati, most of Western New Guinea, many islands in Geelvink Bay, such as Biak, Numfor, Yapen, and Supiori), and Papua New Guinea (including Umboi Island, Bismarck Archipelago, Trobriand Islands, the d'Entrecasteaux Islands to Rossel Island, Louisiade Archipelago). The type locality is unknown.

S. amethistina occurs in both bushland and suburbia. In Indonesia, it is found mostly in rainforests. Warm, humid habitats with good water sources are preferred. In New Guinea, it mostly lives in scrublands.

== Diet ==
The diet of the amethystine python generally consists of birds, bats, rats, possums, and other small mammals. Larger Papuan specimens catch and eat wallabies and cuscus, waiting by creek and river banks for prey seeking drinking water.

== See also ==
- List of largest snakes
