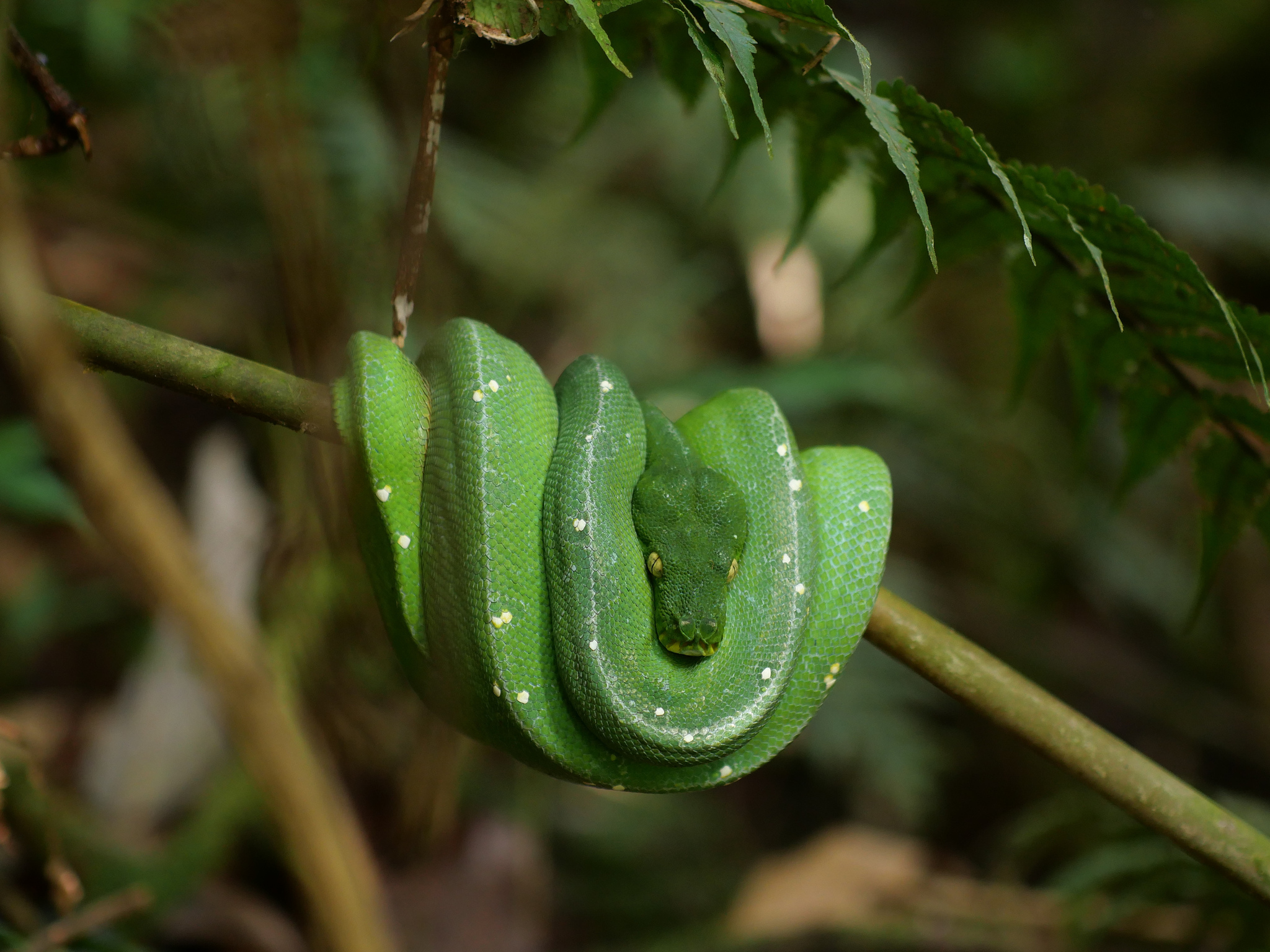

Scientific classification
- Kingdom: Animalia
- Phylum: Chordata
- Class: Reptilia
- Order: Squamata
- Suborder: Serpentes
- Family: Pythonidae
- Genus: Morelia
- Species: M. azurea

Binomial name
- Morelia azurea (Meyer, 1874)

= Morelia azurea =

Species of snake

Morelia azurea is a species of snake. Commonly known as the northern green tree python, this arboreal python was previously included in the Morelia viridis species complex.

According to recent research "Strong genetic structuring of green python populations and species delimitation methods confirm the presence of two species, broadly occurring north and south of New Guinea's central mountains. Our data also support three subspecies within the northern species." namely Morelia azurea azurea (Meyer, 1874), Morelia azurea pulcher (Sauvage, 1878) and Morelia azurea utaraensis (Natusc, et al., 2019).
