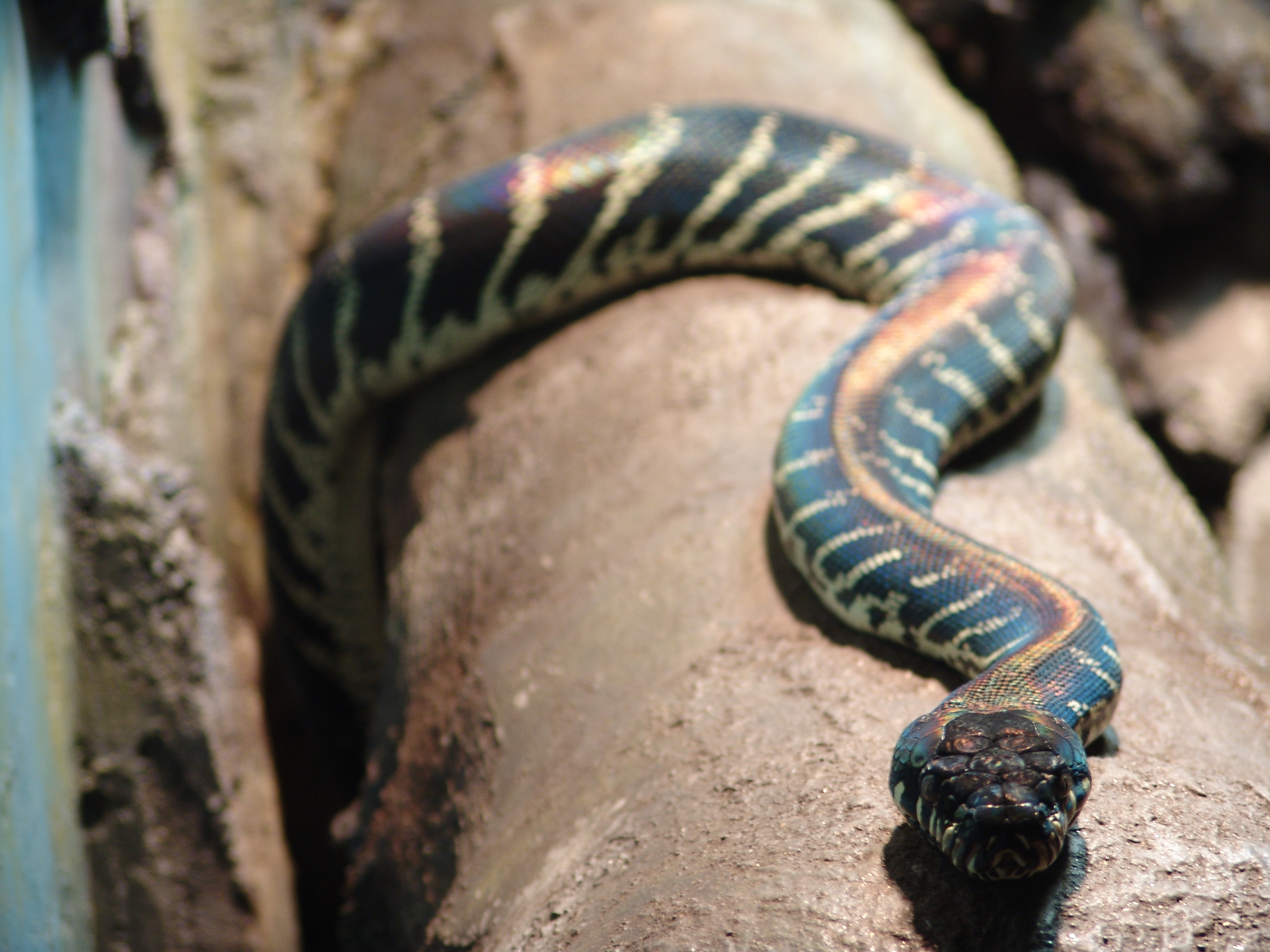

Conservation status
- Least Concern (IUCN 3.1)

Scientific classification
- Kingdom: Animalia
- Phylum: Chordata
- Class: Reptilia
- Order: Squamata
- Suborder: Serpentes
- Family: Pythonidae
- Genus: Simalia
- Species: S. boeleni

Binomial name
- Simalia boeleni (Brongersma, 1953)

Synonyms
- Liasis boeleni Brongersma, 1953; Liasis taronga Worrell, 1958; Liasis boeleni — Stimson, 1969; Python boeleni — McDowell, 1975; Morelia boeleni — Underwood & Stimson, 1990; Simalia boeleni — Reynolds et al., 2014

= Simalia boeleni =

Species of snake

Simalia boeleni is a species of python, a nonvenomous snake in the family Pythonidae. The species is endemic to the mountains of New Guinea. No subspecies are recognized. Its common names include Boelen's python and the black python.

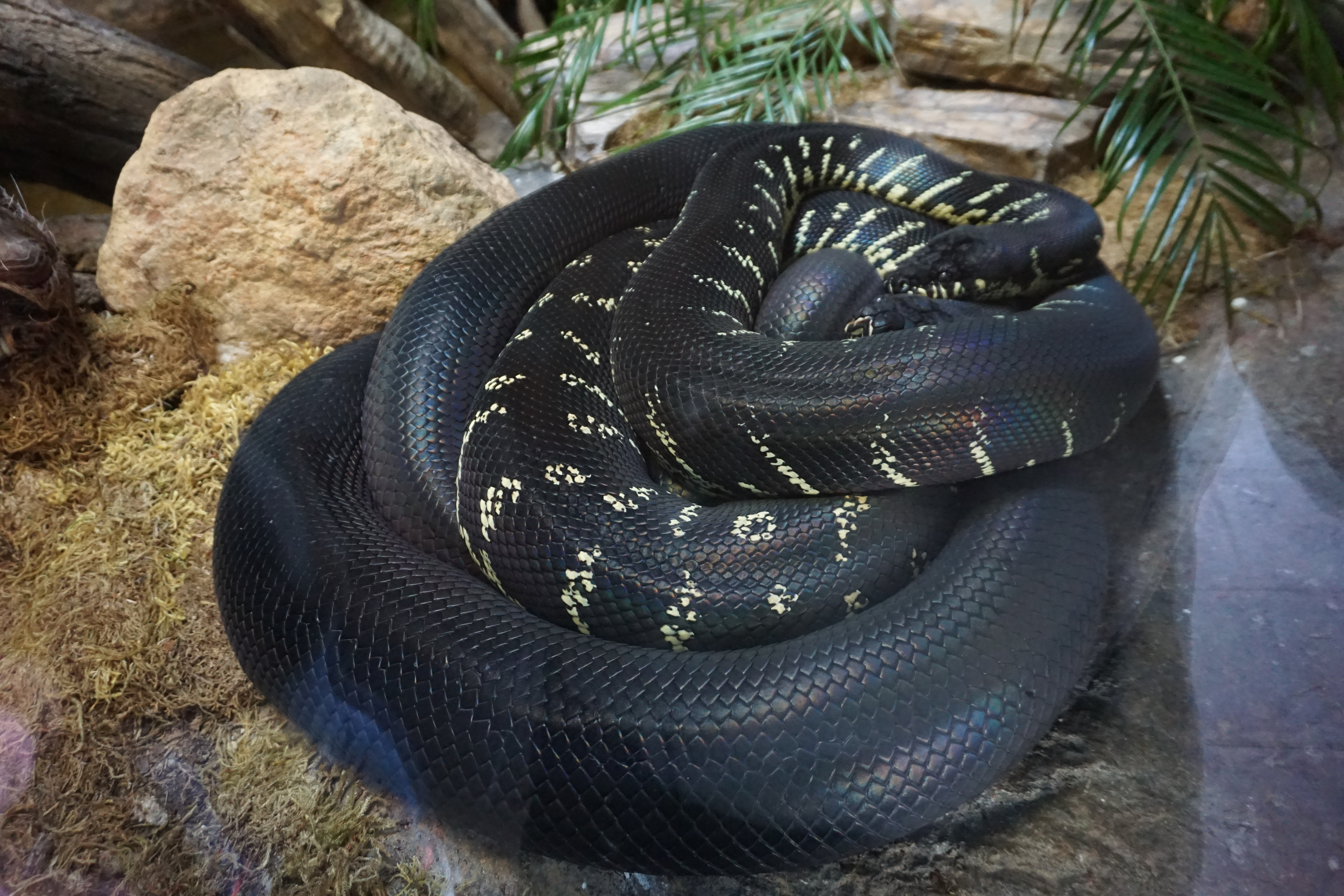
Two coiled-up Boelen's pythons in captivity at the San Diego Zoo

== Etymology ==
The specific name, boeleni, is in honor of K.W.J. Boelen, M.D., who collected the holotype specimen.

== Description ==
In S. boeleni adults, the upperside color pattern is dark bluish-black or purplish-black, and the anterior part of the underside is white to pale yellow. The white extends up the flanks as a series of streaks. The upper and lower lips are also patterned with pale or whitish labial scales. The black portions are commonly iridescent with an oil-slick-like sheen. The body is stocky and the head large. Neonates are predominantly red upon emerging from the egg. Gradual black pigmentation presents itself as the neonate grows and sheds. Ontogenetic color change begins as the juvenile snake approaches 1 m (39 in) in length, usually around 2 years of age. Adults may be up to 3 m (9.8 ft) in total length (including tail).

== Conservation status ==
The Boelen's python receives the highest legal protection possible in Papua New Guinea. It is currently listed on CITES Appendix II. It is difficult to assess the conservation status of these snakes, as they are incredibly secretive and difficult to find in the wild.

== Common names ==
Locally, S. boeleni is also known as the blu moran or papa graun. Within Indonesia, it has several names depending on which language is used. The common Indonesian names of this snake are sanca hitam, sanca bulan, piton hitam, and ular buleni.

== Geographic range ==
S. boeleni is found in Indonesia (Western New Guinea in the Paniai Lakes region) and Papua New Guinea (the provinces of Eastern Highlands, Central and Morobe, and Goodenough Island).

The type locality given is "Dimija (3[°] 56' S, 136[°] 18' E), Wissel Lakes, Dutch New Guinea, about 1750 m (5700 feet) above sea-level" [Western New Guinea, Indonesia].

== Habitat ==
S. boeleni inhabits forested montane regions at elevations of 1,000–2,000 m (3,300–6,600 ft). It is generally encountered on the forest floor, but is also reckoned to be an able climber.

== Diet ==
The diet of S. boeleni consists of small mammals, ground-nesting birds, and lizards.

== Captivity ==
S. boeleni is considered to be highly desirable by private keepers due to its beauty, but is also exceptionally rare in collections. Although captive-born snakes are fairly hardy in captivity, wild-caught individuals are considerably more difficult to keep successfully. Captive breeding is exceedingly rare, and the conditions necessary are still unclear. Many specific strategies have been employed to attempt to get these rare snakes to breed.

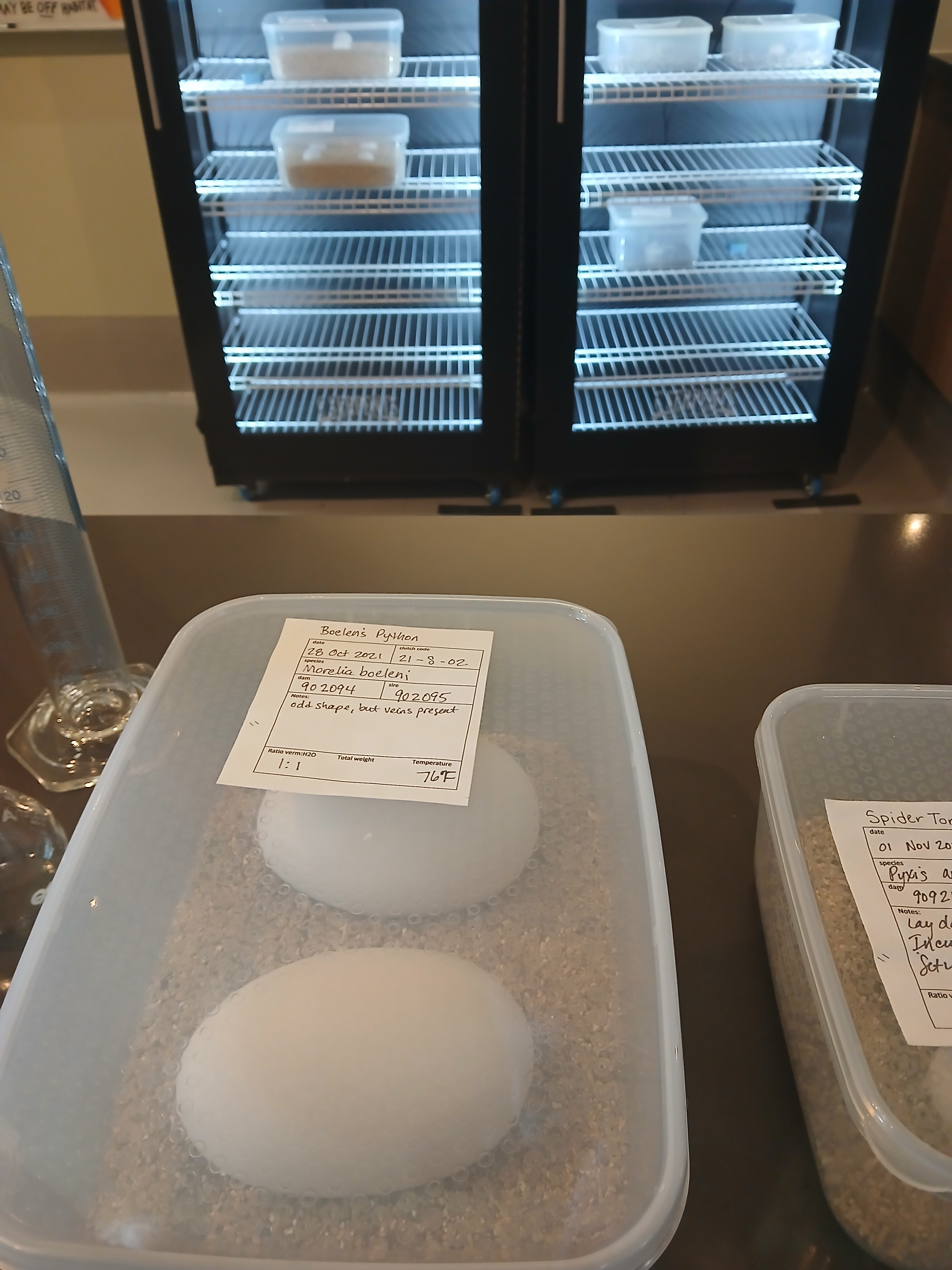
Boelen's Python egg at the San Diego Zoo
