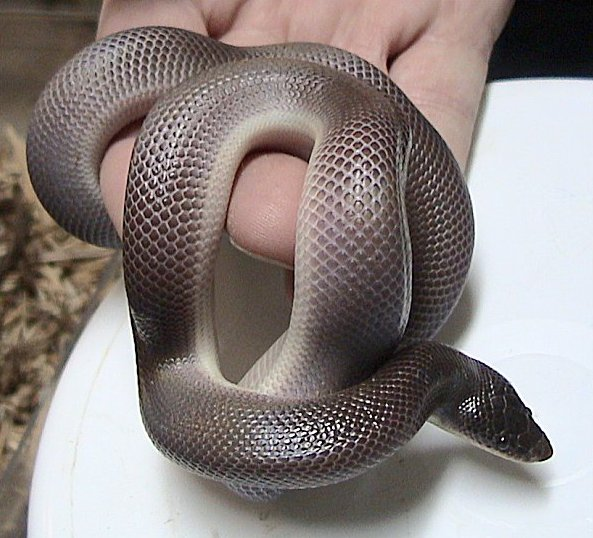

Conservation status
- Least Concern (IUCN 3.1)
- CITES Appendix II

Scientific classification
- Kingdom: Animalia
- Phylum: Chordata
- Class: Reptilia
- Order: Squamata
- Suborder: Serpentes
- Family: Loxocemidae; Cope, 1861
- Genus: Loxocemus; Cope, 1861
- Species: L. bicolor

Binomial name
- Loxocemus bicolor Cope, 1861

Synonyms
- Loxocemi - Cope, 1861; Plastoseryx - Jan, 1862; Plastoseryx Bronni - Jan, 1862; Loxocemus Sumichrasti - Bocourt, 1876; Loxocemus bicolor bicolor - Woodbury & Woodbury, 1944; Loxocemus bicolor sumichrasti - Woodbury & Woodbury, 1944

= Loxocemus =

Genus of snakes

Loxocemus bicolor, the sole member of the monotypic family Loxocemidae and commonly known as the Mexican python, Mexican burrowing python and Mexican burrowing snake, is a species of python-like snake found in Mexico and Central America. No subspecies are currently recognized. Analyses of DNA show that Loxocemus is most closely related to the true pythons and the sunbeam snakes.

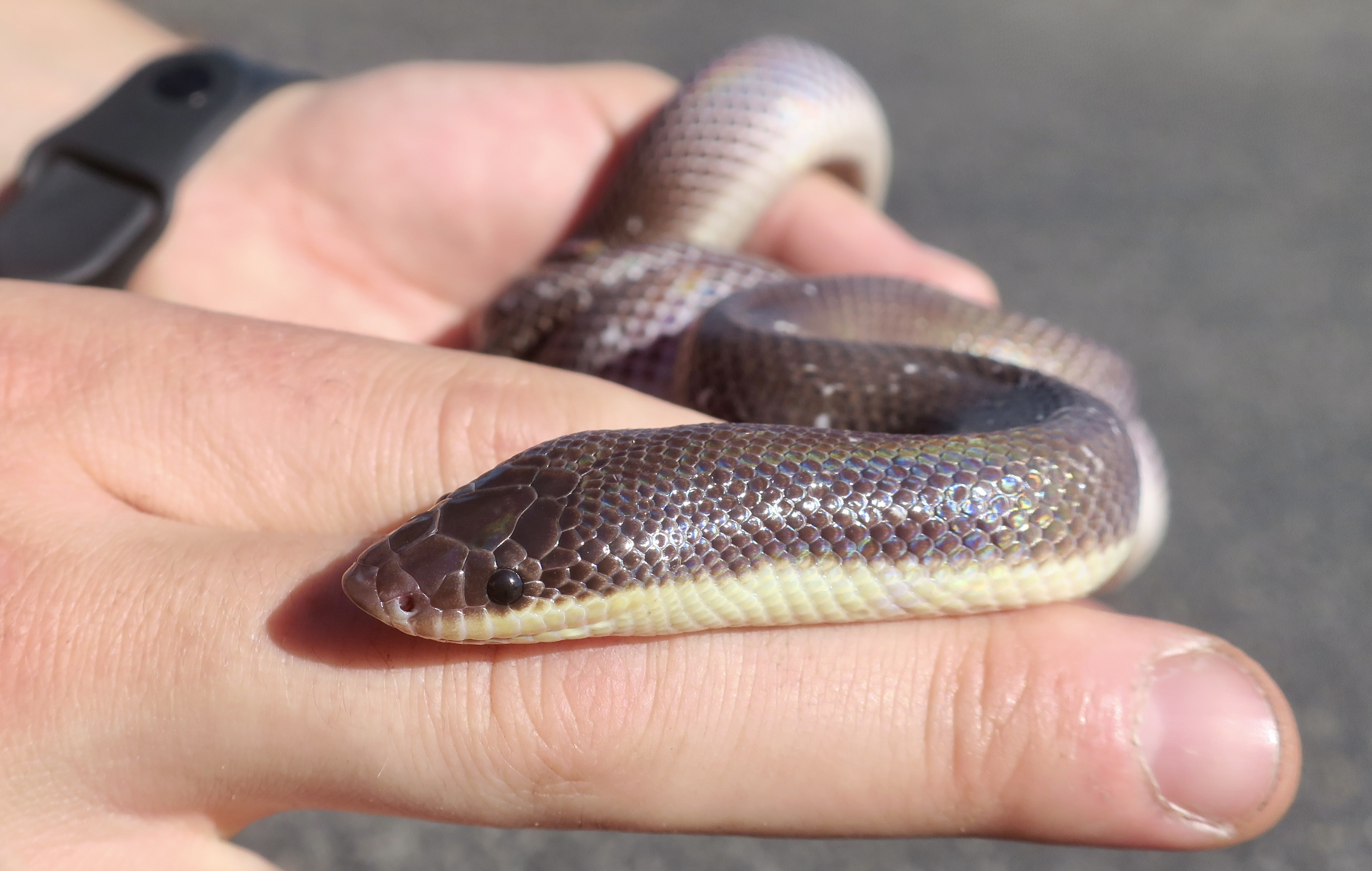
At 9th Island Reptiles, a reptile store in Las Vegas

== Description ==
Adults can grow to a maximum of 1.57 m (62 in) in length, with most individuals averaging a length of 1 to 1.3 m (3.3 to 4.3 ft). The body is stout and very muscular. The snout is shovel-shaped, with a narrow head and small eyes to facilitate burrowing. It has been observed that both male and females have various scent glands on their bodies that secrete fatty acids and alcohols to deter nuisance arthropods, such as ants or other burrowing insects. The species is described as terrestrial and semi-fossorial, which makes them hard to observe and study. The color pattern is usually dark with patches of white scales, although occasionally after shedding all pigment will disappear, resulting in a white snake with only a small dark patch on its head. Scale coloring can also vary between pinkish-brown and reddish-brown, a source of camouflage depending on the soil type of the region an individual typically inhabits.

== Distribution and habitat ==
It is found along the Mexican Pacific versant at low to moderate elevations in the states of Nayarit, Jalisco, Colima, Michoacán, Morelos, Guerrero, Oaxaca, and Chiapas. From there, its range extends south through Guatemala, Honduras, El Salvador, Nicaragua, and Costa Rica. The type locality given is "La Unión, San Salvador" (in El Salvador).

== Life cycle ==
They are found in a variety of habitats, including tropical, moist, and dry forests. In Honduras and Guatemala, they also occur in dry inland valleys that drain into the Caribbean. Their diet is believed to consist of rodents and lizards. In addition, they prey on arthropods, such as underground insects and centipedes, as well as worms. They have also been observed eating iguana eggs, in addition to having been observed to eat sea turtle eggs and hatchlings when food is scarce. They are oviparous, laying clutches of three to six eggs. In order to consume eggs, individuals have been observed to wrap two to three loops of its anterior trunk to pressurize and pierce an egg before swallowing the yolk whole.
