= Tracy M. Barker =

American herpetologist

Tracy Jo Barker
- Born: Tracy Miller; December 10, 1957 (age 68)
- Occupation: Herpetologist specializing in pythons
- Spouse: David G. Barker
- Father: J. Jefferson Miller

Tracy Jo Barker (née Miller) (born December 10, 1957) is an American herpetologist specializing in pythons.

Barker grew up in Washington, D.C., as the daughter of J. Jefferson Miller who was Curator of ceramics and glass at the Smithsonian Institution. After an undergraduate degree in psychology at the University of Colorado, she graduated in biology at the Central Michigan University. She also worked as a reptile keeper at Buffalo Zoological Gardens. Already in her early years, she specialized in herpetology and focused on animal behavior. She worked as a field biologist for repopulating Green Iguanas in Panama and studied the reproductive behavior of Tuatara on Stephens Island in New Zealand.

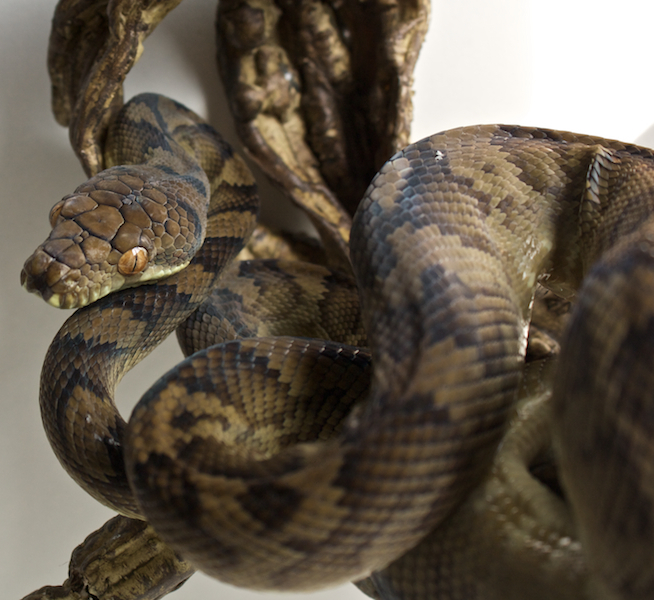
Halmahera python (Morelia tracyae)

In 1990 she and her husband, biologist David G. Barker, founded Vida Preciosa International, Inc. (VPI), an enterprise dedicated to the research necessary to establish self-sustaining captive populations of pythons and boas. This facility became one of the largest and most diverse collection of pythons in the world; in 1997, the Barkers and their work at VPI were featured in a National Geographic Television documentary titled “Passion for Pythons”. They managed to reproduce 32 of the 52 recognized taxa of pythons. Among them, the first ever reproduction of 12 taxa.

Barker has written numerous papers in scientific journals as well as dozens of popular publications. In 1979, Barker described a new species of python Python saxuloides, which is currently regarded as a slightly distinct Kenyan population of the later re-erected Python natalensis. One of her five books, Pythons of the World, Volume 2: Ball Pythons, was certified as “The Best Animal Book of 2006” by the Independent Publisher Book Awards.

In 2000 a new species of python, Morelia tracyae, was named in her honor.

== Books ==
- Pythons of the World, Volume 3: The Pythons of Asia and the Malay Archipelago. with David G. Barker and Mark Auliya. VPI Library, Boerne, Texas, 2018. 371 pp.
- The Invisible Ark – In Defense of Captivity. with David G. Barker. VPI Library, Boerne, Texas, 2014. 169 pp.
- Pythons of the World, Volume 2: Ball Pythons: The History, Natural History, Care and Breeding. with David G. Barker. VPI Library, Boerne, Texas, 2006. 321pp.
- Pythons of the World, Volume 1, Australia. with David G. Barker. The Herpetocultural Library, Advanced Vivarium Systems, Lakeside, California, 1994. 171 pp.
- The Ball Python Manual. with Philippe de Vosjoli, Roger Klingenberg and David G. Barker. The Herpetocultural Library, Advanced Vivarium Systems, Lakeside, California, 1994. 76 pp.
