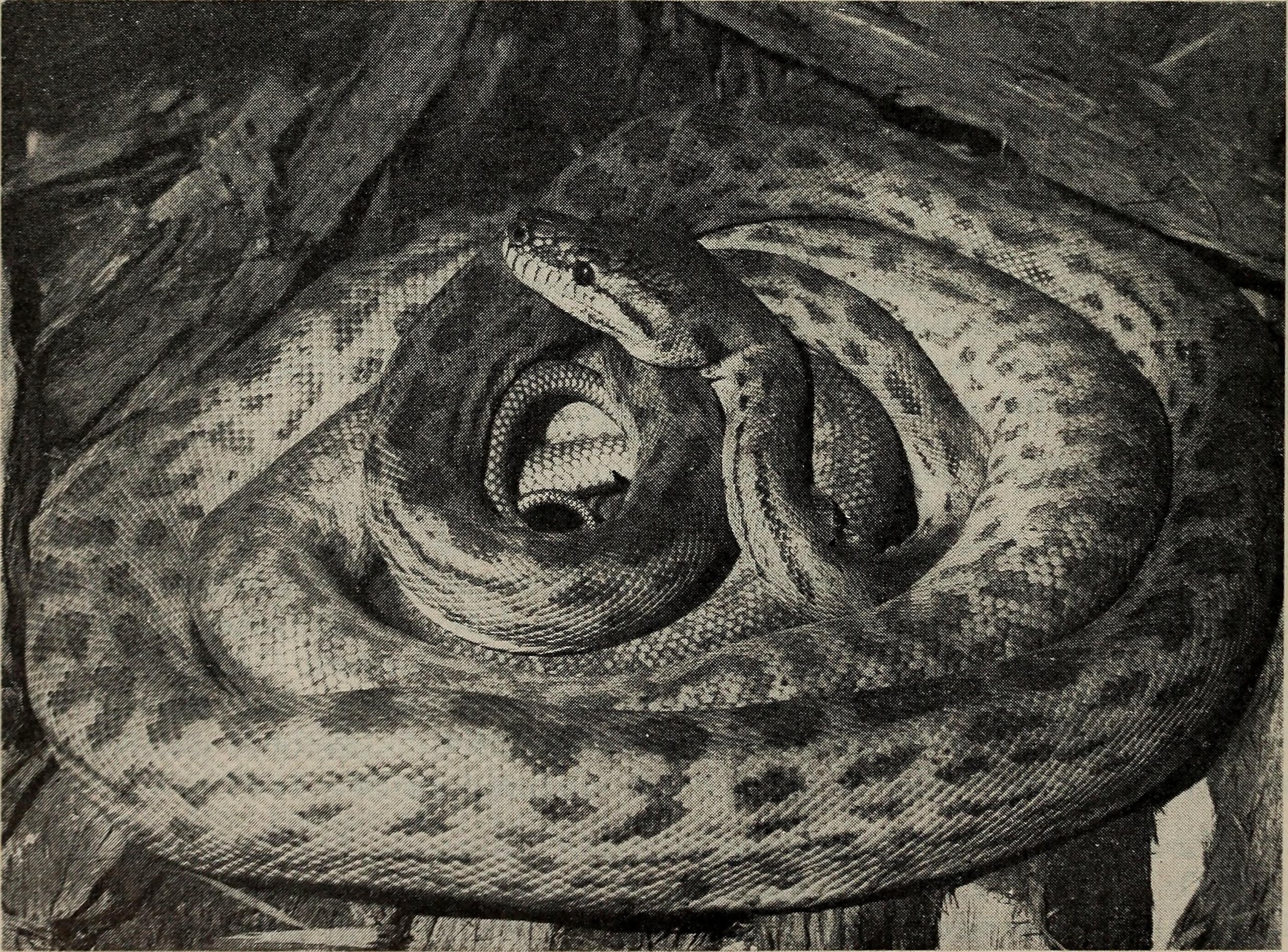

Conservation status
- Vulnerable (IUCN 3.1)

Scientific classification
- Kingdom: Animalia
- Phylum: Chordata
- Class: Reptilia
- Order: Squamata
- Suborder: Serpentes
- Family: Pythonidae
- Genus: Nyctophilopython; Wells & Wellington, 1985
- Species: N. oenpelliensis

Binomial name
- Nyctophilopython oenpelliensis (Gow, 1977)

Synonyms
- Python oenpelliensis Gow, 1977; Morelia oenpelliensis — H.G. Cogger, Cameron & H.M. Cogger, 1983; Australiasis oenpelliensis — Wells & Wellington, 1984; Nyctophilopython oenpelliensis — Wells & Wellington, 1985; M[orelia]. oenpelliensis — Kluge, 1993; Simalia oenpelliensis — Reynolds, Niemiller & Revell, 2014; Nawaran oenpelliensis — Esquerré et al. 2020; Nyctophilopython oenpelliensis — Kaiser, Thomson & Shea, 2020

= Oenpelli python =

Species of snake

The Oenpelli python or Oenpelli rock python (Simalia oenpelliensis or Nyctophilopython oenpelliensis) is a species of large snake in the family Pythonidae. The species is endemic to the sandstone massif area of the western Arnhem Land region in the Northern Territory of Australia. There are no subspecies that are recognised as being valid. It has been called the rarest python in the world. Two notable characteristics of the species are the unusually large size of its eggs and its ability to change colour. It is the longest snake native to the Northern Territory.

== Taxonomy and etymology ==
The Oenpelli python was assigned to a taxonomy in 1977 by Gow, who placed it in the genus Python. It was then categorised by Cogger and Cameron as a species of Morelia. In 1984, Wells and Wellington placed it into a new genus Nyctophilopython, and in 2014, a work by Reynolds, Niemiller, and Revell proposed to classify it as Simalia.

The specific name, oenpelliensis, is derived from the type locality, which is given as "6.5 km S.W. of Oenpelli, Northern Territory, Australia (12°21'S, 133°01'E)". In 2020, the name Nawaran was erected for the genus, overlooking the available name Nyctophilopython for the species which was immediately synonymised with the resurrected Nyctophilopython.

As of September 2024, ITIS and the IUCN Red List identify the Simalia classification as valid, while The Reptile Database uses Nyctophilopython.

== Description ==
A large and rare species of the monotypic genus Nyctophilopython, the Oenpelli python may grow to more than 4 m (13 ft) in total length (including tail), and one specimen in captivity is reportedly more than 5 m (16 ft) in total length. The species is unusually thin in proportion to its length, relative to other pythons.

The dorsal colour pattern is dark olive-brown with darkened blotches. The belly is pale and dull, varying from cream to yellow.

The Oenpelli python is able to change its skin colouration, which tends to be lighter at night and darker in the daytime.

The eggs of the Oenpelli python have been described as "huge". At 110.5 by 60 mm (4.35 by 2.36 in), they are almost twice the size of those for the related amethystine python (Simalia amethystina), which are reported as 70–98 by 45–56 mm (2.8–3.9 by 1.8–2.2 in).

== Behaviour ==
The Oenpelli python is nocturnal and inhabits rock crevices, trees, and caves.

It feeds on birds in fruiting trees, and has been speculated to specialise in eating birds. Adults prey on medium-to-large mammals, such as possum or large macropods. Captive specimens eat birds and rodents.

It is an ambush predator that remains motionless for long periods.

== Distribution and habitat ==
The Oenpelli python occurs in a restricted range in the Northern Territory, in the sandstone outcrops of western Arnhem Land.

The species is found in habitat located on a sandstone massif, in the regions surrounding the upper reaches of the Cadell, South Alligator and East Alligator rivers. It is territorial, roaming between discrete positions, such as overhangs and caves in sandstone gorges or in a shady tree. Sightings are also reported in the region's woodland, heathland, and open rocky plains. It is noted as having an association with the Kombalgie sandstone gorges. It is said to be associated with sandstone rock outcrops with dense vegetation.

== Conservation status ==
The total population of N. oenpelliensis is poorly surveyed, and no study has been made of the rate of its decline. This is partly due to the inaccessibility of the region, a factor that may help the preservation of the species. The conservation status of Nyctophilopython oenpelliensis is listed by the Northern Territory Government as vulnerable to extinction. This has been evaluated by known threatening factors, such as altered land use and fire regimes, and population inferred from the relative abundance of its prey. This is estimated to be below 10,000, which is inferred from several factors. As a large predator, the species is particularly vulnerable to declines in available prey. These larger mammals are more susceptible to changes in land use and threats such as introduced species. Suitable habitat is also limited in the distribution range of the species. The species is known to be illegally collected for private use, which is likely to impact on some subpopulations. This threat is limited by the inaccessibility of its habitat, the same factor that has restricted study of the species. Variation and decline in subpopulations has not been fully evaluated. It is found within a conservation reserve known as Kakadu National Park.

An attempt to start a breeding program was begun in 2012 and has had some limited success. As of July, 2014, the program included six specimens. In early 2015, the first two captive-bred neonates were born. One of the pythons in the program is featured at the Crocosaurus Cove herpetarium attraction in Darwin, Australia, which may be the only facility in the world that has a specimen on display for the general public.

== In Aboriginal language and culture ==
In the Kunwinjku language spoken in Oenpelli itself (now known as Gunbalanya), the Oenpelli python is called nawaran. The Oenpelli python has historically been a totemic creature for the Bininj Aboriginal people and because of its iridescent scales it may also be associated with the Rainbow Serpent.
