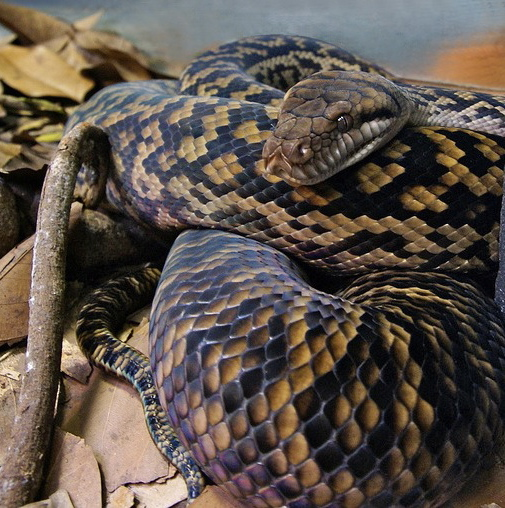

Scientific classification
- Kingdom: Animalia
- Phylum: Chordata
- Class: Reptilia
- Order: Squamata
- Suborder: Serpentes
- Family: Pythonidae
- Genus: Simalia
- Species: S. kinghorni

Binomial name
- Simalia kinghorni (Stull, 1933)

Synonyms
- Liasis amethistinus kinghorni Stull, 1933; Australiasis kinghorni — Wells & Wellington, 1984; Morelia kinghorni — Harvey et al., 2000; Simalia kinghorni — Reynolds et al., 2014

= Australian scrub python =

Simalia kinghorni

Species of snake

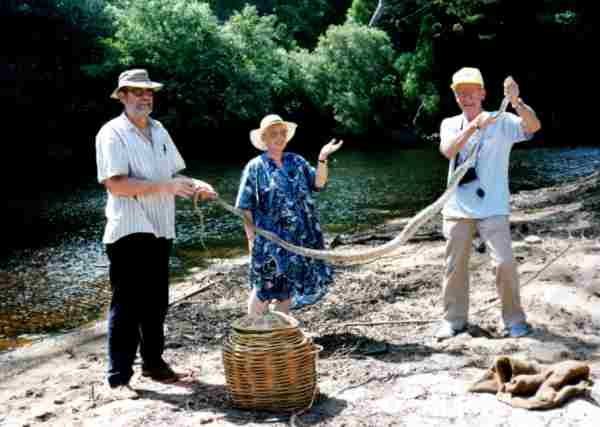
Releasing a scrub python back to the wild, near Cooktown. 1999

The Australian scrub python (Simalia kinghorni), also known commonly as Kinghorn's python and simply as the scrub python is a species of snake in the family Pythonidae. The species is indigenous to forests of northern Australia. It is one of the world's longest and largest snakes, and is the longest and largest in Australia. In 2014 it was reclassified to the genus Simalia from Morelia, alongside the rest of the scrub python species.

== Taxonomy ==
American herpetologist Olive Griffith Stull described this taxon as Liasis amethistinus kinghorni in 1933 from a specimen at the Museum of Comparative Zoology which had been collected at Lake Barrine in north Queensland, classifying it as a subspecies of the amethystine python based on its larger number of scales. the specific name, kinghorni, is in honour of Australian herpetologist and ornithologist James Roy Kinghorn. It was first raised to species status by Wells and Wellington in 1984, and given the name Australiasis kinghorni. American biologist Michael Harvey and colleagues investigated the amethystine python complex and confirmed its classification as a separate species based on cladistic analysis of mitochondrial cytochrome b sequences and morphology. In 2014 cladistic analysis of nuclear and mitochondrial genes of pythons and boas, R. Graham Reynolds and colleagues concluded that the support for its distinctness was weak.

== Description ==
The Australian scrub python is commonly considered arboreal or tree-dwelling, making it one of the world's largest and longest arboreal species of snakes. This snake has an ornate dorsal pattern consisting of browns and tans, with many different natural variations, and an iridescent sheen. Its belly is usually white, sometimes with some yellows. The top of the head is covered with large symmetrical shields, and there are heat-sensing pits on the rostral and some labials.

=== Size ===
S. kinghorni exhibits sexual dimorphism, with males usually growing a third longer and twice as heavy than females. Females reach sexual maturity with a snout-to-vent length (SVL) of about 2.27 m (7.4 ft) while males reach sexual maturity with an SVL of 1.34 m (4.4 ft). On the Tully River, a river about 140 km south of Cairns, 24 adult females were measured. They had an average SVL of 2.68 m (8.8 ft) and a mass of 3.4 kg (7.5 lb). In the same place, 80 adult males had an average SVL of 2.91 m (9.5 ft) and a weight of 5.1 kg (11 lb). Of these, the largest male had an SVL of 3.76 m (12.3 ft) and a weight of 11 kg (24 lb). In the past, data on the lengths of individuals longer than 6 meters were repeatedly mentioned in the literature, and all of them today can no longer be verified and cause serious doubts, in particular, in Fearn & Sambono (2000). The most extreme information comes from Worell, who reported in 1954 second-hand about an animal allegedly 8.5 m (28 ft) long from Greenhill in Cairns, described it as 7.6 m (25 ft) in 1958 and repeatedly mentioned the same thing in 1963 under the first length. He leaves open the question of whether the reported length refers to a corpse or to skin stretched more than 3 m (9.8 ft). Dean also describes an extremely large specimen from Barron Falls in 1954 with a total length of 7.2 m (24 ft), which, however, consisted of an artificially stretched frame that decomposed in the tropics for more than two days, though it was considered reliable by the staff of the Guinness Book of World Records. The largest female Australian scrub python seriously measured to date was caught in Palm Cove near Cairns in 2000, had a total length (including tail) of 5.65 m (18.5 ft), a head length of 12 cm (4.7 in), a tail length of 75 cm (30 in), a circumference at midbody of 36 cm (14 in), and a weight of 24 kg (53 lb). The largest male seriously measured to date was discovered in Kuranda in 2002. Its length was 5.33 m (17.5 ft), of which the length of the head was 11 cm (4.3 in), the incomplete tail was 60 cm (24 in), and the weight was 19 kg (42 lb). However, heavier individuals have been measured, some weighing more than 27 kg (60 lb) with a length of more than 5 m (16 ft).

== Distribution and habitat ==
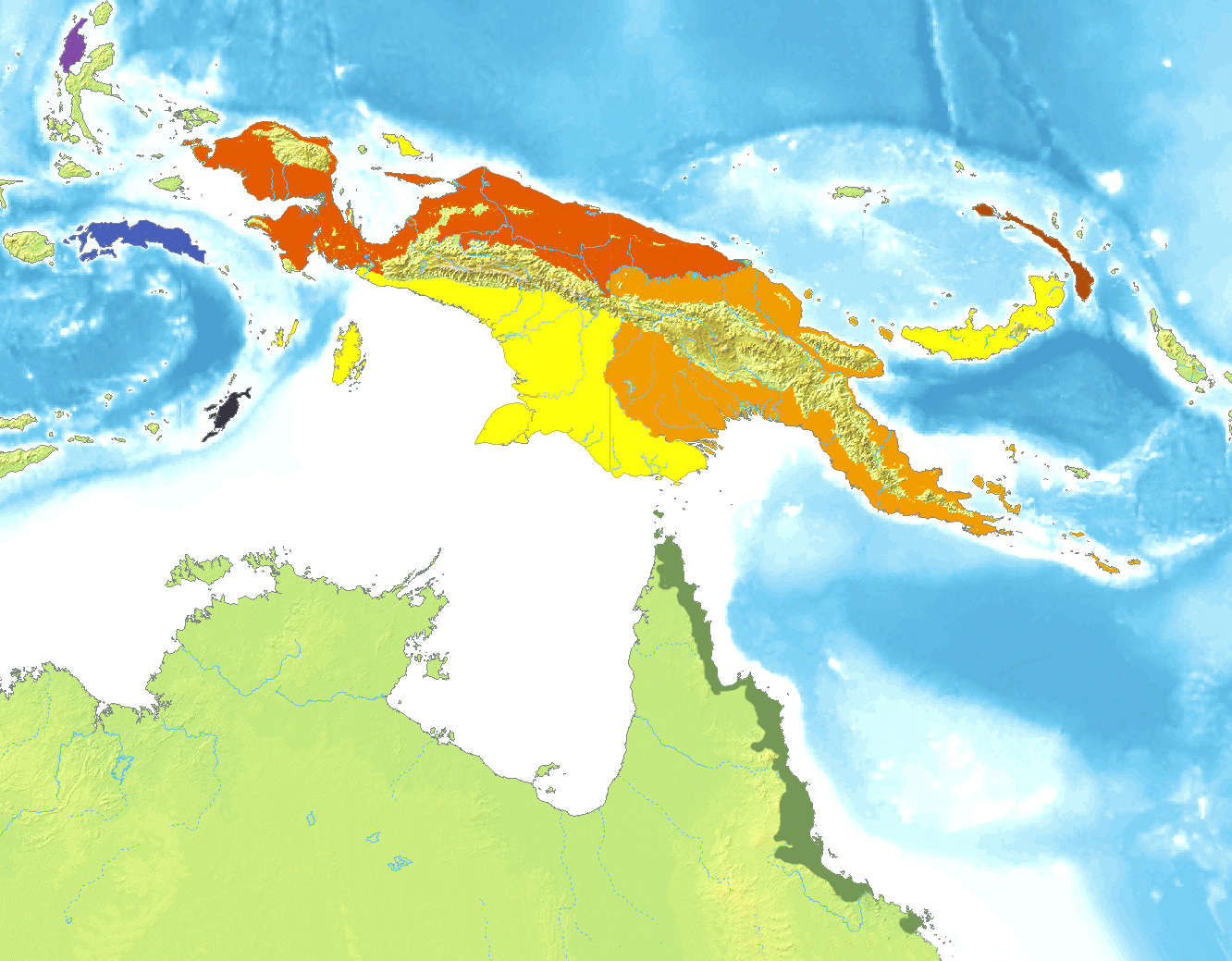
Distribution of S. kinghorni: range shown as dark green region

S. kinghorni in mostly is found in Northern Australia, in Queensland and Cape York Peninsula. The species also occurs in several Islands of Torres Strait (e.g. Hinchinbrook). On the mainland, its range extends from the tip of the Cape York Peninsula south along the coastal rainforest through the Atherton Tableland, the forested eastern foothills of the Great Dividing Range, along the coast through Mount Speck to the Burdekin River south of Townsville. In 2004, an even more southern population was described in the Conway rainforest, south of Airlie Beach. Accurate information about the population size and possible connections with more northern populations is not yet available. However, it is assumed that it was installed in 1990 by adult animals that escaped from the local zoo, and has been successfully distributed since then living within various forests and more densely vegetated parts of the Australian bush.

== Diet ==
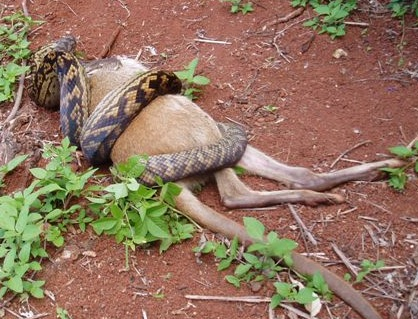
Scrub python swallows small wallaby near Daintree National Park, Australia

S. kinghorni is one of the largest land predators in Australia, and depending on the habitat, age and size, the prey range can vary from small mammals, birds and reptiles to wallabies. The basis of the diet consists of birds and mammals. Among them, for example, rainbow bee-eaters (Merops ornatus), bush rats (Rattus fuscipes), northern quolls (Dasyurus hallucatus), spectacled flying fox (Pteropus conspicillatus), northern brown bandicoots (Isoodon macrourus), long-nosed bandicoots (Perameles nasuta) and striped possums (Dactylopsila trivirgata). In addition, on the outskirts of settlements, the species repeatedly feeds on domestic poultry. Relatively often there is also predation of pythons on small wallaby species in particular agile wallabies (Notamacropus agilis), red-legged pademelons (Thylogale stigmatica) and Bennett's tree-kangaroos (Dendrolagus bennettianus). One of the largest animal victims documented to date was a 10 kg (22 lb) adult mobile wallaby, which was swallowed by a female python 4.33 m (14.2 ft) long and weighing 13.5 kg (30 lb).

== Gallery ==
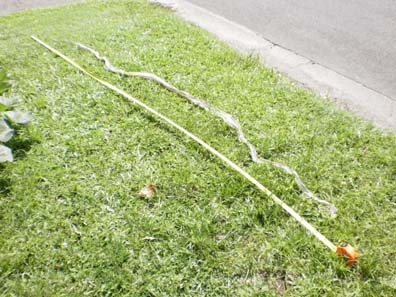
A 3.2-m-long, intact Australian scrub python skin in Australia: The snake that shed this skin would be significantly shorter than 3.2 m, as the snake's skin is folded on top of and below each scale. This causes a shed skin to be almost twice as long as the snake that shed it.

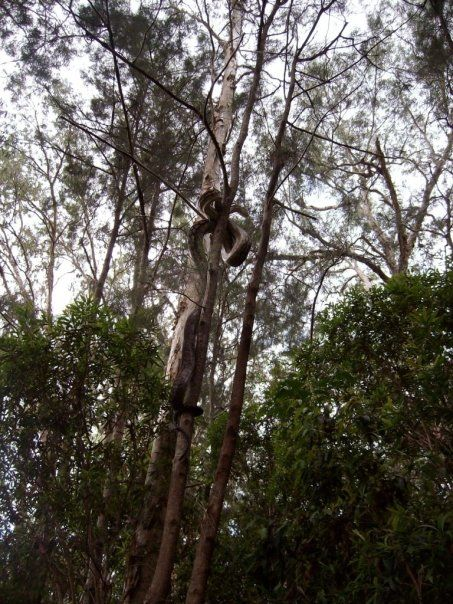
Wild S. kinghorni, North Queensland

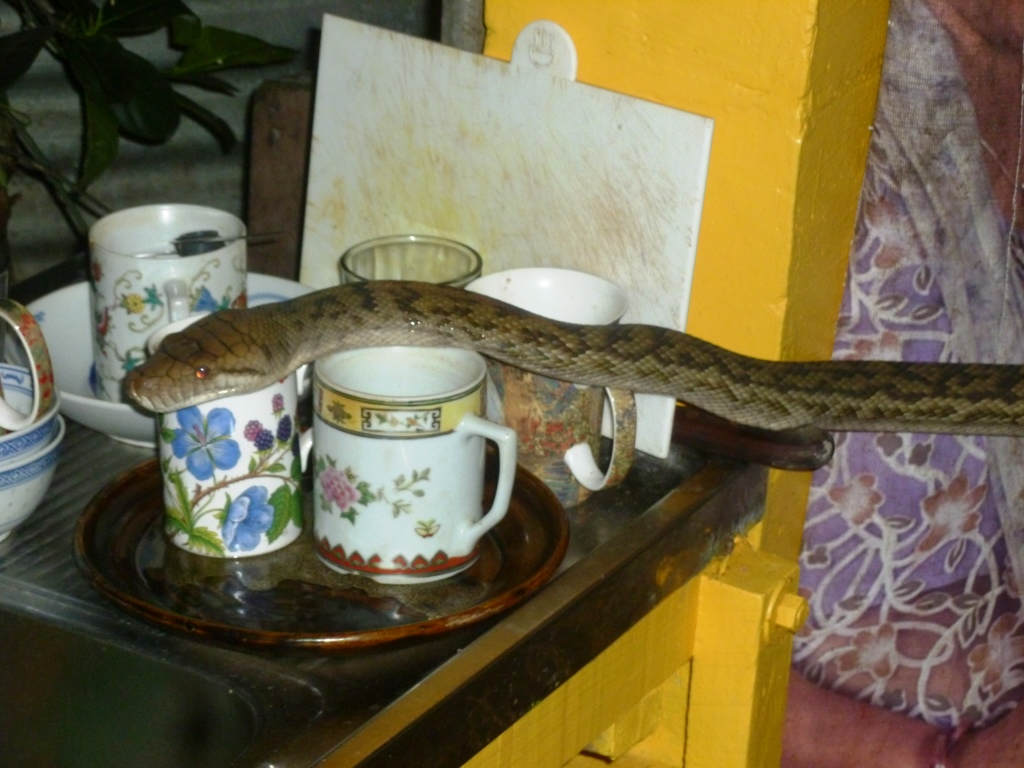
Australian scrub python near Cooktown, Queensland, Australia, 2014

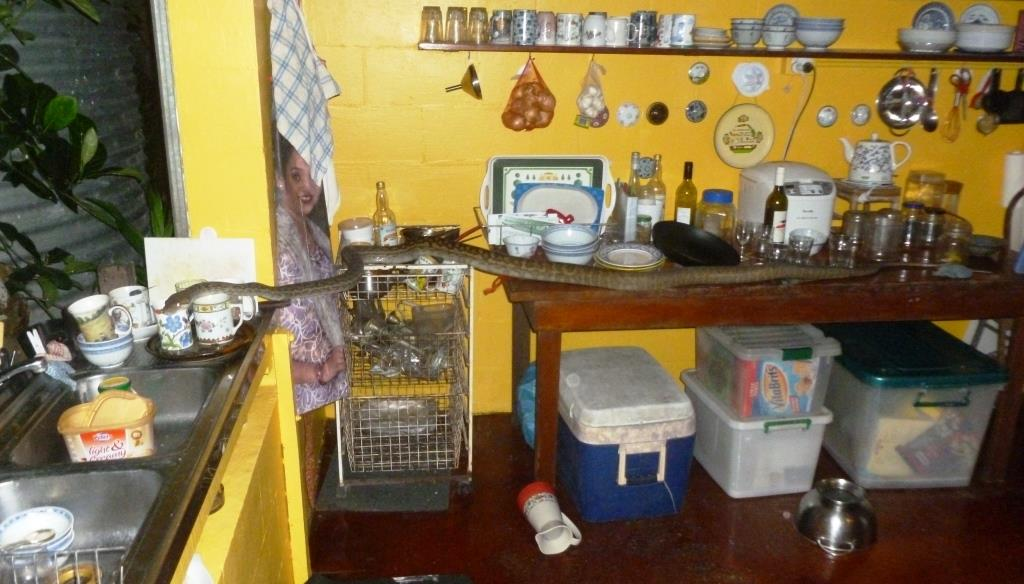
Australian scrub python visiting a kitchen at a home near Cooktown, Queensland, Australia, 2014

== See also ==
- List of largest snakes
