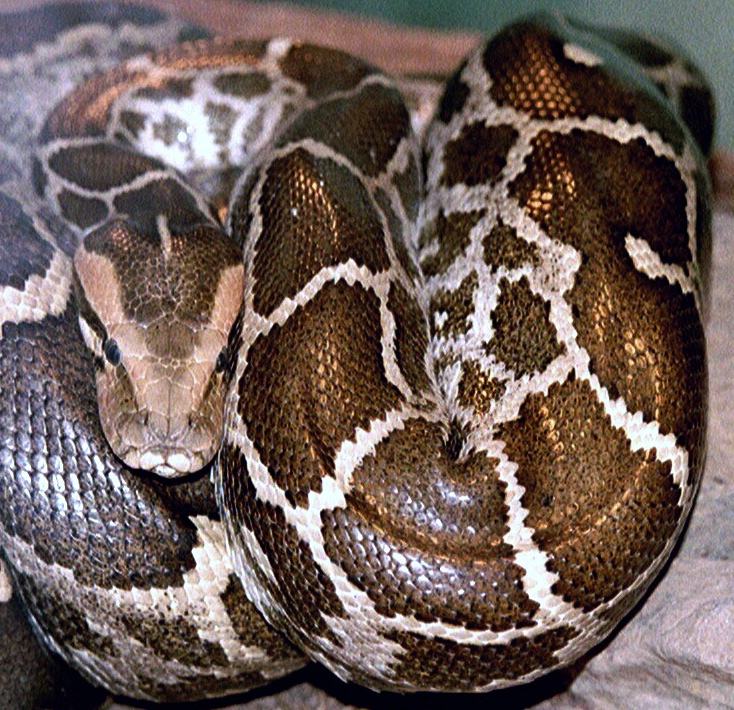
- Indian python (Python molurus)

Scientific classification
- Kingdom: Animalia
- Phylum: Chordata
- Class: Reptilia
- Order: Squamata
- Suborder: Serpentes
- Superfamily: Pythonoidea
- Family: Pythonidae; Fitzinger, 1826
- Pythonidae distribution

Synonyms
- Pythonoidia - Fitzinger, 1826; Pythonoidei – Eichwald, 1831; Holodonta – Müller, 1832; Pythonina – Bonaparte, 1840; Pythophes – Fitzinger, 1843; Pythoniens – A.M.C. Duméril & Bibron, 1844; Holodontes – A.M.C. Duméril & Bibron, 1844; Pythonides – A.M.C. Duméril & Bibron, 1844; Pythones – Cope, 1861; Pythonidae – Cope, 1864; Peropodes – Meyer, 1874; Chondropythonina – Boulenger, 1879; Pythoninae – Boulenger, 1890; Pythonini – Underwood & Stimson, 1990; Moreliini – Underwood & Stimson, 1990

= Pythonidae =

Family of snakes

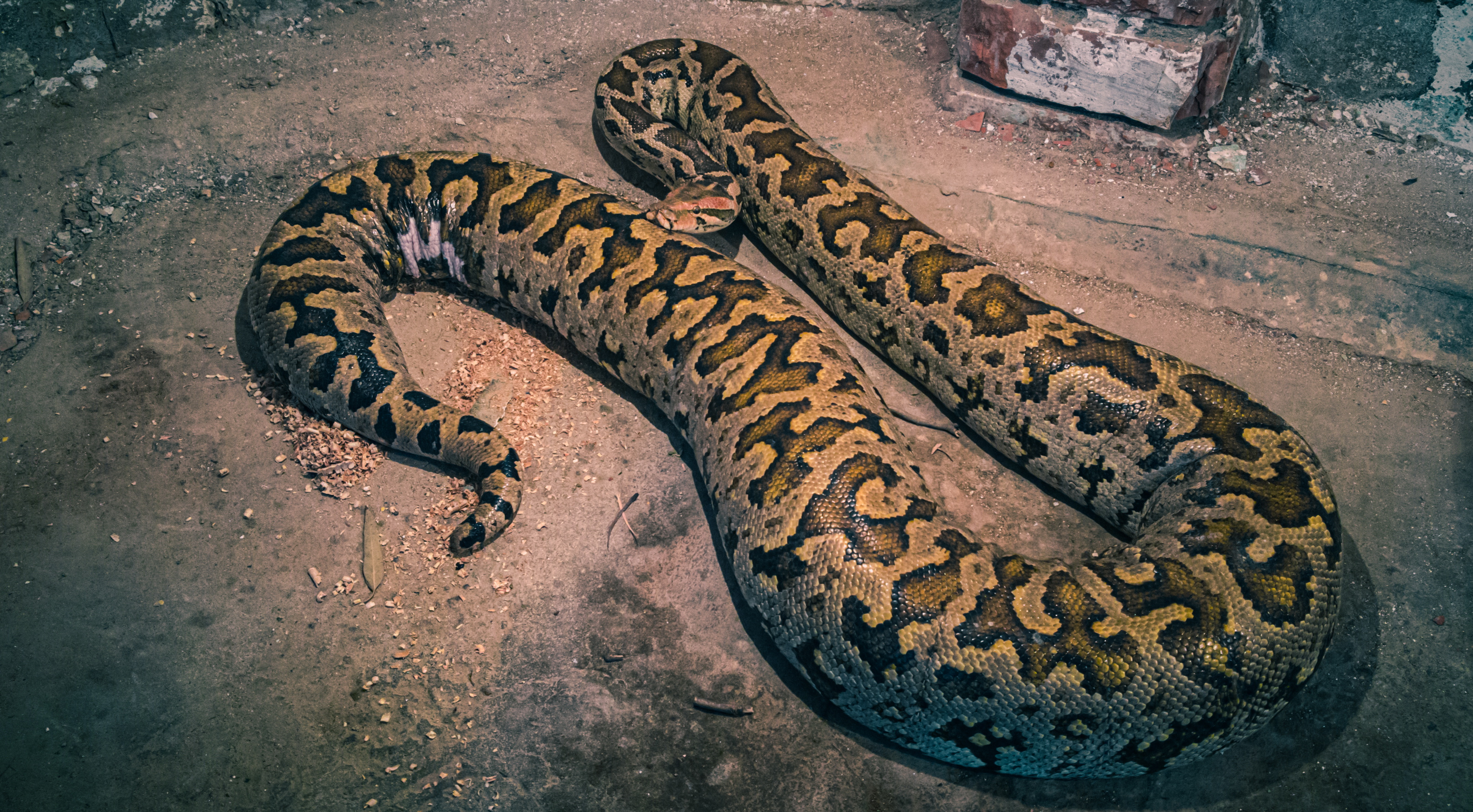
Indian python (Python molurus)

The Pythonidae, commonly known as pythons, are a family of non-venomous snakes found in Africa, Asia, and Australia. Among its members are some of the largest snakes in the world. Ten genera and 39 species are currently recognized. Being naturally non-venomous, pythons must constrict their prey to induce cardiac arrest prior to consumption. Pythons will typically strike at and bite their prey of choice to gain hold of it; they then must use physical strength to constrict their prey, by coiling their muscular bodies around the animal, effectively suffocating it before swallowing whole. This is in stark contrast to venomous snakes such as the rattlesnake, for example, which delivers a swift, venomous bite but releases, waiting as the prey succumbs to envenomation before being consumed. Collectively, the pythons are well-documented and studied as constrictors, much like other non-venomous snakes, including the boas and even kingsnakes of the New World.

Pythons are indigenous to the tropics of the Old World, including sub-Saharan Africa, subtropical to tropical Asia, and Australia, Pythons are ambush predators that primarily kill prey by constriction, causing cardiac arrest. Pythons are oviparous, laying eggs that females incubate until they hatch. They possess premaxillary teeth, with the exception of adults in the Australian genus Aspidites. While many species are available in the exotic pet trade, caution is needed with larger species due to potential danger. The taxonomy of pythons has evolved, and they are now known to be more closely related to sunbeam snakes and the Mexican burrowing python.

Pythons are frequently poached for their skins, with the export market for skins from Southeast Asia estimated at a billion dollars in 2012. They are also sold and consumed as meat. They can carry diseases, such as salmonella and leptospirosis, which can be transmitted to humans. Pythons are also used in African traditional medicine to treat ailments like rheumatism and mental illnesses. Their body parts, including blood and organs, are believed to have various healing properties. In some African cultures, pythons have significant roles in folklore and mythology, often symbolizing strength or having sacred status.

== Distribution and habitat ==
Pythons are found in sub-Saharan Africa, much of South Asia, Southeast Asia, southern China, the Philippines and Australia.

=== Invasive populations ===
Two known populations of invasive pythons exist in the Western Hemisphere.

In the United States, an introduced population of Burmese pythons (Python bivittatus) has existed as an invasive species in Everglades National Park since the late 1990s. As of January 2023, estimates place the Floridian Burmese python population at around half a million. Local bounties are awarded and scientists study dead Burmese pythons to better understand breeding cycles and trends associated with rapid population explosion. The pythons readily prey on native North American fauna in Florida, including (but not limited to) American alligators, birds, bobcats, American bullfrogs, opossums, raccoons, river otters, white-tailed deer, and occasionally domestic pets and livestock. They are also known to prey on other invasive and introduced animals to Florida, such as the green iguana and nutria (coypu), though not at a rate as to lower their numbers rapidly or effectively.

In Puerto Rico, a population of reticulated pythons (Malayopython reticulatus) are known to be currently established, with a remarkably high rate of albinism, suggesting establishment from domesticated pet stock. Records of reticulated pythons date back to as early as 2009, and the population was recognized as established by 2017.

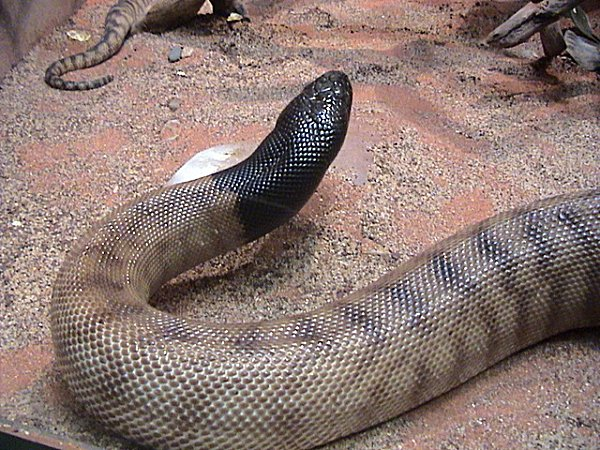
Black-headed python (Aspidites melanocephalus)

== Conservation ==
Many species have been hunted aggressively, which has greatly reduced the population of some, such as the Indian python (Python molurus) and the ball python (Python regius).

== Behavior ==
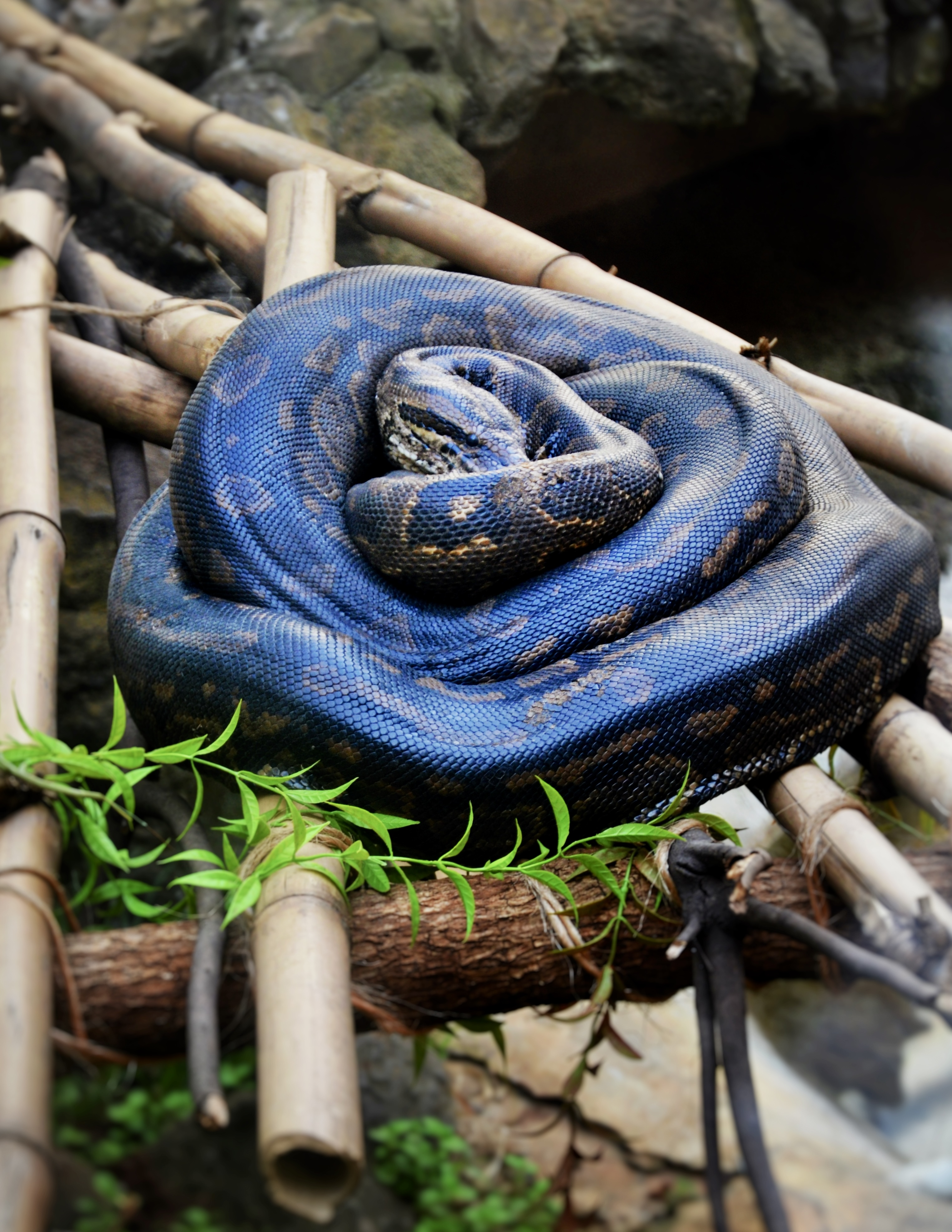
Reticulated python (Malayopython reticulatus) at Nairobi National Museum, Kenya

Most members of this family are ambush predators, in that they typically remain motionless in a camouflaged position, and then strike suddenly at passing prey. Because pythons are often active at night or hunting in dense foliage, most species rely on specialized heat-sensing pits (labial pits) located along their jaws to detect the infrared radiation of warm-blooded animals in complete darkness. When navigating their environment, pythons typically move using rectilinear progression; rather than slithering from side to side, they use their ventral belly scales and stiffened ribs to push themselves forward in a slow, straight line. Defensively, when threatened or attacked by predators, some species will resort to coiling their bodies into a tight ball with their head tucked safely in the center—a behavior most famously associated with the ball python (Python regius). Attacks on humans, although known to occur, are extremely rare.

== Feeding ==
Pythons use their sharp, backward-curving teeth, four rows in the upper jaw, two in the lower, to grasp prey which is then killed by constriction; after an animal has been grasped to restrain it, the python quickly wraps a number of coils around it. Death occurs primarily by cardiac arrest. Even the larger species, such as the reticulated python (Malayopython reticulatus), do not crush their prey to death.

Larger specimens usually eat animals about the size of a domestic cat, but larger food items are known: some large Asian species have been known to take down adult deer, and the Central African rock python (Python sebae) and the Southern African rock python (Python natalensis) have been known to eat antelope. The reticulated python is the only python species known to sometimes eat humans in its natural habitat in Sulawesi, Indonesia. All prey is swallowed whole, and may take several days or even weeks to fully digest.

A python skull

== Reproduction ==
Pythons are oviparous. This sets them apart from the family Boidae (boas), most of which bear live young (ovoviviparous). After they lay their eggs, females typically incubate them until they hatch. This is achieved by causing the muscles to "shiver", which raises the temperature of the body to a certain degree, and thus that of the eggs. Keeping the eggs at a constant temperature is essential for healthy embryo development. During the incubation period, females do not eat and leave only to bask to raise their body temperature.

== Captivity ==
Most species in this family are available in the exotic pet trade. However, caution must be exercised with the larger species, as they can be dangerous; rare cases of large specimens killing their owners have been documented.

== Taxonomy ==
Obsolete classification schemes—such as that of Boulenger (1890)—place pythons in Pythoninae, a subfamily of the boa family, Boidae. However, despite a superficial resemblance to boas, pythons are more closely related to the sunbeam snakes (Xenopeltis) and the Mexican burrowing python (Loxocemus).

=== Genera ===
Genus	Taxon author	Species	Subsp. (Note: Not including the nominate subspecies.)	Common name	Geographic range
Antaresia	Wells & Wellington, 1984	4	2	Children's pythons	Australia in arid and tropical regions
Apodora	Kluge, 1993	1	0	Papuan python	Papua New Guinea
Aspidites	W. Peters, 1877	2	0	pitless pythons	Australia, except in the southern parts of the country
Bothrochilus	Fitzinger, 1843	1	0	Bismarck ringed python	the Bismarck Archipelago
Leiopython	Hubrecht, 1879	3	0	white-lipped pythons	Papua New Guinea
Liasis	Gray, 1842	3	5	water pythons	Indonesia in the Lesser Sunda Islands, east through New Guinea and northern and western Australia
Malayopython	Reynolds, 2014	2	3	reticulated and Timor pythons	from India to Timor
Morelia	Gray, 1842	6	7	tree pythons	from Indonesia in the Maluku Islands, east through New Guinea, including the Bismarck Archipelago, and Australia
Nyctophilopython	Gow, 1977	1	0	Oenpelli python	the Northern Territory, Australia
Python (Note: Type genus.)	Daudin, 1803	10	1	true pythons	Africa in the tropics south of the Sahara Desert (not including southern and extreme southwestern Madagascar), Bangladesh, Pakistan, India, Sri Lanka, the Nicobar Islands, Burma, Indochina, southern China, Hong Kong, Hainan, the Malayan region of Indonesia and the Philippines
Simalia	Gray, 1849	6	0	amethystine python species complex	found in Indonesia (Including the islands of Halmahera, Ambon, Seram, Maluku), the Northern Territory, northeastern Queensland into the Torres Strait, and Papua New Guinea

=== Extant species ===
Between the 10-11 recognized genera, there are approximately 39 extant (living) species of python, which are:

Genus Antaresia

Species marked with † are extinct

- A. childreni, Children’s python
- A. maculosa, Spotted python
- A. papuensis, Papuan spotted python
- A. perthensis, Pygmy python

Genus Apodora

- A. papuana, Papuan python

Genus Aspidites

- A. melanocephalus, Black-headed python
- A. ramsayi, Woma python

Genus Bothrochilus

- B. boa, Bismarck ringed python

Genus Leiopython

- L. albertisii, D'Albertis' python, Northern white-lipped python
- L. fredparkeri, Karimui Basin white-lipped python, Southern white-lipped python
- L. biakensis, Biak white-lipped python

Genus Liasis

- L. fuscus, Water python
- L. mackloti, Macklot's python, Freckled python
- L. olivaceus, Olive python

Genus Malayopython

- M. reticulatus, Reticulated python
- M. timoriensis, Timor python

Genus Morelia

- M. azurea, Northern green tree python
- M. bredli, Bredl’s python
- M. carinata, Rough-scaled python
- M. imbricata, Southwestern carpet python
- M. spilota, Carpet python, Diamond python
- M. viridis, Green tree python, Southern green tree python
  - †M. riversleighensis

Genus Nyctophilopython

- N. oenpelliensis, Oenpelli python

Genus Python

- P. molurus, Indian python, Indian rock python
- P. sebae, Central African rock python, African rock python
- P. regius, Ball python, Royal python
- P. bivittatus, Burmese python
- P. natalensis, Southern African rock python, Natal rock python
- P. curtus, Sumatran short-tailed python
- P. breitensteini, Borneo short-tailed python, Borneo python
- P. anchietae, Angolan python, Anchieta's dwarf python
- P. brongersmai, Blood python
- P. kyaiktiyo, Myanmar short-tailed python
  - †P. europaeus

Genus Simalia

- S. amethistina, Amethystine python, Scrub python
- S. boeleni, Boelen’s python
- S. clastolepis, Moluccan python, Yellow python
- S. kinghorni, Australian scrub python, Kinghorn's python
- S. nauta, Tanimbar python
- S. tracyae, Halmahera python

== Relationship with humans ==
=== Skin and meat trade ===
Trade in python skins is a lucrative business with the export market from Southeast Asia estimated at US$1 billion as of 2012. Much of the trade is illegal, and python farming is very expensive. Pythons are poached for their meat, mostly consumed locally as bushmeat, and their skin, which is sent to Europe and North America for manufacture of accessories like bags, belts and shoes.

In Cameroon bushmeat markets, the Central African rock python (Python sebae) is sold for meat. Hunting, killing and selling pythons is illegal in Cameroon under national wildlife law, but there is little to no enforcement.

=== Pythons and human health ===
Pythons are not venomous, but like other reptiles, they can be vectors for infections that affect humans, such as salmonella. Such diseases may be transmitted to humans through excreted waste, open wounds, and contaminated water.

Pythons are also integrated into some aspects of African health and belief use, often with the added risk of contacting zoonotic diseases. Python bodies and blood are used for African traditional medicines and other belief uses as well, one in-depth study of all animals used by the Yorubas of Nigeria for traditional medicine found that the African Python is used to cure rheumatism, snake poison, appeasing witches, and accident prevention.

Python habitats, diets, and invasion into new areas also impact human health and prosperity. A University of Florida Institute of Food and Agricultural Sciences study found that the Burmese python, as an invasive species, enters new habitats and eats an increasing number of mammals, leaving limited species for mosquitoes to bite, forcing them to bite disease-carrying hispid cotton rats and then infect humans with the Everglades virus, a dangerous infection that is carried by very few animals. While direct human-python interactions can be potentially dangerous, the risk of zoonotic diseases is always a concern, whether considering medical and belief use in Nigeria or when addressing invasive species impacts in Florida. In 2022, a woman who lived near a lake area in south-eastern New South Wales was found to be infested with the Ophidascaris robertsi roundworm which is common in carpet pythons, non-venomous snakes found across much of Australia.

=== Traditional use ===
==== Skin ====
Python skin has traditionally been used as the attire of choice for medicine men and healers. Typically, Zulu traditional healers in South Africa will use python skin in ceremonial regalia. Pythons are viewed by the Zulu tradition to be a sign of power. Healers are seen as all-powerful since they have a wealth of knowledge, as well as accessibility to the ancestors.

==== Fat ====
Typically, species are attributed to healing various ailments based on their likeliness to a specific bodily attribute. For example, in many cultures, the python is seen as a strong and powerful creature. As a result, pythons are often prescribed as a method of increasing strength. It is very common for the body fat of pythons to be used to treat a large variation of issues such as joint pain, rheumatic pain, toothache and visual impairment. Additionally, python fat has been used to treat those suffering from mental illnesses like psychosis. Their calm nature is thought to be of use to treat combative patients. The fat of the python is rubbed onto the body part that is in pain. To improve mental illnesses, it is often rubbed on the temple. The existence of evidence for genuine anti-inflammatory and antimicrobial properties of the refined 'snake oil' is ironic with respect to the expression "snake oil salesman".

==== Feces ====
The Sukuma people of Tanzania have been known to use python feces in order to treat back pain. The feces are frequently mixed with a little water, placed on the back, and left for two to three days.

==== Organs ====
In Nigeria, the gallbladder and liver of a python are used to treat poison or bites from other snakes. The python head has been used to "appease witches". Many traditional African cultures believe that they can be cursed by witches. In order to reverse spells and bad luck, traditional doctors will prescribe python heads.

== Folklore ==
In northwestern Ghana, people see pythons as a savior and have taboos to prevent the snake from being harmed or eaten. Their folklore states that this is because a python once helped them flee from their enemies by transforming into a log to allow them to cross a river.

In Benin, Vodun practitioners believe that pythons symbolize strength and the spirit of Dagbe ["to do good" in Yoruba]. Annually, people sacrifice animals and proclaim their sins to pythons that are kept inside temples.

== See also ==
- List of pythonid species and subspecies
- Python
