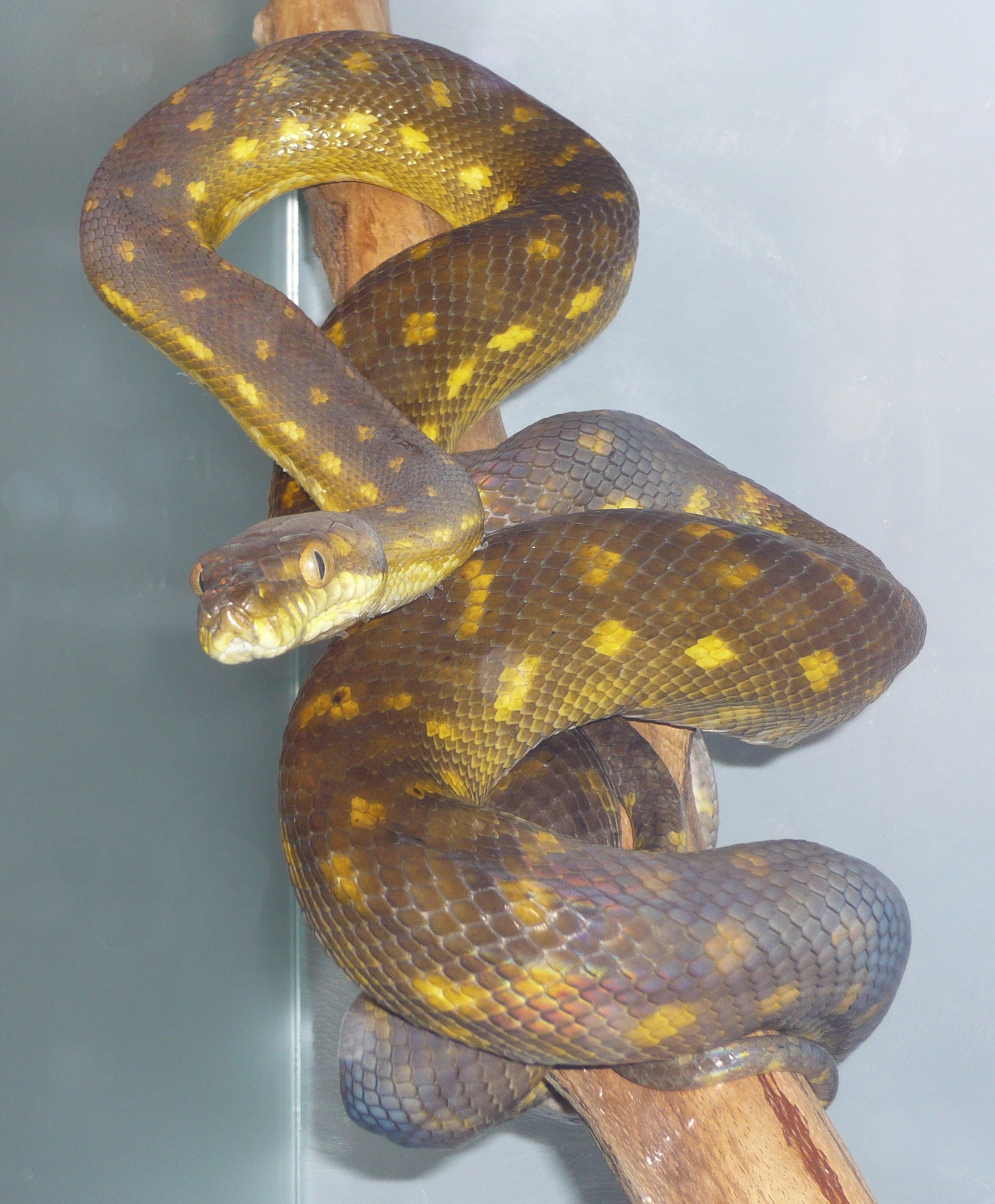

Scientific classification
- Kingdom: Animalia
- Phylum: Chordata
- Class: Reptilia
- Order: Squamata
- Suborder: Serpentes
- Family: Pythonidae
- Genus: Simalia
- Species: S. nauta

Binomial name
- Simalia nauta (Harvey, Barker, Ammerman & Chippindale, 2000)

= Simalia nauta =

Species of snake

Simalia nauta, commonly known as the Tanimbar python, is a species of snake of the family Pythonidae.

== Geographic range ==
The species is found in Indonesia.
