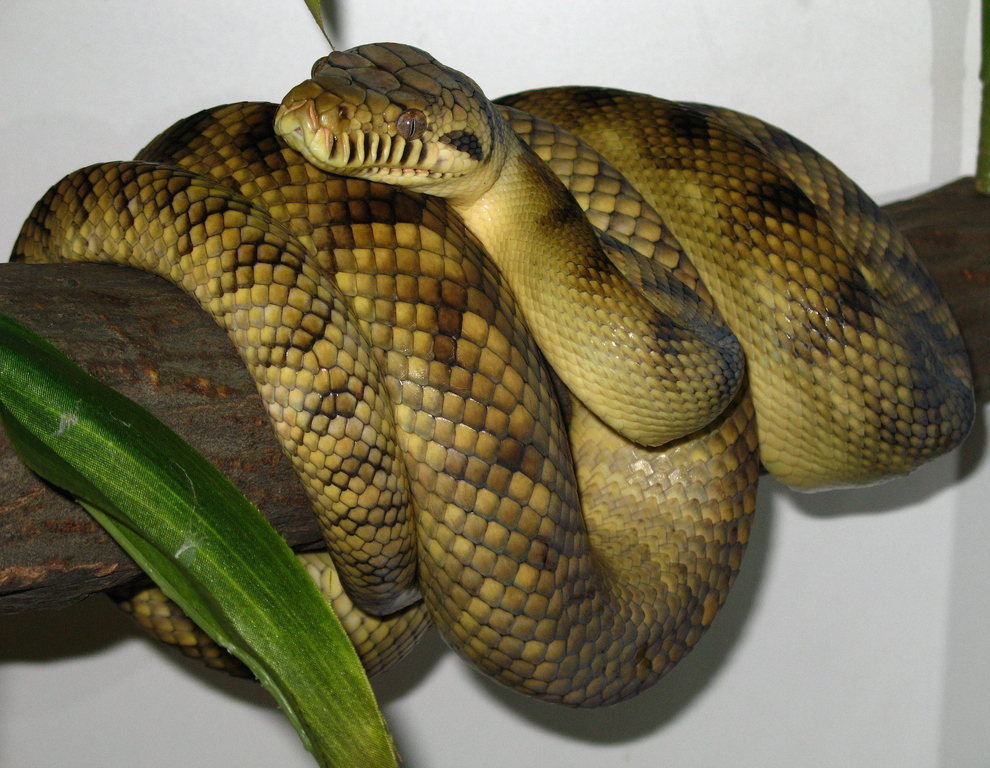
- Adult High-Yellow Sorong Amethystine Scrub Python

Scientific classification
- Kingdom: Animalia
- Phylum: Chordata
- Class: Reptilia
- Order: Squamata
- Suborder: Serpentes
- Family: Pythonidae
- Genus: Simalia; Gray, 1849

Type species
- Simalia amethistina

= Simalia =

Genus of snakes

Simalia is a genus of snakes in the family Pythonidae.

== Taxonomy ==
Simalia Gray, 1849, was considered a taxonomic synonym of

- Liasis (a genus of non-venomous pythons found in Indonesia, New Guinea and Australia) and
- Morelia (a genus of large snakes, in the family Pythonidae, found in Australia, Indonesia and New Guinea),

but Reynolds et al. (2014) resurrected the genus for the Morelia amethistina species group (which, together with Morelia viridis, had made the genus Morelia paraphyletic).

== Species ==
The genus Simalia contains the following species:

Image	Species	Distribution
	S. amethistina (Schneider, 1801) (type species)	Indonesia, Papua New Guinea
	S. boeleni (Brongersma, 1953)	New Guinea
	S. clastolepis (Harvey et al., 2000)	Indonesia
	S. kinghorni (Stull, 1933)	northern Australia
	S. nauta (Harvey et al., 2000)	Indonesia
	S. tracyae (Harvey et al., 2000)	Indonesian island of Halmahera

As of June 2022, ITIS and the IUCN Red List identify the Oenpelli python as Simalia oenpelliensis, while The Reptile Database places it in the monotypic genus Nyctophilopython.

Nota bene: A binomial authority in parentheses indicates that the species was originally described in a genus other than Simalia.
