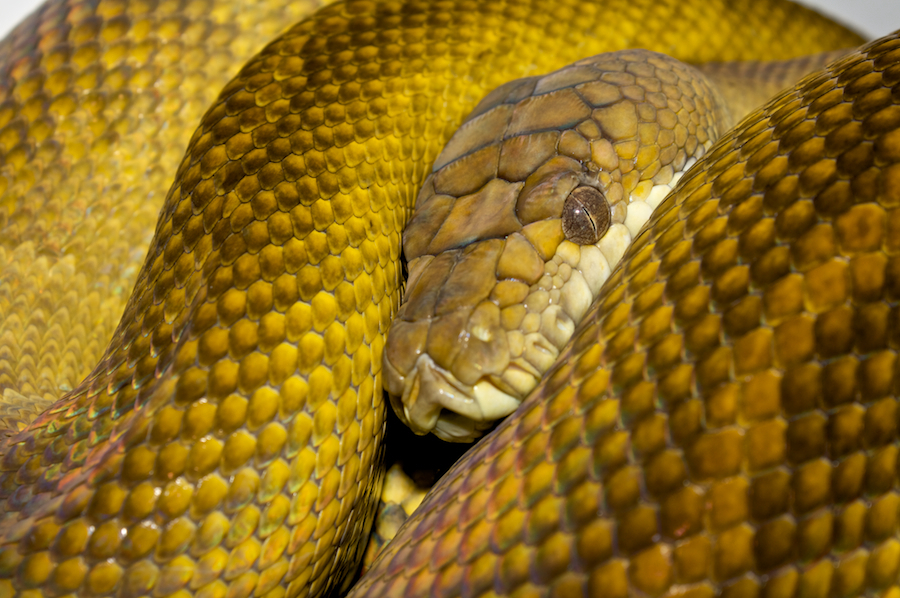

Conservation status
- Near Threatened (IUCN 3.1)

Scientific classification
- Kingdom: Animalia
- Phylum: Chordata
- Class: Reptilia
- Order: Squamata
- Suborder: Serpentes
- Family: Pythonidae
- Genus: Simalia
- Species: S. clastolepis

Binomial name
- Simalia clastolepis (Harvey, Barker, Ammerman & Chippindale, 2000)

= Simalia clastolepis =

Moluccan python

Species of snake

Simalia clastolepis, also known as the Moluccan python or yellow python, is a species of python found in Indonesia in dense forests of the islands on Ambon and Seram in Maluku. They can grow to be 8–9 feet in length.

== Description ==
As hatchlings they have a red in color, which then turns from brown to yellow, then as adults, will get black along their spine. They can also be patternless or striped.
