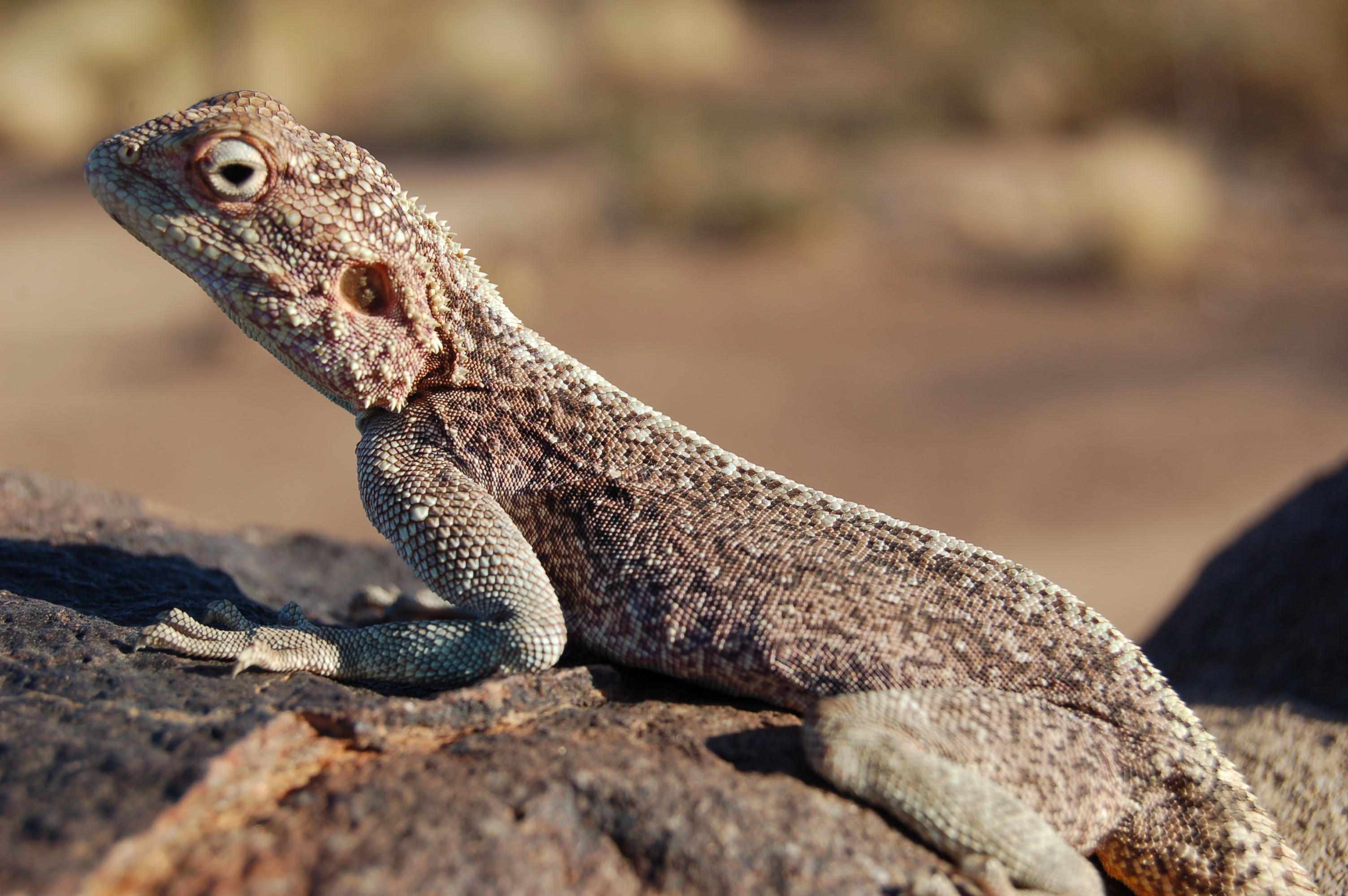
- A. anchietae in Namibia
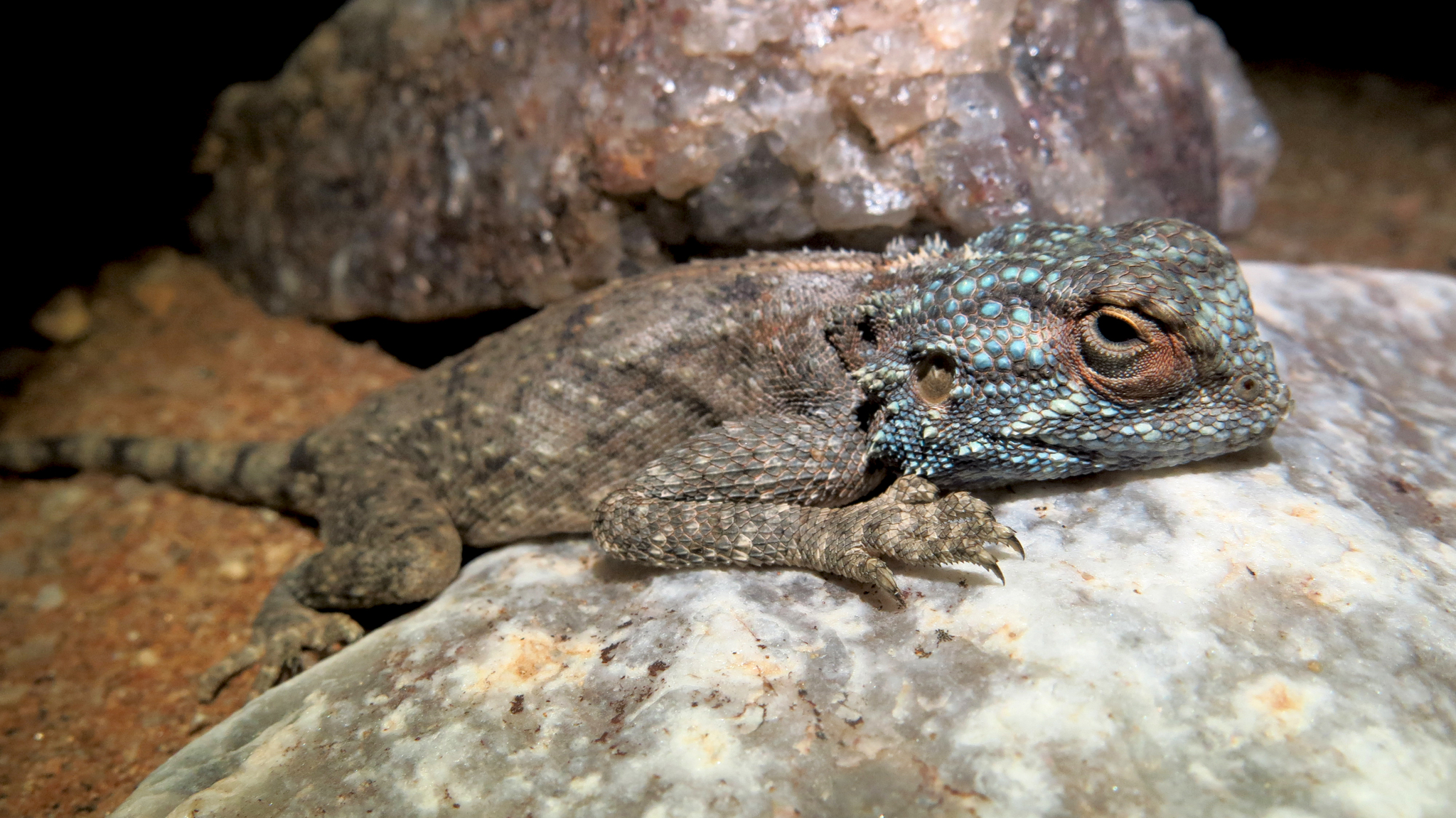
- In South Africa

Conservation status
- Least Concern (IUCN 3.1)

Scientific classification
- Kingdom: Animalia
- Phylum: Chordata
- Class: Reptilia
- Order: Squamata
- Suborder: Iguania
- Family: Agamidae
- Genus: Agama
- Species: A. anchietae

Binomial name
- Agama anchietae Bocage, 1896

= Agama anchietae =

Species of lizard

Agama anchietae, also known commonly as Anchieta's agama and the western rock agama, is a species of lizard in the family Agamidae. The species is native to southern Africa.

== Etymology ==
The specific name, anchietae, is in honor of Portuguese naturalist José Alberto de Oliveira Anchieta, who was an explorer of Africa.

== Geographic range ==
A. anchietae is found in Angola, Botswana, Congo, Namibia, and South Africa.

== Habitat ==
A. anchietae is found in a variety of habitats including desert, shrubland, and grassland.

== Diet ==
The diet of A. anchietae consists of insects (primarily ants).

== Description ==
A. anchietae shows signs of sexual dimorphism. Males tend to have a wider head and a longer tail than females. This species is one of the more cryptically coloured members of the genus Agama, as opposed to the more colourful species such as Agama planiceps. This is associated with its relatively solitary lifestyle; colourful species such as A. planiceps are comparatively much more social.

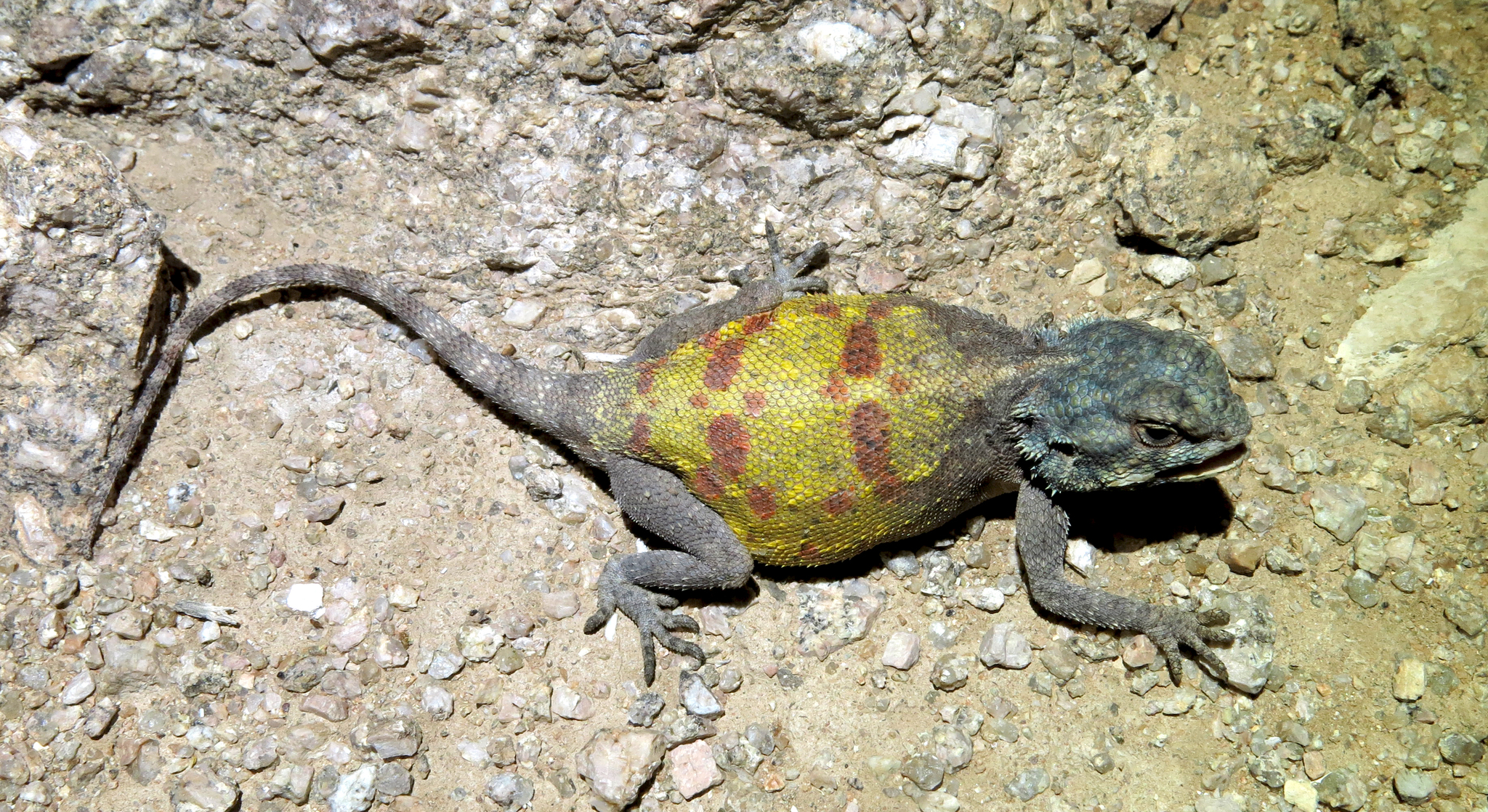
Dorsal side

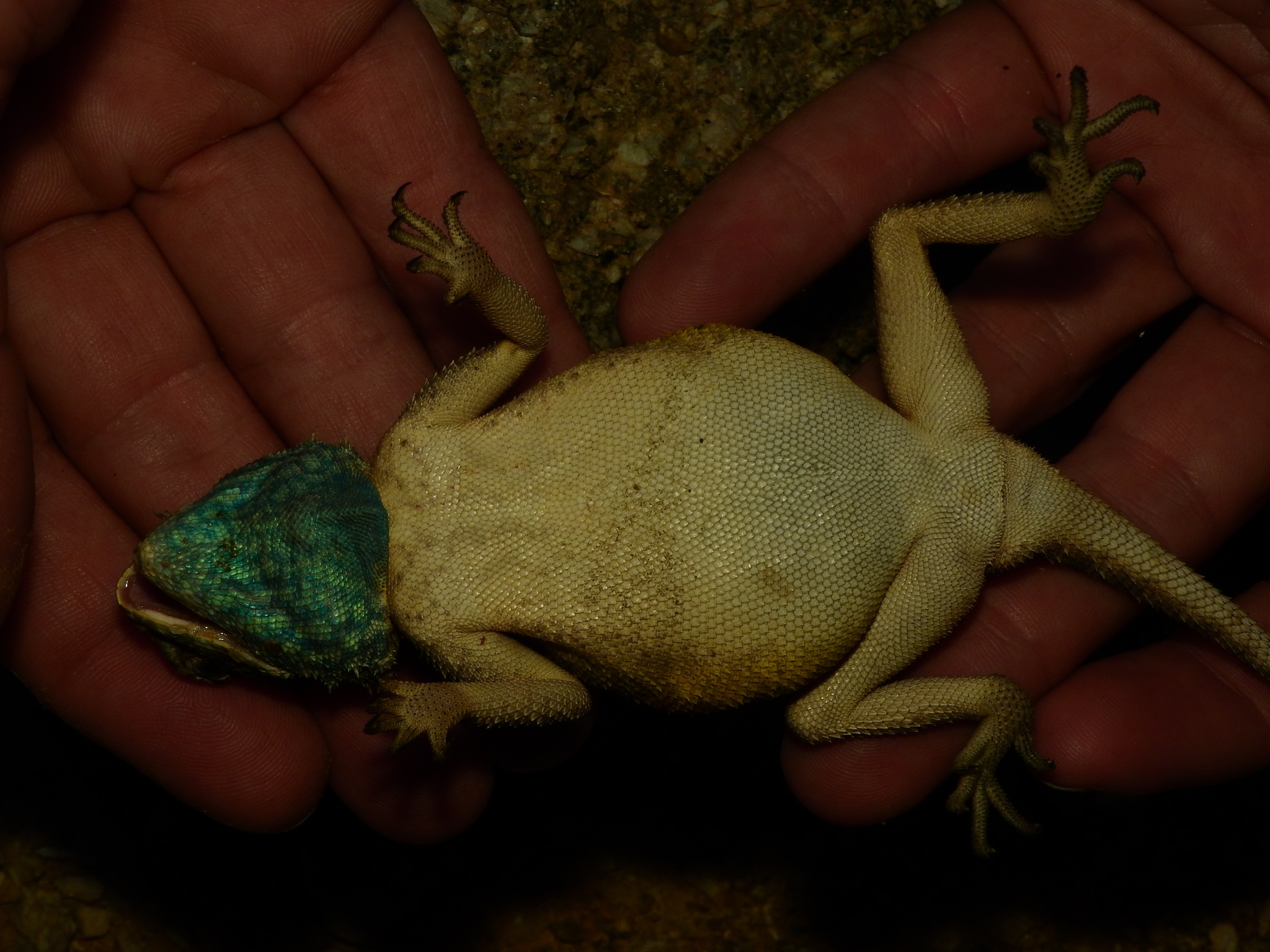
Ventral side

== Reproduction ==
A. anchietae is oviparous.
