= Anchieta's frog =

Anchieta's frog may refer to:

- Anchieta's ridged frog (Ptychadena anchietae), a frog in the family Ptychadenidae found in Africa
- Anchieta's tree frog (Leptopelis anchietae), a frog in the family Hyperoliidae endemic to Angola
