= Eumecia anchietae =

Conservation status
- Least Concern (IUCN 3.1)

Scientific classification
- Kingdom: Animalia
- Phylum: Chordata
- Class: Reptilia
- Order: Squamata
- Family: Scincidae
- Genus: Eumecia
- Species: E. anchietae

Binomial name
- Eumecia anchietae Bocage, 1870

Synonyms
- Eumecia anchietae Bocage, 1870; Lygosoma (Riopa) anchietae — Boulenger, 1887; Lygosoma anchietae — Sternfeld, 1911; Riopa (Eumecia) anchietae — M.A. Smith, 1937; Riopa anchietae — Loveridge, 1953; Eumecia anchietae — Laurent 1964

Species of lizard

Eumecia anchietae, also known commonly as Anchieta's serpentiform skink, Anchieta's snake skink, and the western serpentiform skink, is a species of lizard in the family Scincidae. The species is endemic to Africa. There are three recognized subspecies.

== Etymology ==
The specific name, anchietae, is in honor of Portuguese naturalist José Alberto de Oliveira Anchieta, who was an explorer of Africa.

== Geographic range ==
E. anchietae is found in Angola, the Democratic Republic of the Congo, Kenya, Tanzania, and Zambia.

== Habitat ==
The preferred natural habitats of E. anchietae are grassland and savanna at altitudes of 1,000–2,000 m (3,300–6,600 ft).

== Description ==
The limbs of E. anchietae are very reduced. The front legs are minute, each with two toes. The hind legs are twice as large (but still very small), each with three toes. The body and tail are subcylindrical and elongate.

== Behavior ==
E. anchietae is diurnal and terrestrial.

== Reproduction ==
E. anchietae is viviparous.

== Subspecies ==
Three subspecies are recognized as being valid, including the nominotypical subspecies.

- Eumecia anchietae anchietae Bocage, 1870
- Eumecia anchietae major Laurent, 1964 – Lunda western snake skink
- Eumecia anchietae wittei Laurent, 1964
