= José Alberto de Oliveira Anchieta =

Portuguese explorer and naturalist

- Born: 9 October 1832; Lisbon, Kingdom of Portugal
- Died: 14 September 1897 (aged 64); Caconda, Portuguese Angola
- Education: University of Coimbra, Escola Politécnica de Lisboa
- Occupation(s): Explorer, naturalist
- Known for: Identifying new species of mammals, birds, amphibia and reptiles

José Alberto de Oliveira Anchieta (variations José d'Anchieta, José Anchieta, José de Anchieta - b. October 9, 1832 in Lisbon, Kingdom of Portugal, d. September 14, 1897 in Caconda, Portuguese Angola) was a 19th-century Portuguese explorer and naturalist who, between 1866 and 1897, travelled extensively in Portuguese Angola, Africa, collecting animals and plants. His specimens from Angola and Mozambique were sent out to Portugal, where they were later examined by several zoologists and botanists, chiefly among them J.V. Barboza du Bocage.

== Life ==
Anchieta was born in 1832, in Lisbon, and started his studies in mathematics at the University of Coimbra. Due to his fierce independence and eccentric character, however, he did not adapt well and moved to the Escola Politécnica de Lisboa (Polytechnic School of Lisbon). In 1857, one of his closest friends moved to Portuguese Cape Verde, a Portuguese colony and a group of islands in the Atlantic Ocean in West Africa, and Anchieta went to join him. He spent his time studying the local flora and fauna in the island of Santo Antão, and finally ended up helping the local inhabitants as an amateur physician (he had studied some medicine). A cholera epidemic killed most of the inhabitants and he almost died too, but he was able to return to Portugal after two years. Following what he thought was his vocation, he studied medicine in Lisbon, London and Paris, but could not complete the course, and returned to Africa again, this time to Angola, one of the largest West African Portuguese colonies. He was successful as an explorer of the hinterland and as a naturalist, and after studying and collecting many new animal and plant species, he returned to Portugal. Most of his collections were lost when his canoe foundered in a river, but he donated what remained to the natural history museum of the Polytechnic School.

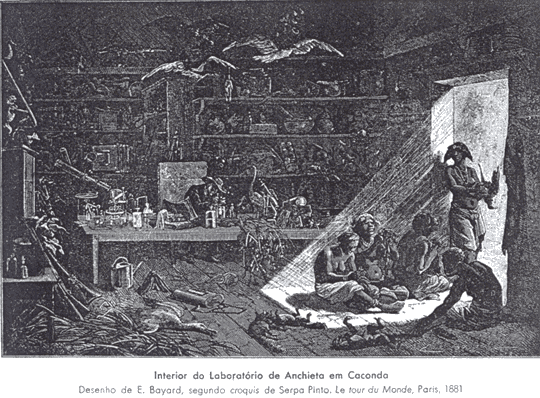
Laboratory of Anchieta in Caconda, around 1870

In 1865, he travelled back on his own once again to Angola. This time, he was married and his wife accompanied him. He stayed on his own in the region of Benguela, establishing a laboratory inside the ruins of a church, and exploring and collecting animals, until, in 1867, the Portuguese government hired him, ostensibly as a naturalist. But what is most probable is that Anchieta was recruited as a secret agent and informer in the Caconda region of Angola, one of the most extreme points of its territory. He stayed there, researching, exploring and sending many specimens and letters to his scientific correspondents in Lisbon. He also helped medically in the local hospital and was much appreciated by the population as a dedicated and humane care-giving person.

Little is known in the manner of documentation about this period of Anchieta's life, because most of the museum specimens disappeared, as well as his many letters to Bocage, in a catastrophic fire in the museum, in 1978.

Anchieta died while returning from a zoological expedition to Caconda, in 1897, at 66 years of age, probably of the chronic consequences of malaria, which he and his wife caught, and which had severely undermined his health for many years.

In all, according to Bocage, Anchieta's zoological output was truly prolific. He was responsible for identifying 25 new species of mammals, 46 birds, and 46 amphibians and reptiles. He didn't care much for writing scientific papers, though, but left this to his correspondents in Lisbon.

Many of the species of birds, amphibians, lizards, snakes, fishes and mammals collected by him were unknown and thus were named for Anchieta with the species designation anchietae. Some of them were:

- Anchieta's sunbird (Anthreptes anchietae), a bird
- Anchieta's barbet (Stactolaema anchietae), a bird
- Anchieta's tchagra (Tchagra anchietae), a bird
- Anchieta's ridged frog (Ptychadena anchietae)
- Anchieta's dune lizard (Meroles anchietae)
- Anchieta's frog (Hylambates anchietae)
- Anchieta's tree frog (Leptopelis anchietae)
- Anchieta's chameleon (Chamaeleo anchietae), a lizard
- Anchieta's cobra (Naja anchietae), a venomous snake
- Anchieta's dwarf python (Python anchietae), a non-venomous snake
- Anchieta's pipistrelle (Pipistrellus anchietai), a bat
- Anchieta's elephantfish (Mormyrus anchietae)
- Anchieta's antelope (Cephalophus anchietae)
- Anchieta's serpentiform skink (Eumecia anchietae), a lizard
- Anchieta's spade-snouted worm lizard (Monopeltis anchietae), an amphisbaenian
- Anchieta's agama (Agama anchietae), a lizard

== See also ==
- José de Anchieta (Brazilian Jesuit priest, although also a naturalist, was no kin of this one)
