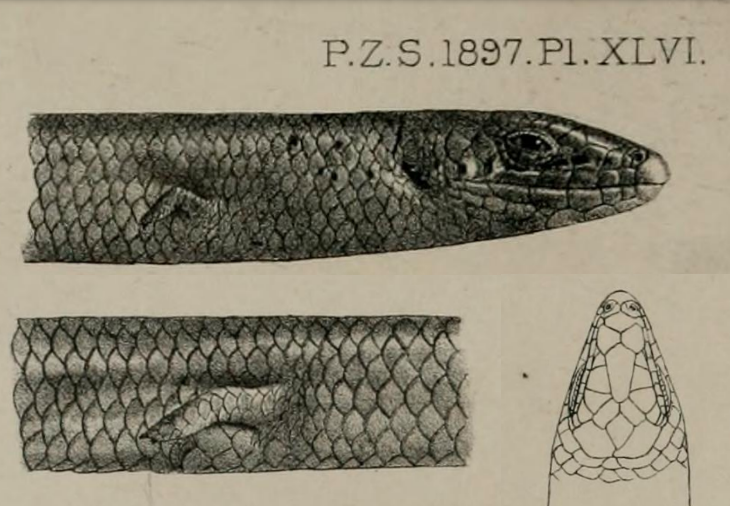

Conservation status
- Data Deficient (IUCN 3.1)

Scientific classification
- Kingdom: Animalia
- Phylum: Chordata
- Class: Reptilia
- Order: Squamata
- Suborder: Scinciformata
- Infraorder: Scincomorpha
- Family: Mabuyidae
- Genus: Eumecia
- Species: E. johnstoni

Binomial name
- Eumecia johnstoni (Boulenger, 1897)

Synonyms
- Lygosoma (Riopa) johnstoni Boulenger, 1887; Riopa (Eumecia) johnstoni – M.A. Smith; Riopa johnstoni – Loveridge, 1953

= Eumecia johnstoni =

Species of lizard

Eumecia johnstoni is a species of skink found in Malawi. It is only known from the holotype collected in 1896 from Nyika Plateau, perhaps from Livingstonia. It is named after Harry Hamilton Johnston.
