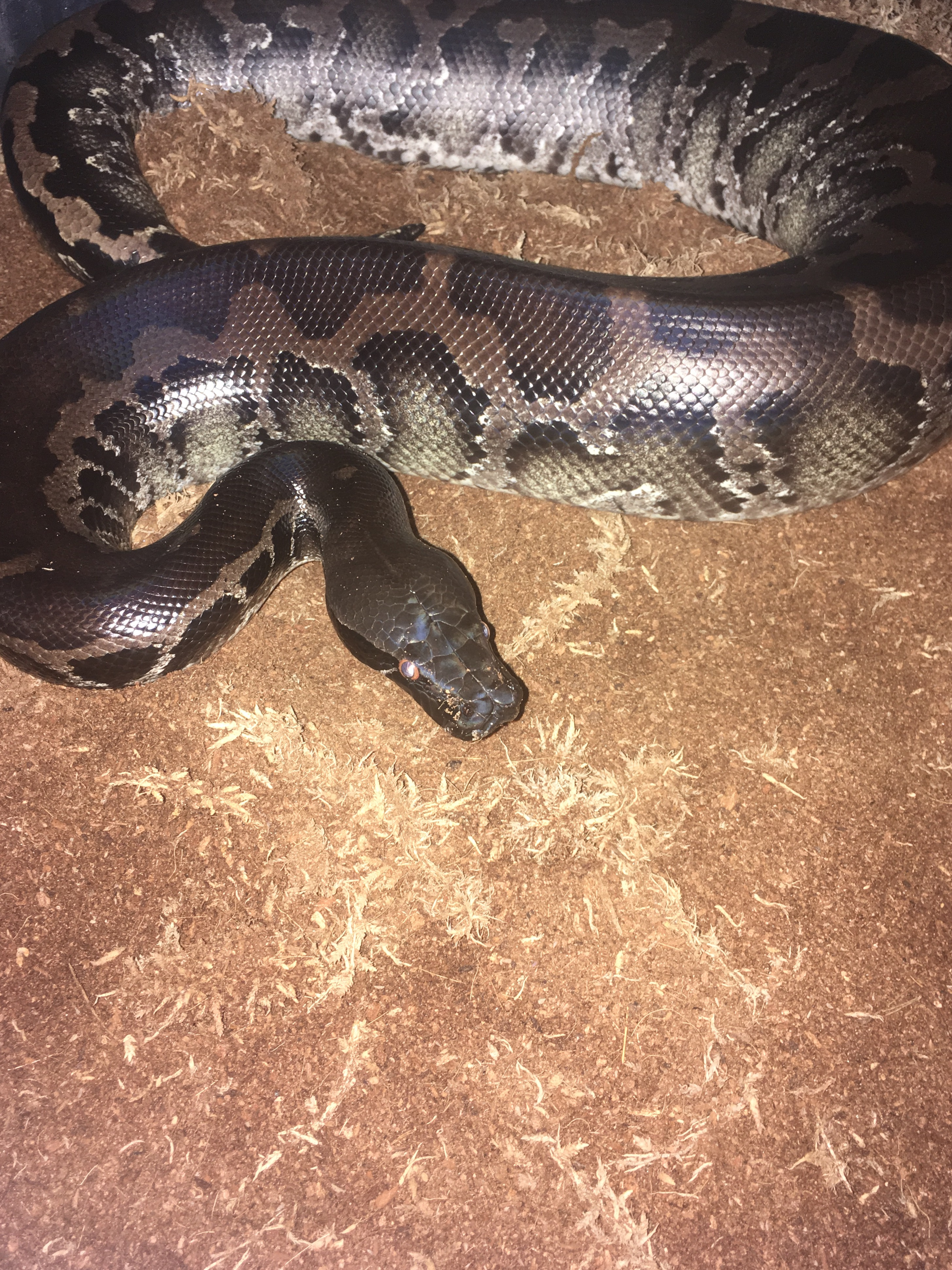

Conservation status
- Least Concern (IUCN 3.1)

Scientific classification
- Kingdom: Animalia
- Phylum: Chordata
- Class: Reptilia
- Order: Squamata
- Suborder: Serpentes
- Family: Pythonidae
- Genus: Python
- Species: P. curtus

Binomial name
- Python curtus Schlegel, 1872

Synonyms
- Aspidoboa curta Sauvage, 1884

= Sumatran short-tailed python =

Species of snake

The Sumatran short-tailed python (Python curtus), also called the Sumatra python, is a species of the family Pythonidae, a nonvenomous snake native to Sumatra.

== Taxonomy ==
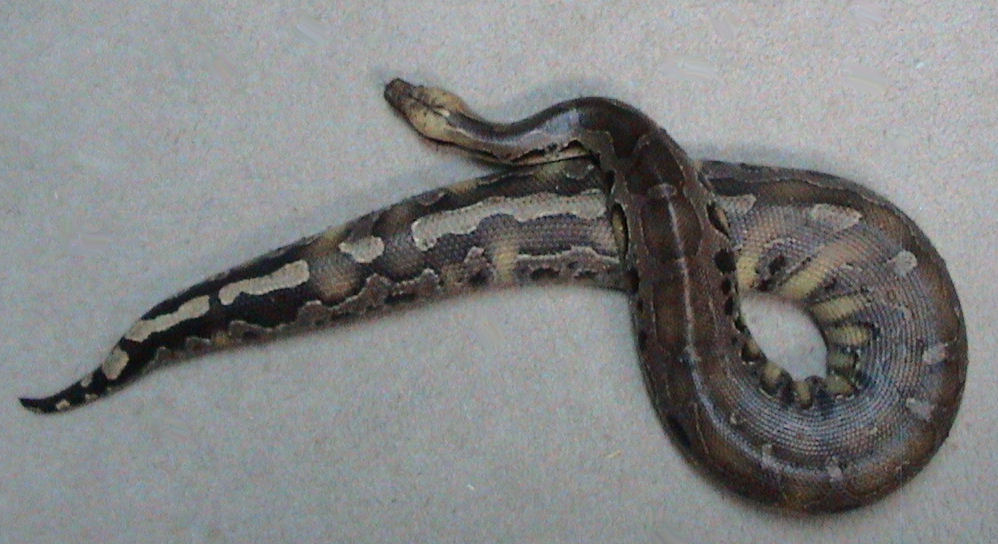
A Sumatran short-tailed python

Python curtus was the scientific name proposed by Hermann Schlegel in 1872 for a python with a short tail from Sumatra. The type locality is Sumatra.

Python brongersmai and P. breitensteini were often considered the same species as P. curtus until confirmed distinct around 2000.

== Description ==
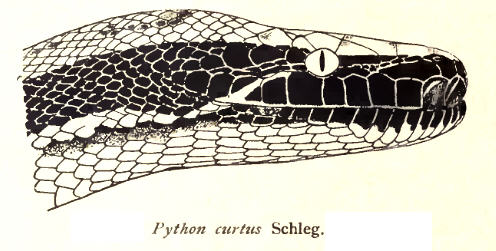
The arrangement of labial scales identify this illustration as Python brongersmai

The Sumatran short-tailed python has narrow subocular scales between the bottom of the eye and the top of the labial scales. The parietal scales do not join each other. P. curtus and P. breitensteini can be distinguished by the frontal and parietal scales on the tops of their heads. In both P. brongersmai and P. breitensteini, the parietal scales join. Adults grow to 1.1–1.5 m (3.6–4.9 ft) in length and are heavily built. The tail is extremely short relative to the overall length. The color pattern consists of a beige, tan, or grayish-brown ground color overlaid with blotches that are reddish in color.

== Distribution and habitat ==
The Sumatran short-tailed python occurs in Sumatra and Siberut. It inhabits rainforests, marshes, swamps, and the vicinity of river banks and streams.

== Behaviour and ecology ==
The Sumatran short-tailed python feeds on mammals and birds.

=== Reproduction ===
The Sumatran short-tailed python is oviparous, and females seldom lay more than a dozen large eggs. The female remains coiled around the eggs during the incubation period, and may shiver to produce heat if surrounding temperatures drop below 90 °F (32 °C). The hatchlings emerge after 2.5 to 3.0 months and are about 30 cm (12 in) long.

== Uses ==
The species is kept as an exotic pet. They are often regarded as unpredictable and aggressive, but captive-bred individuals, with proper husbandry and handling are excellent intermediate level reptiles that tend to be more docile than wild-caught specimens. These animals should only be kept by experienced reptile keepers, they are not a beginner species due to size and handling requirements.

The Sumatran short-tailed python has been extensively harvested for leather; an estimated 100,000 individuals are taken for this purpose each year. The commercial trade regards the various populations of P. curtus and P. brongersmai as a single species. Authors who elevate particular island populations to species status note that the skins are readily distinguished.
