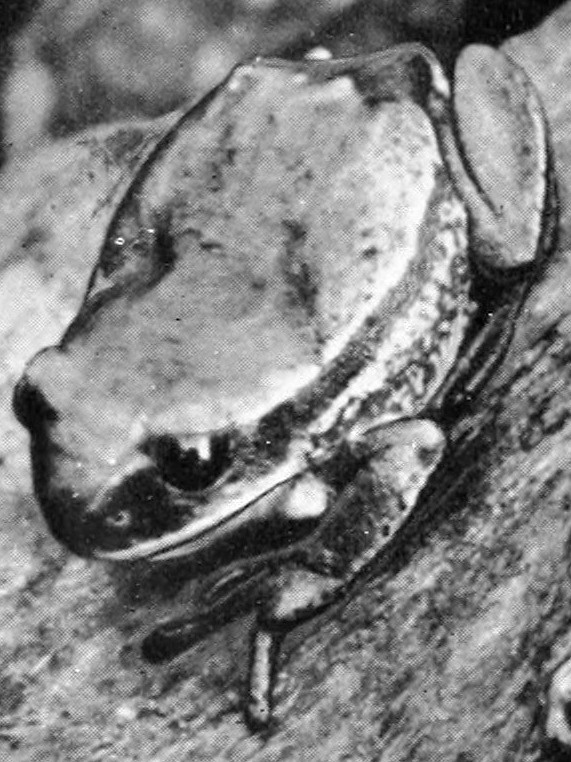

Conservation status
- Least Concern (IUCN 3.1)

Scientific classification
- Kingdom: Animalia
- Phylum: Chordata
- Class: Amphibia
- Order: Anura
- Family: Arthroleptidae
- Genus: Leptopelis
- Species: L. anchietae

Binomial name
- Leptopelis anchietae (Bocage, 1873)

= Anchieta's tree frog =

Species of frog

Anchieta's tree frog (Leptopelis anchietae), also known as the Huila forest treefrog, is a species of frog in the family Arthroleptidae. It is endemic to Angola. It is closely related to the West Cameroon forest tree frog (Leptopelis nordequatorialis, formerly Leptopelis anchietae nordequatorialis) and the Garamba forest tree frog (Leptopelis oryi).

== Description ==
Anchieta's tree frog has a brown back and legs. The legs are spotted with white spots, and the sides of its head and body are a darker brown. Male members of the species have pectoral glands; the West Cameroon forest tree frog and other members of the genus Leptopelis share this characteristic. The function of the pectoral glands is unknown, but they are made of glandules like the glandules in nuptial pads that appear on many species of amphibians. Thus, scientists speculate that the pectoral glands play a role in the frogs' mating process.

== Etymology ==
The frog was named after José Alberto de Oliveira Anchieta, a nineteenth-century Portuguese naturalist who collected many biological specimens in Angola and Mozambique, by José Vicente Barbosa du Bocage, a Portuguese zoologist who corresponded with Anchieta. Anchieta's original specimen of the frog was destroyed in a 1978 fire.

== Ecology ==
There are few records of the population range or behaviors of Anchieta's tree frog. Scientists believe that the frog is most prevalent at medium elevations of about 1000 m. Other species of Leptopelis bury their eggs in mud nests near water, so scientists suspect Anchieta's tree frog may do so as well.
