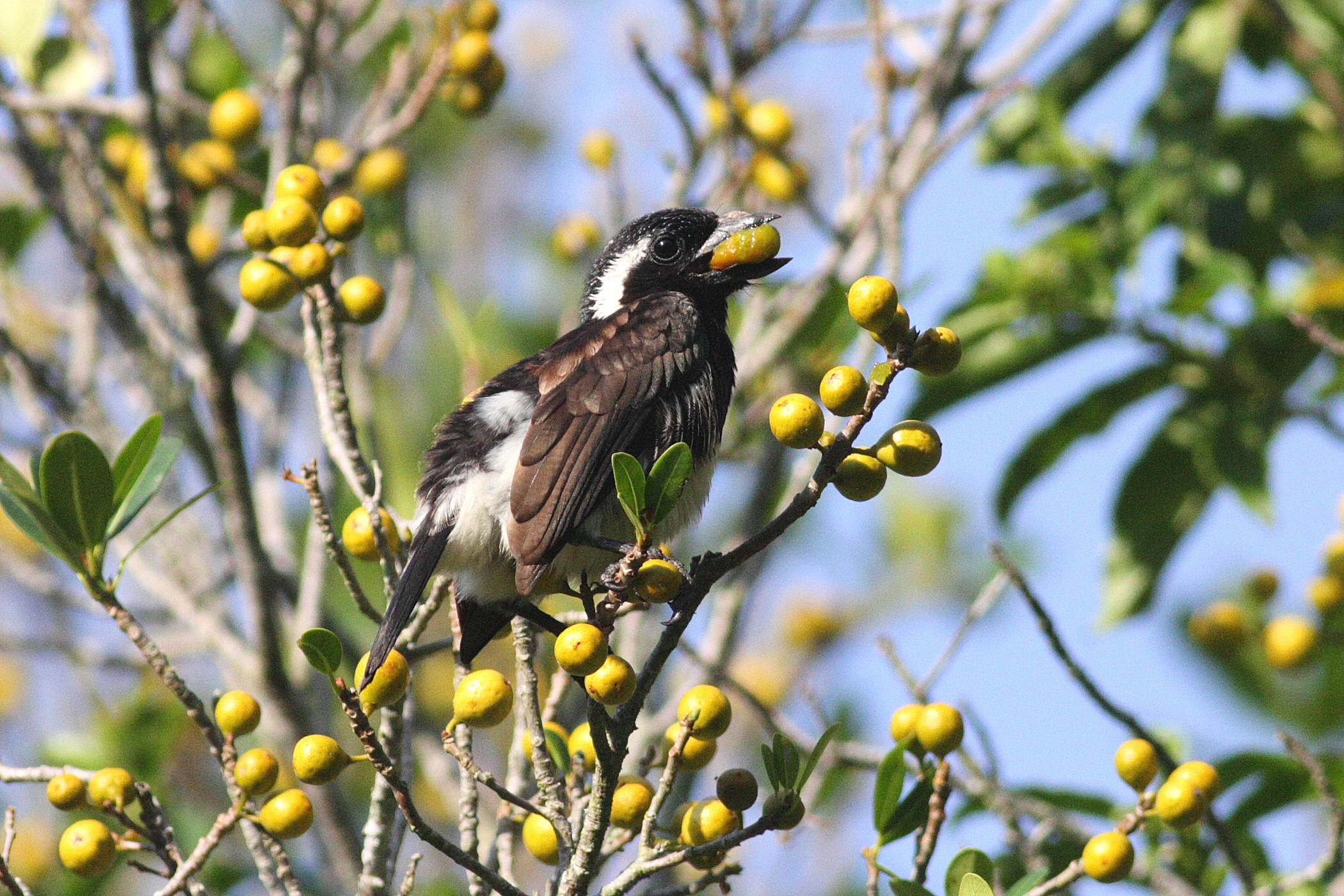
- White-eared barbet, Stactolaema leucotis

Scientific classification
- Kingdom: Animalia
- Phylum: Chordata
- Class: Aves
- Order: Piciformes
- Family: Lybiidae
- Genus: Stactolaema; Marshall & Marshall, 1870

Species
- Stactolaema anchietae Stactolaema leucotis Stactolaema olivacea Stactolaema whytii

= Stactolaema =

Genus of birds

Stactolaema is a bird genus in the African barbet family (Lybiidae) which was formerly included in the Capitonidae and sometimes in the Ramphastidae.

The genus contains three species:

Image	Scientific name	Common name	Distribution
	Stactolaema leucotis	White-eared barbet	Kenya, Malawi, Mozambique, South Africa, Swaziland, Tanzania, and Zimbabwe.
	Stactolaema anchietae	Anchieta's barbet	Angola, Democratic Republic of the Congo, and Zambia.
	Stactolaema whytii	Whyte's barbet	Malawi, Mozambique, Tanzania, Zambia, and Zimbabwe.
