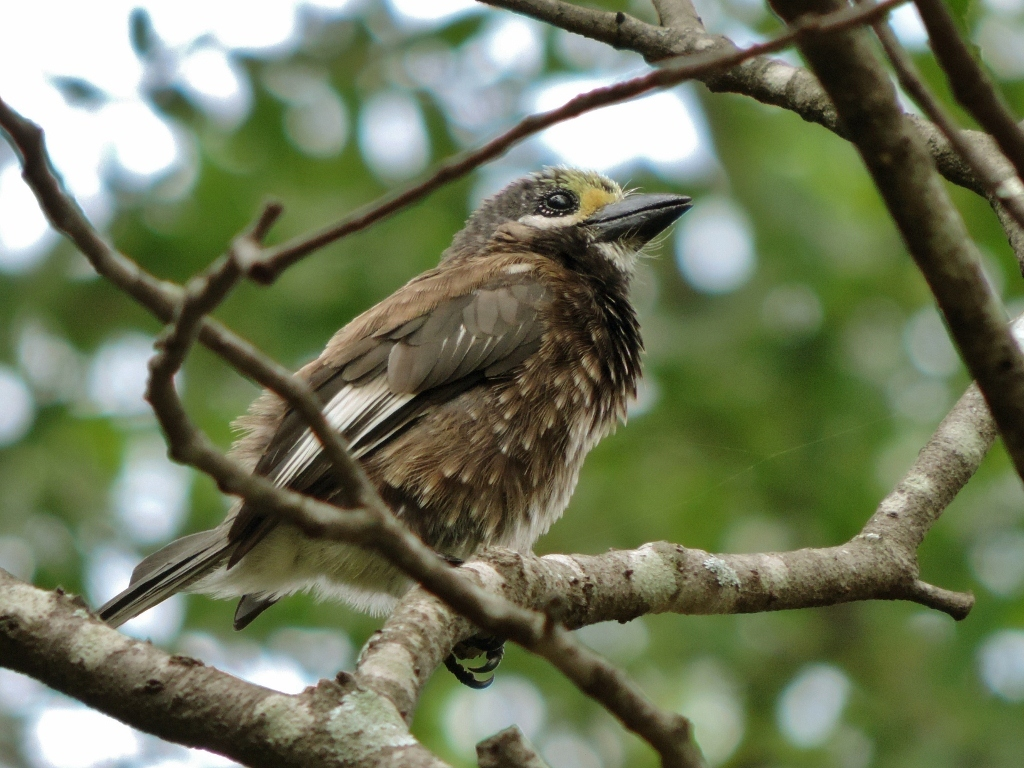

Conservation status
- Least Concern (IUCN 3.1)

Scientific classification
- Kingdom: Animalia
- Phylum: Chordata
- Class: Aves
- Order: Piciformes
- Family: Lybiidae
- Genus: Stactolaema
- Species: S. whytii

Binomial name
- Stactolaema whytii (Shelley, 1893)

Synonyms
- Stactolaema sowerbyi

= Whyte's barbet =

Species of bird

Whyte's barbet (Stactolaema whytii) is a species of bird in the family Lybiidae (African barbets). It is found in Malawi, Mozambique, Tanzania, Zambia, and Zimbabwe.

The common name and Latin binomial commemorate the naturalist Alexander Whyte, who collected in what is now Malawi.

The bird is 18–20.4 cm (7.1–8.0 in) long and weighs 51–63 g (1.8–2.2 oz). It is mainly brownish with a large black bill, head, and tail. The bird has a white malar mark, wings, and tail. There is also a small red spot under the malar mark.

== Subspecies ==
Six subspecies are recognised:

- S. w. buttoni (White, CMN, 1945) – north-central Zambia (along border with Democratic Republic of the Congo); probably also southern Democratic Republic of the Congo
- S. w. stresemanni (Grote, H, 1934) – southwestern corner of Tanzania and adjacent northeastern Zambia
- S. w. terminata (Clancey, PA, 1956) – highlands of southern Tanzania (Iringa region)
- S. w. angoniensis (Benson, CW, 1964) – eastern Zambia to southwestern Malawi (west of Shire River)
- S. w. whytii (Shelley, GE, 1893) – south-central Tanzania to southeastern Malawi and Mozambique
- S. w. sowerbyi Sharpe, RB, 1898 – eastern Zimbabwe to far southern Malawi
