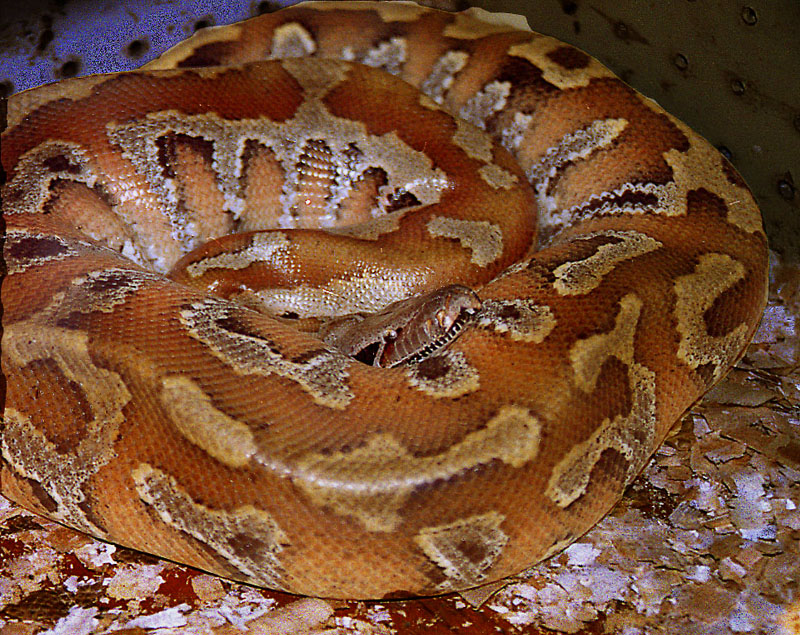

Conservation status
- Least Concern (IUCN 3.1)

Scientific classification
- Kingdom: Animalia
- Phylum: Chordata
- Class: Reptilia
- Order: Squamata
- Suborder: Serpentes
- Family: Pythonidae
- Genus: Python
- Species: P. breitensteini

Binomial name
- Python breitensteini Steindachner, 1880

Synonyms
- Python breitensteini Steindachner, 1880; Python curtus breitensteini — Stull, 1935; Python curtus breitensteini — Stimson, 1969; Python breitensteini Keogh, Barker & Shine, 2001

= Borneo python =

Species of snake

The Borneo python (Python breitensteini), also known commonly as the Borneo short-tailed python, is a species of non-venomous snake in the family Pythonidae. The species is endemic to the island of Borneo.

== Taxonomy ==
For a while considered a subspecies of Python curtus, P. breitensteini was re-elevated to a full species by Keogh, Barker and Shine (2001). The specific name, breitensteini, is in honor of Heinrich Breitenstein, a German physician and naturalist who collected amphibians and reptiles in Borneo.

== Description ==
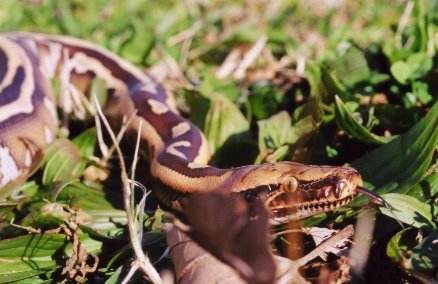
Juvenile

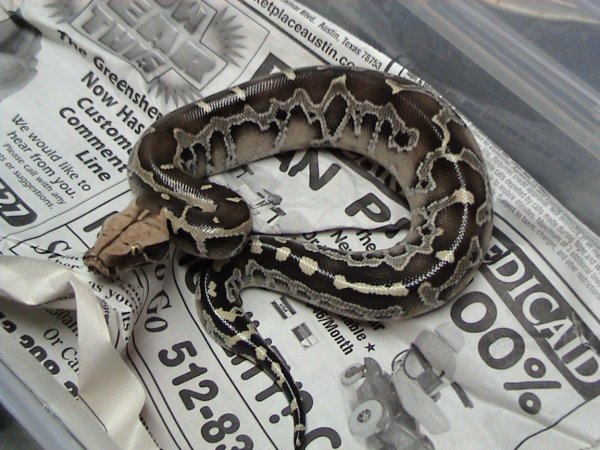
Juvenile in captivity

Adults of P. breitensteini have been reported to attain a total length (including tail) of 2.1 m (7 ft), although they are usually no more than 1.2 m (4 ft). Heavy-bodied, they can weigh as much as 13.6 kg (30 lb). Females are generally larger than males. The head is broad with several thermoreceptive pits along the nose. The tail is short and tapering.

The color pattern is usually tan with brown blotching, which varies greatly. Though no instances of albinism have been reported, a few individuals display a significantly lighter color, appearing more yellow than brown. Juveniles have a more contrasting pattern than adults. The head is usually yellow.

== Distribution and habitat ==
On the island of Borneo, P. breitensteini is found in Brunei, Indonesia, and Malaysia. Typically, it is found at lower elevations, on poorly drained flood plains, or on the edges of swampy areas; man-made irrigation of farmland has also provided appropriate habitat.

== Reproduction ==
P. breitensteini is oviparous.

== Captivity ==
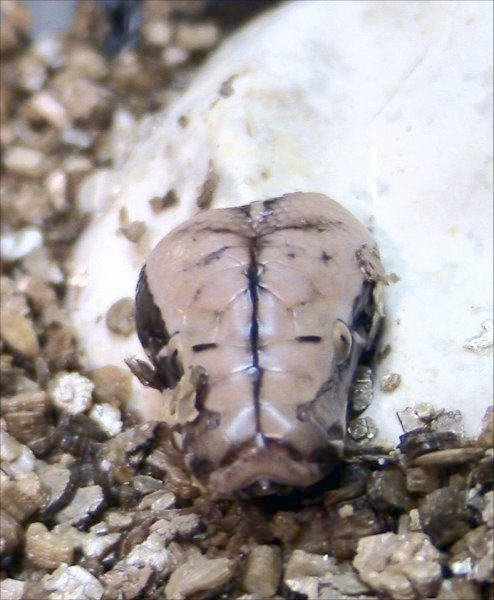
Hatchling egg tooth visible

While the Borneo python generally has a reputation for being mean-tempered, this species is increasing in popularity among reptile enthusiasts because captive-bred specimens are recognized as easier to handle than wild-caught snakes. Almost all of the early imported animals were animals originally caught for the skin trade.
