= Python europaeus =

Python europaeus Temporal range: Early Miocene–Middle Miocene

Scientific classification
- Kingdom: Animalia
- Phylum: Chordata
- Class: Reptilia
- Order: Squamata
- Suborder: Serpentes
- Family: Pythonidae
- Genus: Python
- Species: †P. europaeus

Binomial name
- †Python europaeus Szyndlar & Rage, 2003

Extinct species of snake

Python europaeus is an extinct python species. It lived during the early/middle Miocene. The holotype is a single trunk vertebra found in France.

== Discovery and naming ==
Fossilized remains of Python europaeus were first reported in 1958 by French herpetologist Robert Hoffstetter, decades before the species was named, who published that python fossils had been found in the localities of Pontlevoy, La Grive-Saint-Alban and Mont Ceindre (now known as Vieux Collonges) in France. The material from Vieux Collonges would be mentioned in later works published in during the 1970s and 1980s, which refer to the material as an unnamed species of Python. In 2001, the Vieux Collonges material, consisting of over 300 vertebrae and a palatine bone, was illustrated and redescribed in detail by Martin Ivanov, though he believed the incompleteness of the skull made it impossible to identify this material to the species level, and identified it only as a member of the genus Python.

In 2003, a study reanalysed the python fossils first reported by Hoffstetter and determined that they represent a new species, distinguished from others by its lower neural spines. This species was given the name Python europaeus, the specific name referring to Europe, the continent from which its remains originate. A single trunk vertebra from Vieux Collonges (MNHN, VCO 29) was designated as the holotype specimen of this species, with an additional 379 vertebrae and one palatine bone being referred to it. The referred material originates from Vieux Collonges and La Grive-Saint-Alban, however no python remains could be traced from Pontlevoy, leading the authors to suggest that the supposed python fossils from Pontlevoy reported by Hoffstetter are actually remains of Botrophis gaudryi.
