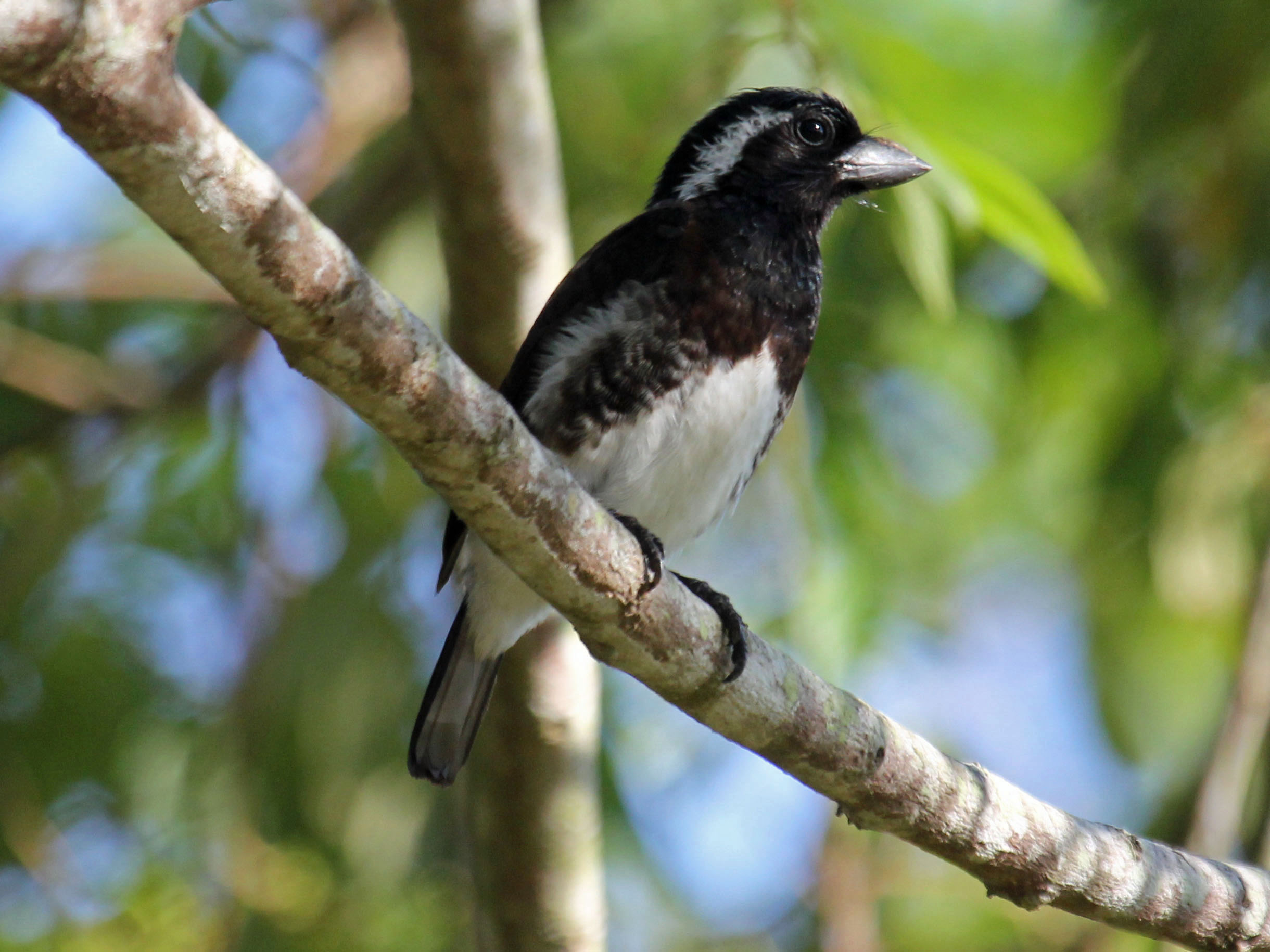
- In South Africa

Conservation status
- Least Concern (IUCN 3.1)

Scientific classification
- Kingdom: Animalia
- Phylum: Chordata
- Class: Aves
- Order: Piciformes
- Family: Lybiidae
- Genus: Stactolaema
- Species: S. leucotis

Binomial name
- Stactolaema leucotis (Sundevall, 1850)

Subspecies
- S. l. kilimensis - (Shelley, 1889); S. l. leucogrammica - (Reichenow, 1915); S. l. leucotis - (Sundevall, 1850)

= White-eared barbet =

Species of bird

The white-eared barbet (Stactolaema leucotis) is a species of bird in the family Lybiidae (African barbets). It is found in Eswatini, Kenya, Malawi, Mozambique, South Africa, Tanzania, and Zimbabwe.

== Description ==
Size is 17–18 cm. Weight 48–63 g. Dark brown woodland barbet with white belly and dark head; eyes brown with grey-black orbital skin, legs and feet black to grey-brown, with grey soles, and black bill. The amount of white on the face, rump, and wings varies geographically, but there is always a white stripe behind the eye. Sexes alike. Immature blacker than adult.

== Habitat ==
Highland forest and moist primary and secondary forest and some forest edge, also nearby gardens and plantations where fruiting trees present, and where dead trees and limbs are available for excavation; appears able to use Eucalyptus plantations in some areas, including for breeding, provided some native trees and understory remain. In Malawi, can be found up to elevations of 2600 m in the north and to at least 1600 m in the south, often on forested slopes.

== Diet and Feeding ==
Diet comprises fruits, including figs, guavas, pawpaws, mangoes, juniper, Celtis gomphophylla, and other berries. Also consumes insects, including hornets, wasps, roaches, dragonflies, crickets, moths, grasshoppers and armored locusts (Phymaetus spp.), and spiders.

Uses special sites as "anvils" for killing and disarming insects. Gleans, works over bark, and flycatches for termites and other aerial insects. Aggressive and dominant at food sources, e.g. over other barbets.

== Vocalizations ==
Various harsh "skreek" calls.

== Gallery ==
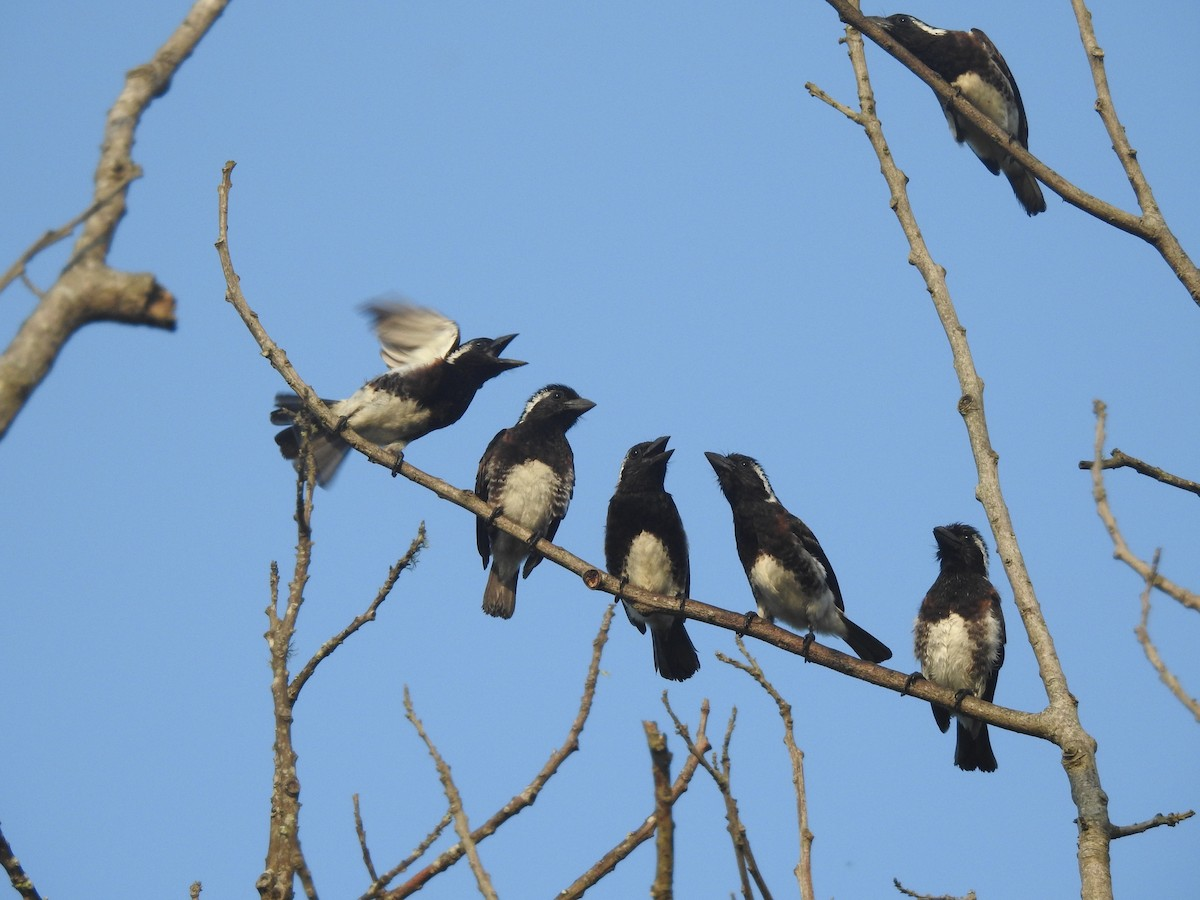
Family group

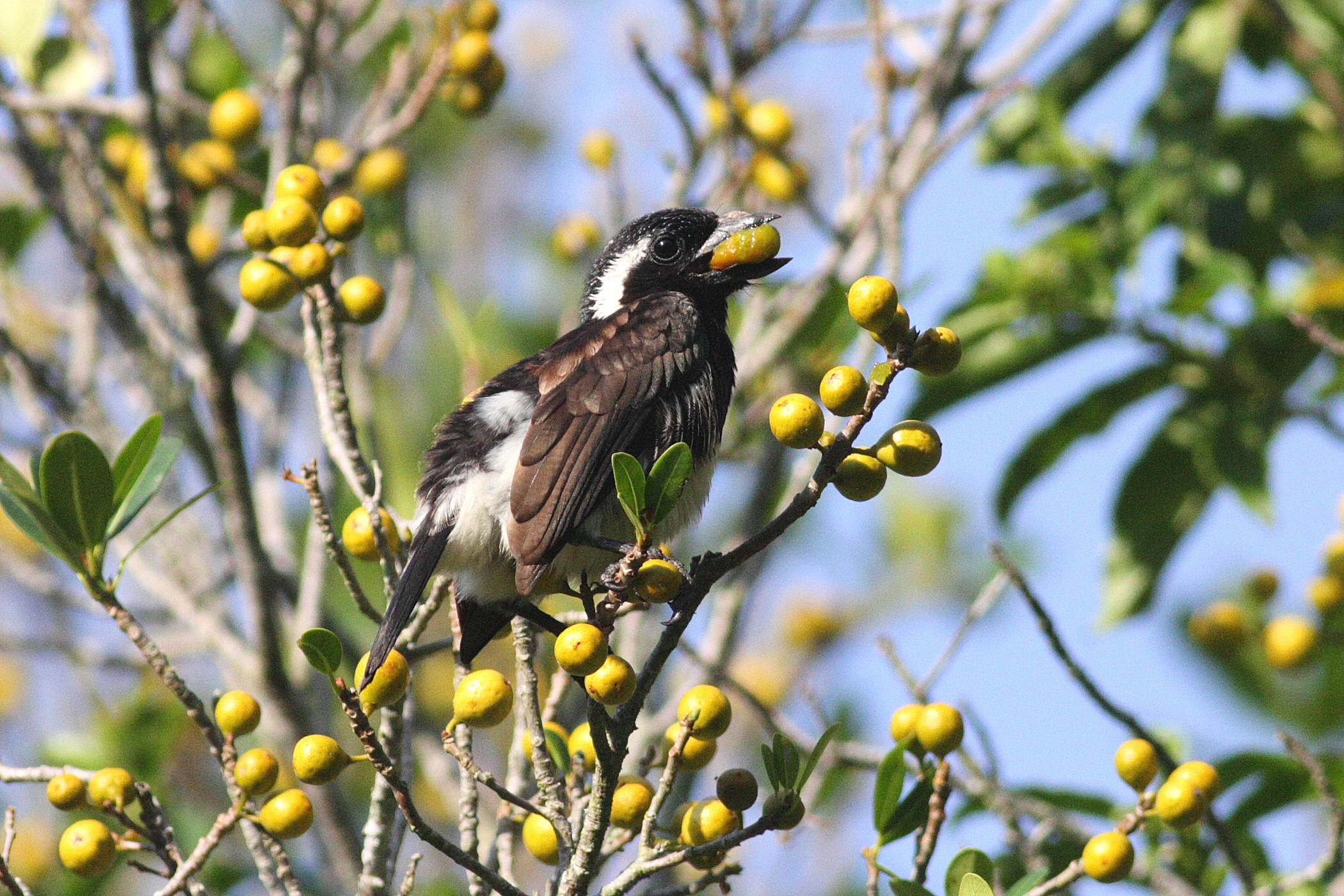
Eating fruit
