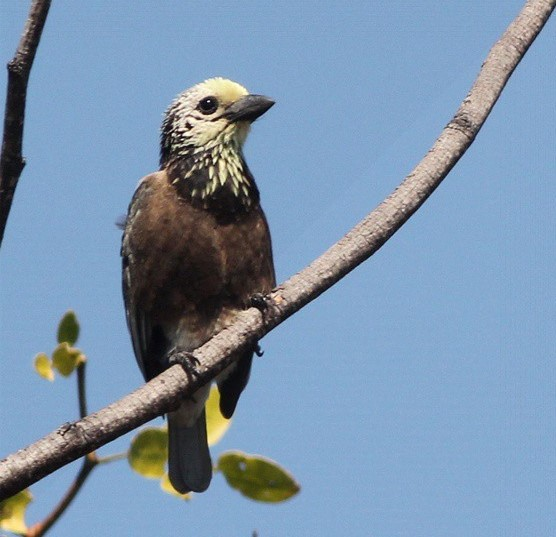

Conservation status
- Least Concern (IUCN 3.1)

Scientific classification
- Kingdom: Animalia
- Phylum: Chordata
- Class: Aves
- Order: Piciformes
- Family: Lybiidae
- Genus: Stactolaema
- Species: S. anchietae

Binomial name
- Stactolaema anchietae (Barboza du Bocage, 1869)

Subspecies
- S. a. katangae - (Vincent, 1934); S. a. anchietae - (Barboza du Bocage, 1869); S. a. rex - (Neumann, 1908)

= Anchieta's barbet =

Species of bird

Anchieta's barbet (Stactolaema anchietae) is a species of bird in the Lybiidae family.

It is found in Angola, Democratic Republic of the Congo, and Zambia.

It is named after the Portuguese naturalist and explorer José Alberto de Oliveira Anchieta.

The bird is 17.6–20 cm (6.9–7.9 in) long and weighs 36–54 g (1.3–1.9 oz), making it somewhat small amongst barbets. It is mainly brown, with a large black bill. It has a yellow head, yellow outer wings, and yellow rump.

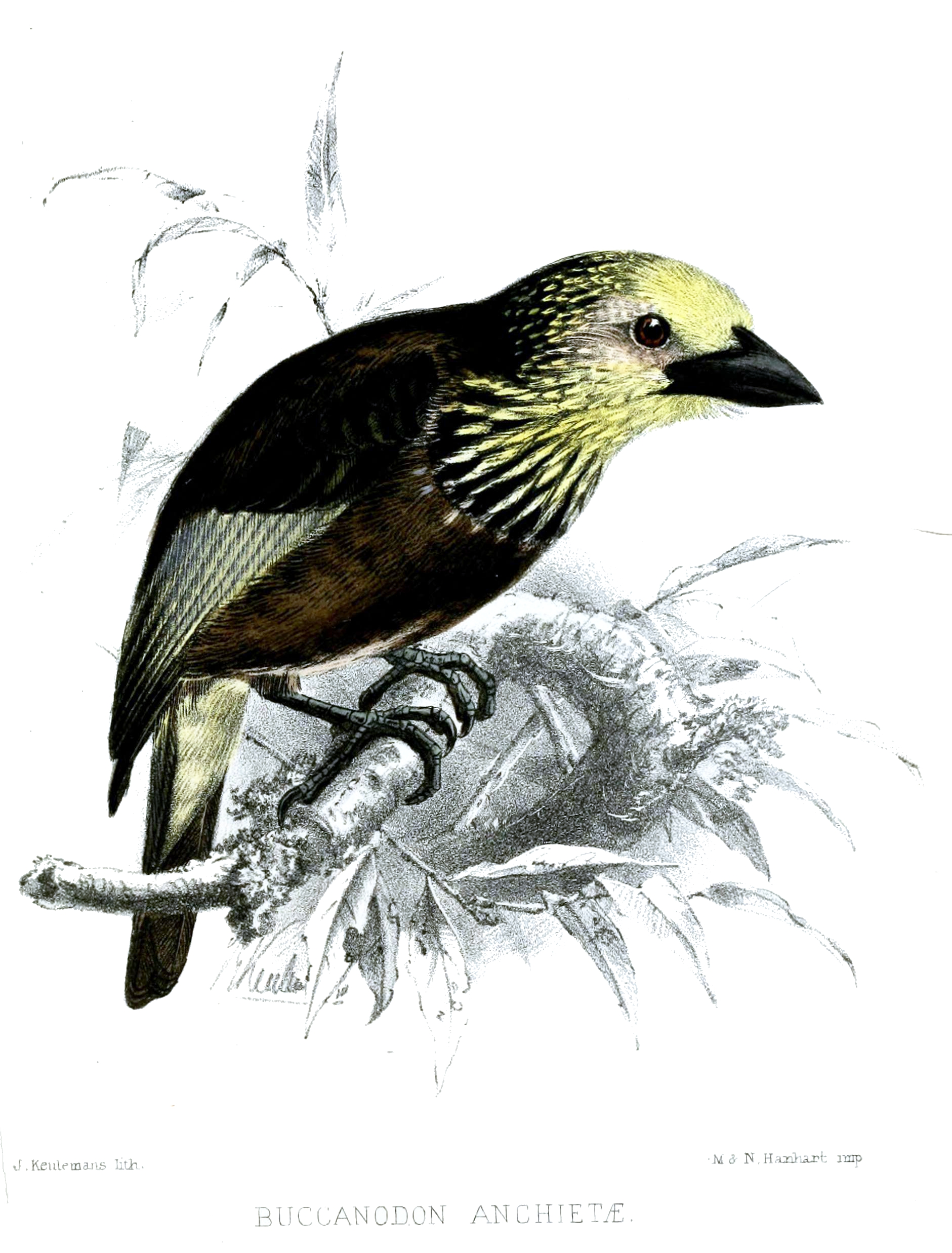
Illustration by Keulemans
