= Egg tooth =

Projection used by offspring to break out of egg while hatching

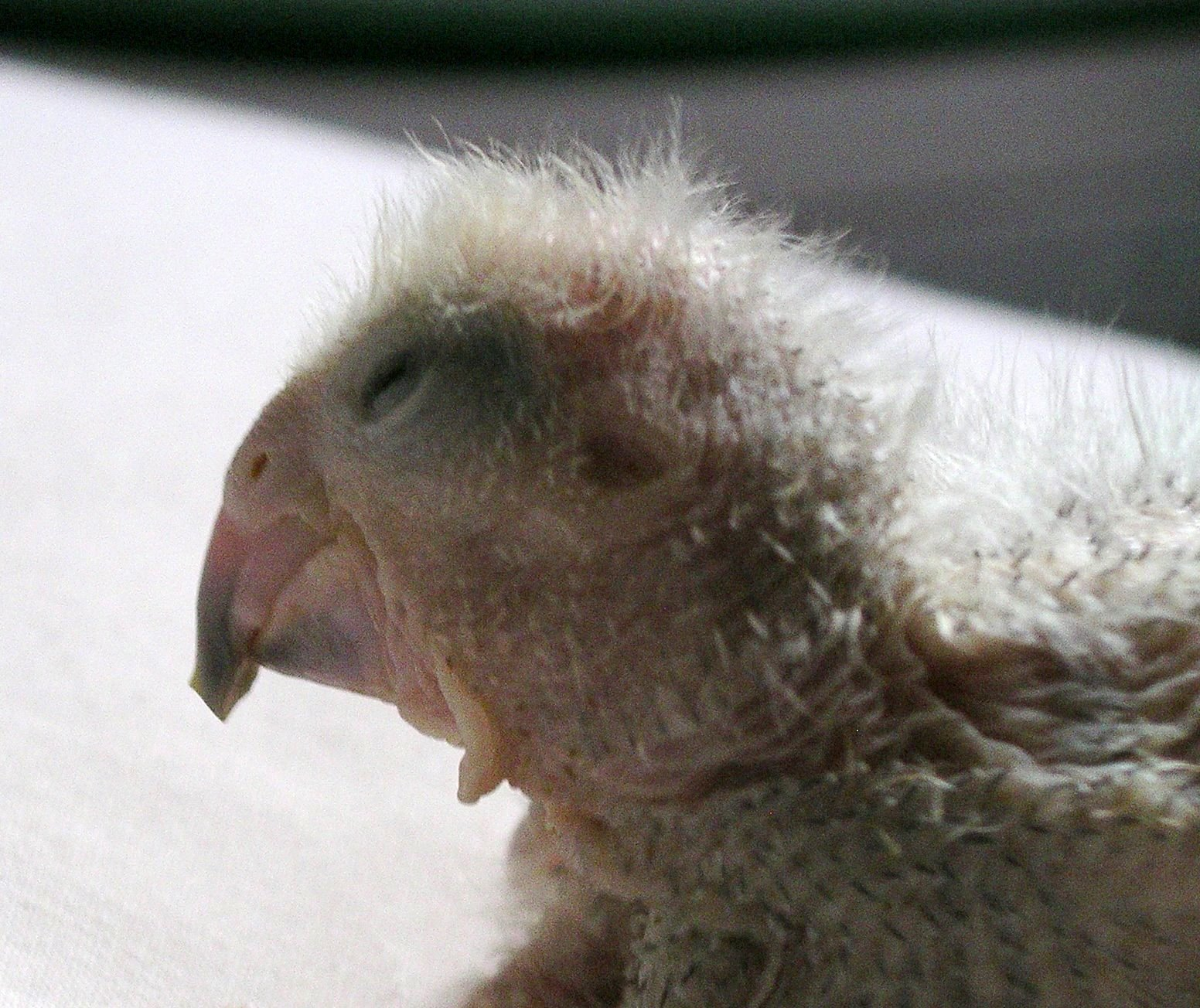
A Senegal parrot chick at about 2 weeks after hatching. The egg tooth is near the tip of its beak on the upper mandible.

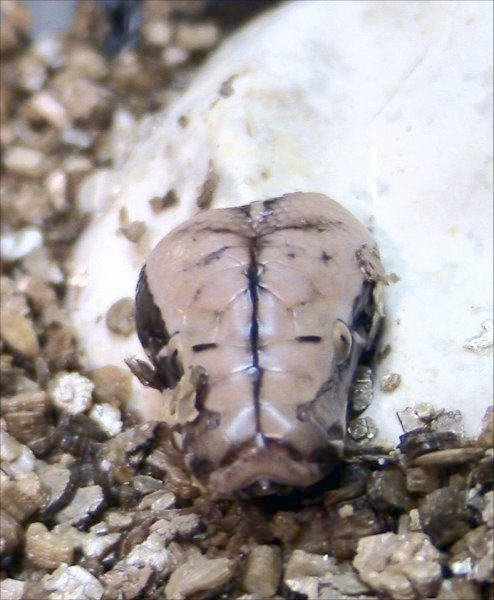
Borneo short-tailed python (Python breitensteini) hatchling with egg tooth visible

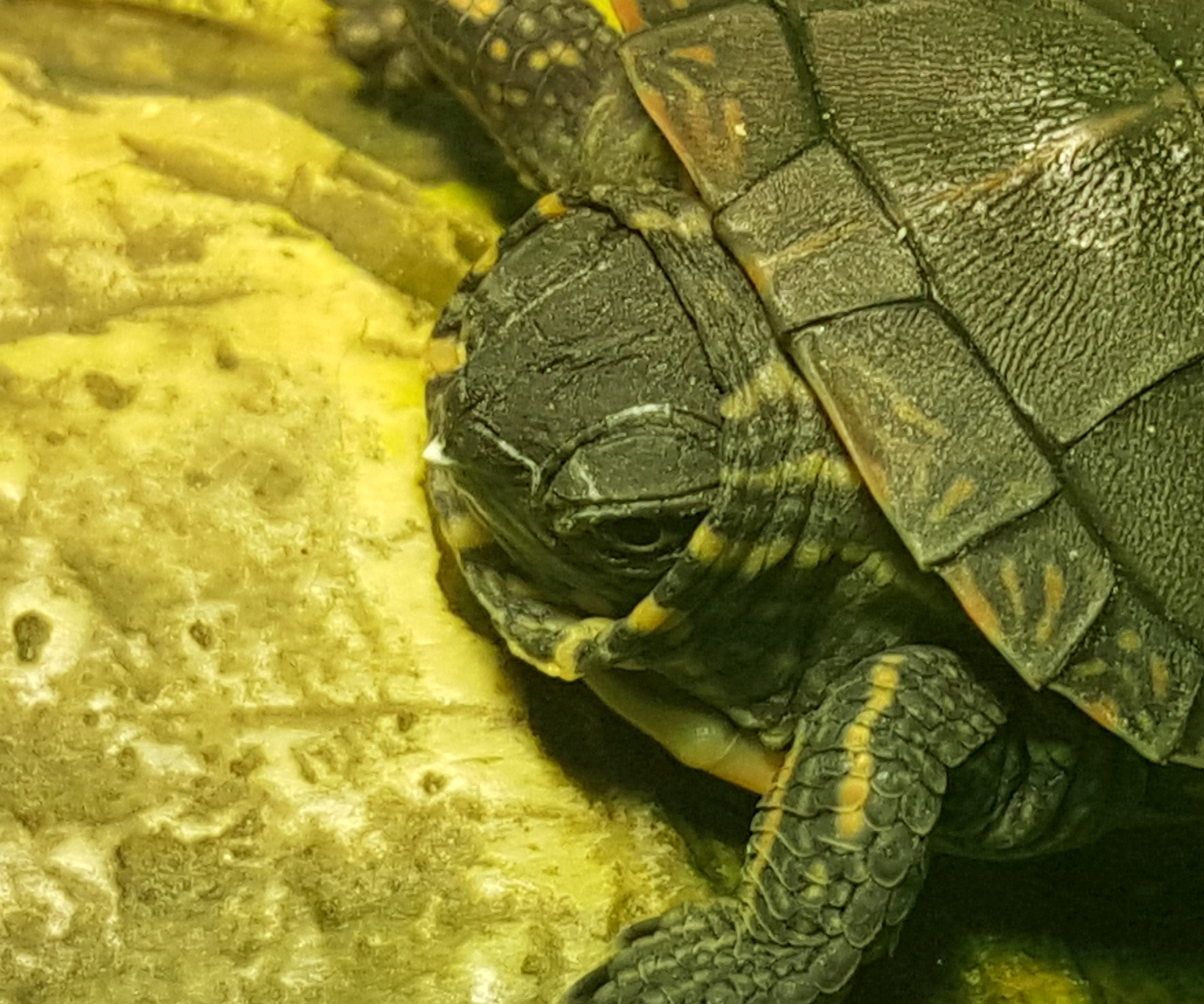
A painted turtle hatchling with an egg tooth

An egg tooth is a temporary, sharp projection present on the bill or snout of an oviparous animal at hatching. It allows the hatchling to penetrate the eggshell from inside and break free. Birds, reptiles, and monotremes possess egg teeth as hatchlings. Similar structures exist in eleutherodactyl frogs (the group known to bypass the tadpole stage), several groups of insects (the structure known as egg burster) and spiders.

== Birds ==
When it is close to hatching, a chick uses its egg tooth to pierce the air sac between the membrane and the eggshell. This sac provides a few hours' worth of air, during which time the chick hatches. When a chick is ready to hatch from its egg, it begins the process of "pipping"; forcing the egg tooth through the shell repeatedly as the embryo rotates, eventually cutting away a section at the blunt end of the egg, leaving a hole through which the bird may emerge. Some species, including woodpeckers, have two egg teeth; one on both the upper and lower bill. After time the egg tooth falls off or is absorbed into the growing chick's bill.

Some precocial species such as the kiwi, and superprecocial species including megapodes, do not require an egg tooth to assist them in hatching. They are strong enough at the time of hatching to use their legs and feet to crack open the egg. Megapode embryos develop and shed their egg tooth before hatching.

== Snakes and lizards ==
Most squamates (lizards and snakes) also lay eggs, and similarly need an egg tooth. Unlike in other amniotes, the egg tooth of squamates is an actual tooth which develops from the premaxilla.

== Crocodilians ==
A baby crocodile has an egg tooth on the end of its snout. It is a tough piece of skin which is resorbed less than two months after hatching. Crocodile eggs are similar to those of birds in that they have an inner membrane and an outer one. The egg tooth is used to tear open the inner membrane; the baby crocodile can then push its way through the outer shell. If conditions are particularly dry that year, the inner membrane may be too tough for the crocodile to break through, and without assistance it will simply die inside the egg. Generally, however, the mother crocodile helps free it.
