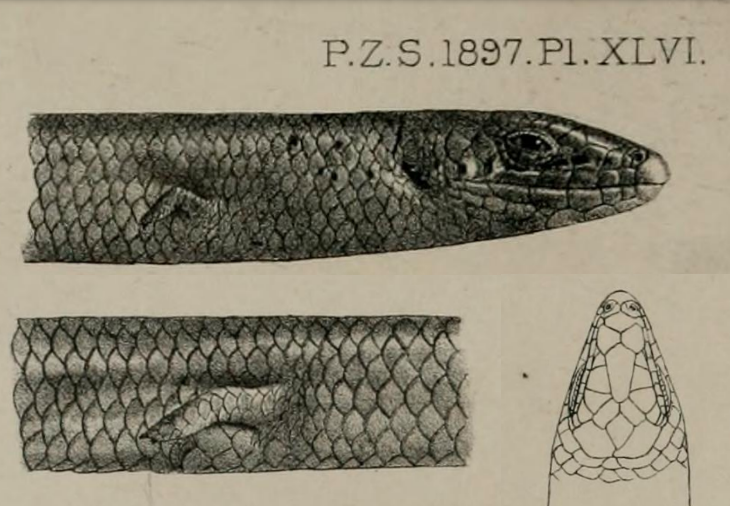
- Eumecia johnstoni

Scientific classification
- Domain: Eukaryota
- Kingdom: Animalia
- Phylum: Chordata
- Class: Reptilia
- Order: Squamata
- Family: Scincidae
- Subfamily: Mabuyinae
- Genus: Eumecia; Bocage, 1870

= Eumecia =

Genus of lizards

Eumecia is a genus of skinks found in Sub-Saharan Africa.

== Classification ==
There are two species:

- Eumecia anchietae Bocage, 1870 - Anchieta's snake skink, western serpentiform skink, Lunda western snake skink
- Eumecia johnstoni (Boulenger, 1897)
