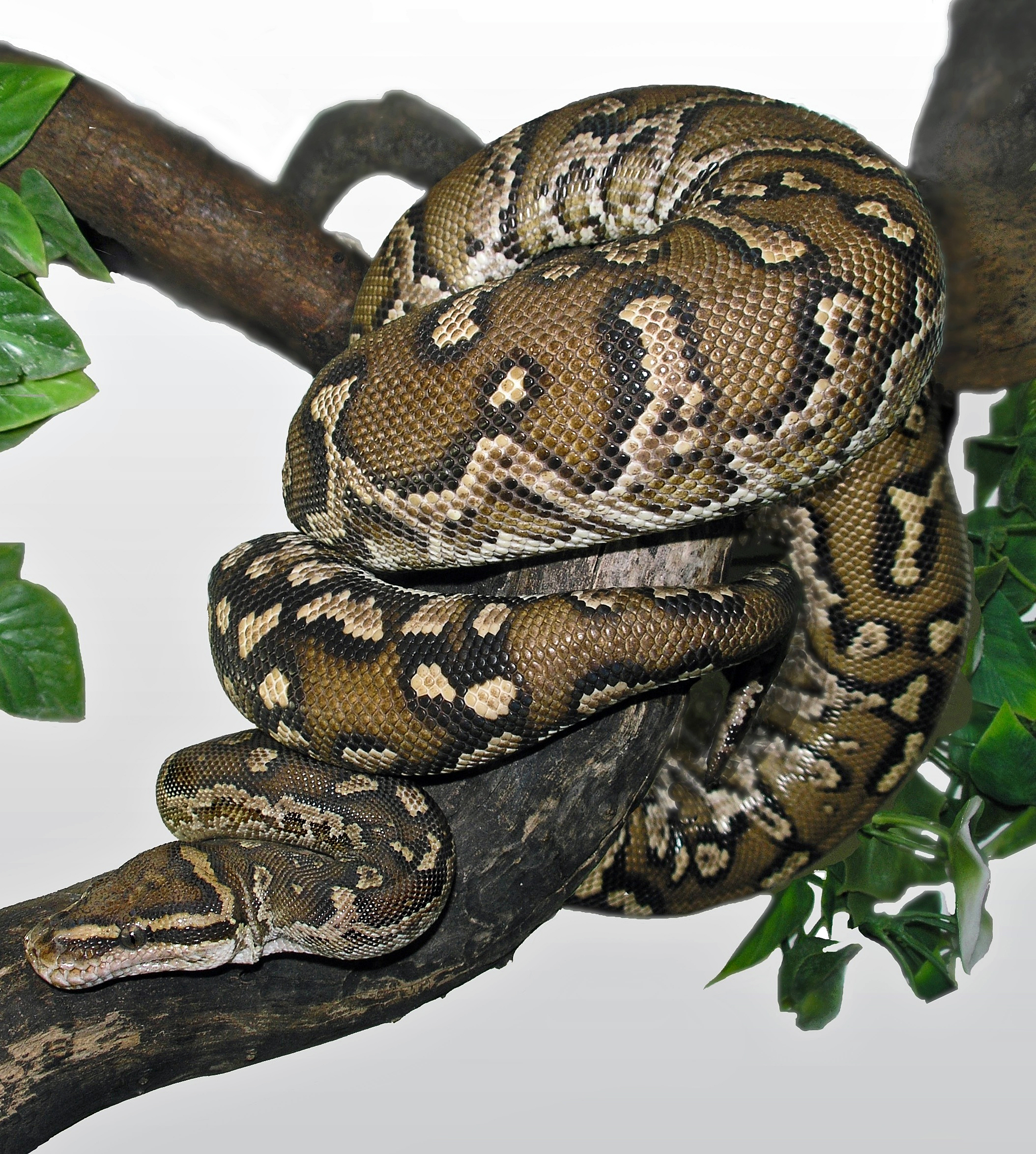

Conservation status
- Least Concern (IUCN 3.1)

Scientific classification
- Kingdom: Animalia
- Phylum: Chordata
- Class: Reptilia
- Order: Squamata
- Suborder: Serpentes
- Family: Pythonidae
- Genus: Python
- Species: P. anchietae

Binomial name
- Python anchietae Bocage, 1887
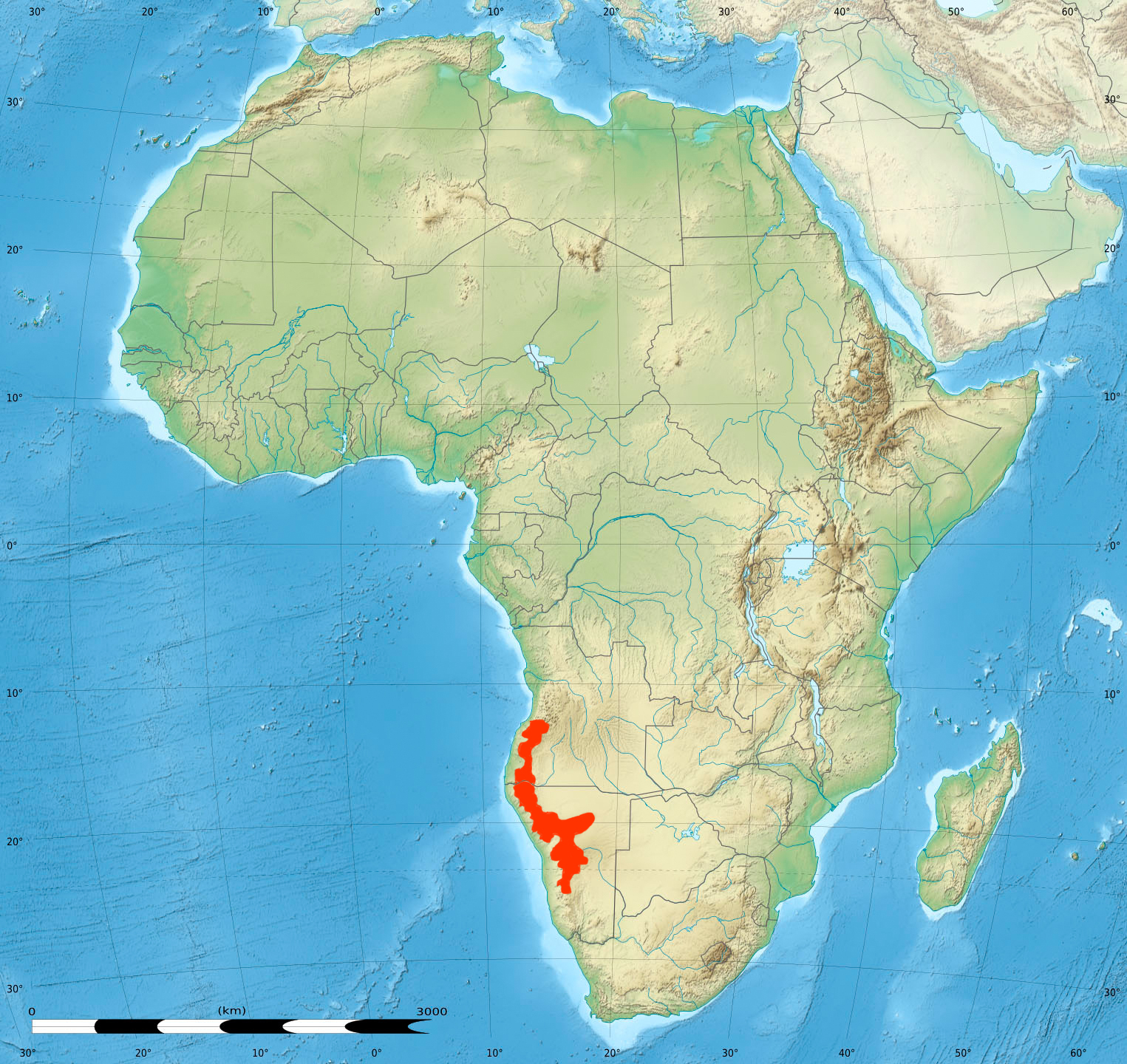
- Approximate distribution

Synonyms
- Python Anchietae Bocage, 1887; Python anchietæ — Boulenger, 1893

= Python anchietae =

Species of snake

Python anchietae (with common names Angolan python and Anchieta's dwarf python) is a python species endemic to southern Africa. According to Donald George Broadley (1990), this species is most closely related to the ball python (P. regius) of western Africa, and no subspecies are currently recognized. It is named after the Portuguese naturalist and explorer José Alberto de Oliveira Anchieta. Like all other pythons, it is not venomous.

== Description ==
Python anchietae may grow up to 183 cm (6 ft) in total length (including tail). The color pattern is a reddish-brown to brown to almost black ground, overlaid with irregular white or cream-colored bands and spots. The belly is yellowish. A rare species seldom seen in the wild or in captivity, it is the only python to have "bead-like" head scales. It has heat sensitive pits, five on each side of the head, on the upper lip. The smooth dorsal scales are arranged in 57-61 rows.

== Distribution and habitat ==
Python anchietae is found in Africa in southern Angola and northern Namibia. The type locality given is "Catumbella [Catumbela]" near Lobito, Angola. Habitats are rocky outcrops or areas strewn with rocks in open brush or grassland. Diurnal, they shelter in small caves, overhangs and crevices.

== Behaviour and biology ==
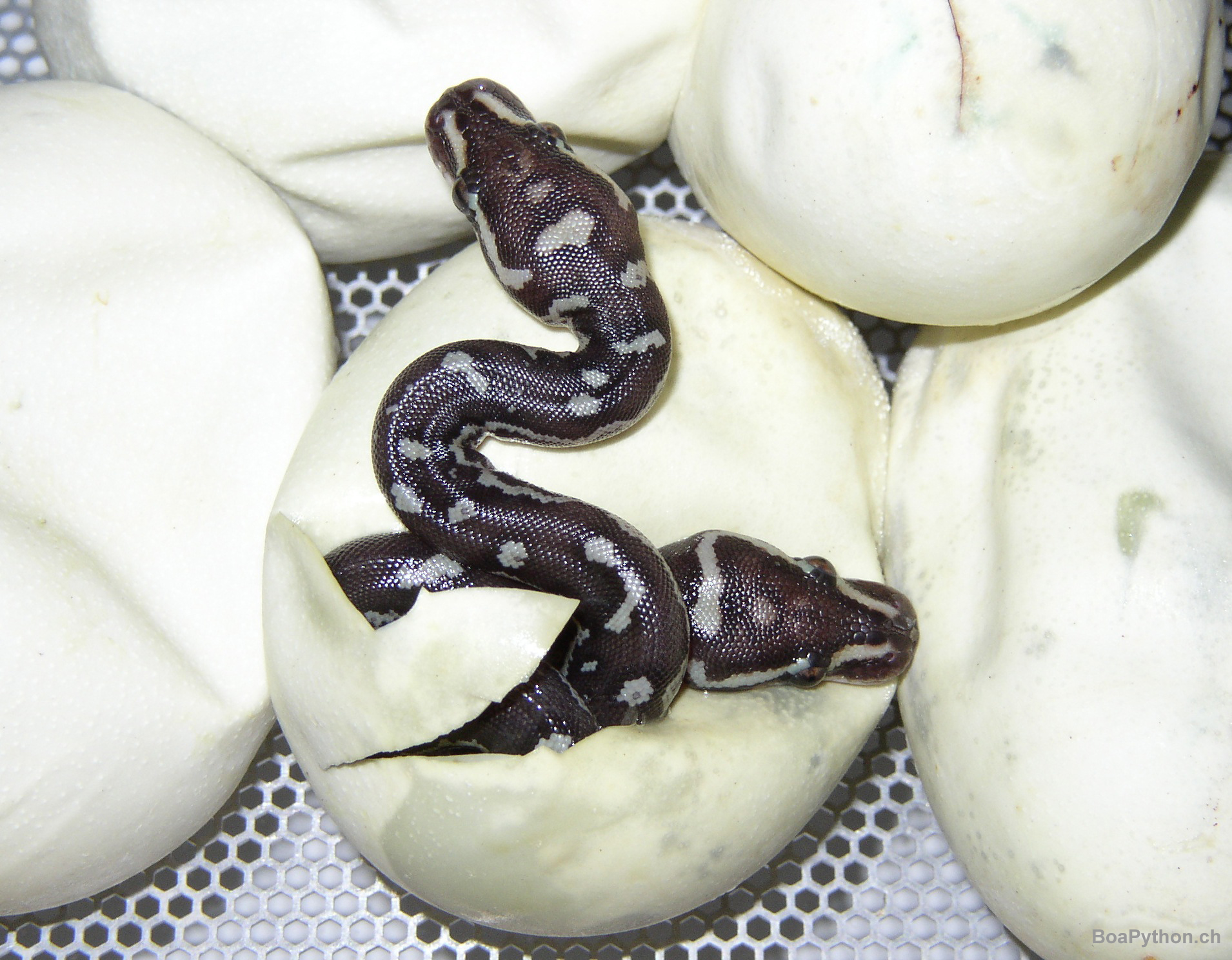
Hatching twins

Python anchietae exhibits hisses, which are mostly bluff. Its diet consists of small mammals and birds. It is oviparous, with small clutches of four to five eggs being produced at a time. Hatchlings are 43–46 cm (17–18 in)long.
