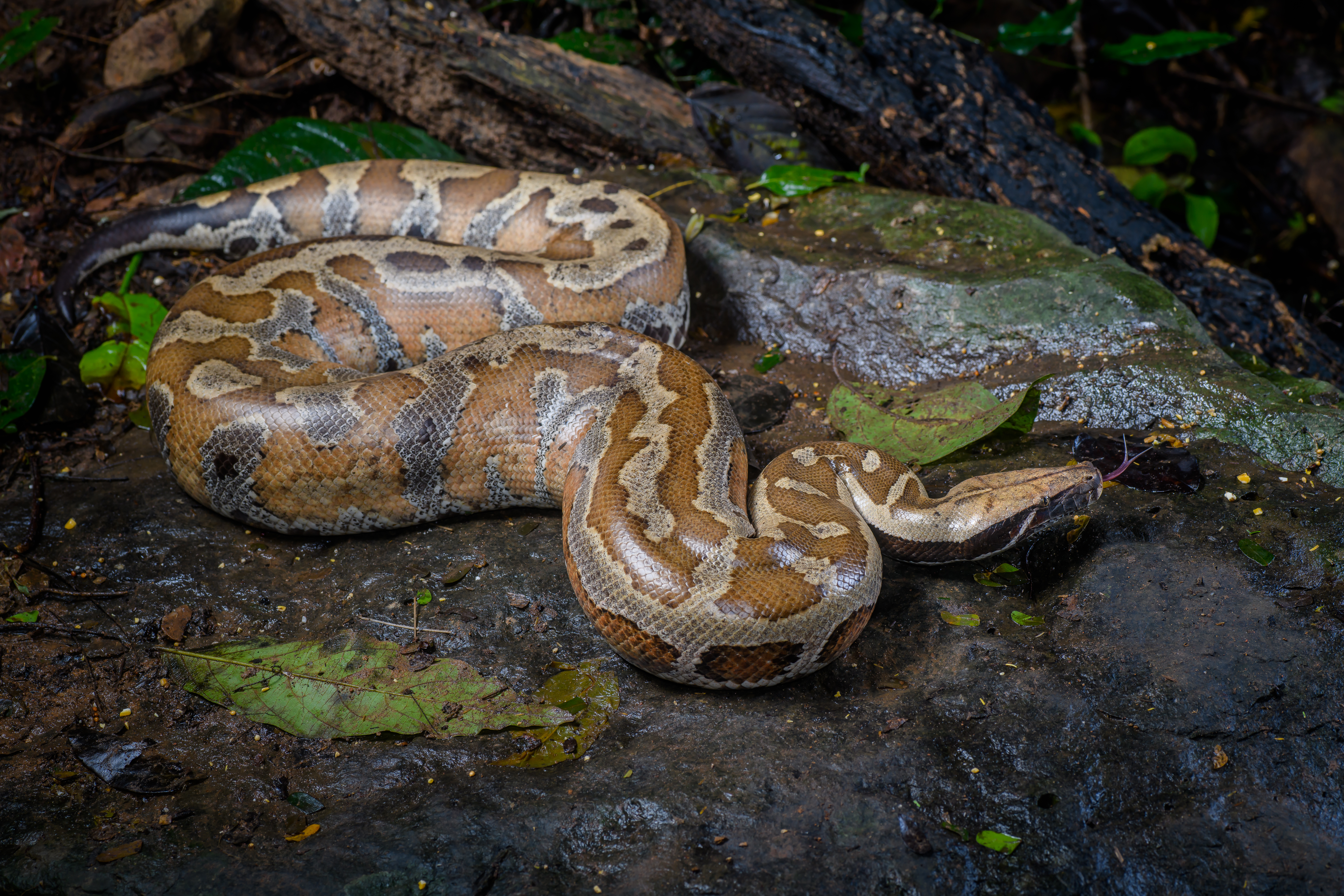

Conservation status
- Least Concern (IUCN 3.1)

Scientific classification
- Kingdom: Animalia
- Phylum: Chordata
- Class: Reptilia
- Order: Squamata
- Suborder: Serpentes
- Family: Pythonidae
- Genus: Python
- Species: P. brongersmai

Binomial name
- Python brongersmai Stull, 1938

Synonyms
- Python curtus brongersmai Stull, 1938; Python curtus brongersmai — Cox et al., 1998; Python curtus brongersmai — Chan-ard et al., 1999; Python brongersmai — Pauwels et al., 2000; Python brongersmai — Keogh, Barker & Shine, 2001; Aspidoboa brongersmai — Hoser, 2004; Python brongersmai — Schleip & O'Shea, 2010

= Python brongersmai =

Species of snake

Python brongersmai is a species of non-venomous snake in the family Pythonidae. The species is native to Southeast Asia. Previously considered a subspecies of Python curtus, it was recognized as a distinct species around 2000.

== Common names ==
Common names for P. brongersmai include blood python, Brongersma's short-tailed python, Malaysian blood python, red blood python, red short-tailed python, and Sumatran blood python.

== Etymology ==
The specific name, brongersmai, is in honor of Dutch herpetologist Leo Brongersma.

== Geographic range ==
P. brongersmai is found in peninsular (Western) Malaysia, Sumatra east of the central dividing range of mountains, Bangka Island and other islands in the Strait of Malacca, including the Lingga Islands, Riau islands, and Pinang, Thailand, and Vietnam.

== Habitat ==
The preferred natural habitat of P. brongersmai is marshes and tropical swamps in forest, at altitudes from sea level to 650 m (2,130 ft).

== Behaviour ==
Python brongersmai is a primarily crepuscular species (usually active around dawn and dusk).

== Size ==
Hatchlings of P. brongersmai range from 25–43 cm (10–17 in) in total length (including tail). Adult males typically range from 91–152 cm (36–60 in) in total length, and females between 120–180 cm (48–72 in) although a few have been recorded at 240 cm (96 in). These snakes generally look overweight due to their robust structure.

== Lifespan ==
P. brongersmai can live up to about 20 years in captivity.

== Coloration ==
The color pattern of P. brongersmai consists of rich, bright red to orange to a duller rusty red ground color, although populations with yellow and brown are known. This is overlaid with yellow and tan blotches and stripes that run the length of the body, as well as tan and black spots that extend up the flanks. The belly is white, often with small black markings. The head is usually a shade of grey; individual snakes can change how light and dark the head is. A white postocular stripe runs down and back from the posterior edge of the eye.

== Reproduction ==
Python brongersmai is oviparous, with up to 30 eggs being laid at a time. The female coils around her eggs and shivers her body, producing heat to incubate the eggs properly.

== Commercial trade ==
Once widely considered to be generally unpredictable and aggressive, P. brongersmai is gradually becoming more common among herpetoculturists. Formerly, many of the specimens in captivity were wild-caught adults from Malaysia. These are known to be more aggressive than those from Indonesia (Sumatra), from which most of the wild-caught, wild-bred, and captive-bred stock are now descended. Captive-raised juveniles generally become mild-tempered, somewhat-predictable adults. This, combined with several new brightly colored captive bloodlines, is helping to boost the popularity of these much-maligned snakes among reptile hobbyists.

Python brongersmai is part of a commercial harvest for leather. There is evidence to suggest that there are clear indications of misdeclared, underreported and illegal trade involving tens of thousands of blood pythons, and there are questions whether this trade is sustainable.

== Taxonomy ==
This species was first described by Olive Griffith Stull in 1938 as Python curtus brongersmai, a subspecies of Python curtus. This taxon has since been elevated and recognised as a full species, Python brongersmai, by Pauwels et al. (2000).
