= Monopeltis anchietae =

Conservation status
- Least Concern (IUCN 3.1)

Scientific classification
- Kingdom: Animalia
- Phylum: Chordata
- Class: Reptilia
- Order: Squamata
- Clade: Amphisbaenia
- Family: Amphisbaenidae
- Genus: Monopeltis
- Species: M. anchietae

Binomial name
- Monopeltis anchietae (Bocage, 1873)
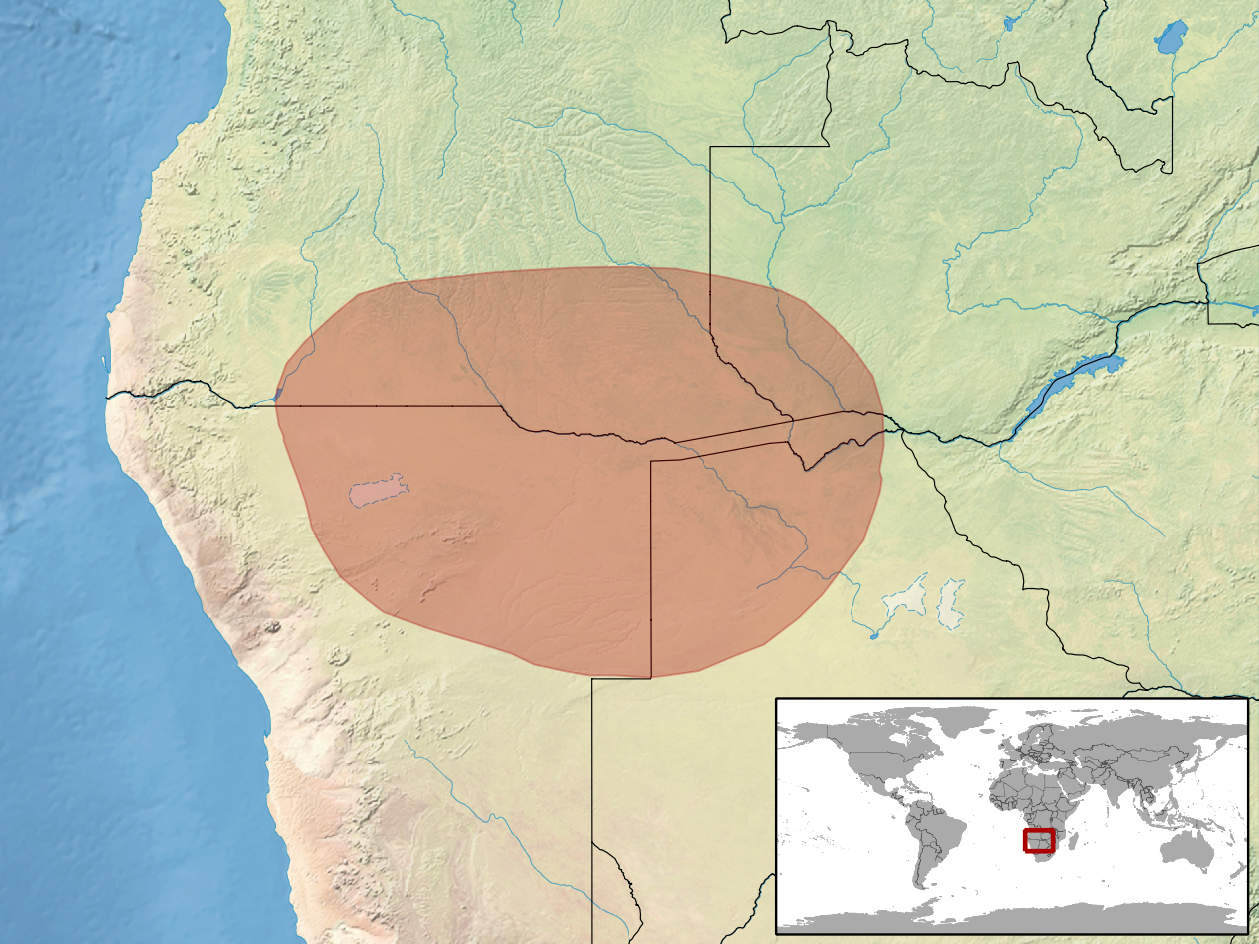

Synonyms
- Lepidosternon (Phractogonus) anchietae Bocage, 1873; Monopeltis quadriscutata F. Werner, 1910; Monopeltis okavangensis Monard, 1931; Monopeltis devisi Monard, 1937; Monopeltis anchietae — Gans, 1967

Species of amphisbaenian

Monopeltis anchietae, also known commonly as Anchieta's worm lizard, Anchieta's spade-snouted worm lizard, and the Angolan spade-snouted worm lizard, is a species of amphisbaenian in the family Amphisbaenidae. The species is native to southern Africa.

== Etymology ==
The specific name, anchietae, is in honor of Portuguese naturalist José Alberto de Oliveira Anchieta, who was an explorer of Africa.

== Geographic range ==
M. anchietae is found in Angola, Botswana, Namibia (including the Caprivi Strip), and Zambia.

== Habitat ==
The preferred natural habitat of M. anchietae is savanna, at altitudes of 500–1,200 m (1,600–3,900 ft).

== Description ==
M. anchietae is reddish brown dorsally, and unpigmented ventrally. The head shields are yellowish tan. Adults usually have a snout-to-vent length (SVL) of 20–30 cm (7.9–11.8 in). The maximum recorded SVL is 34.5 cm (13.6 in).

== Reproduction ==
M. anchietae is viviparous.
