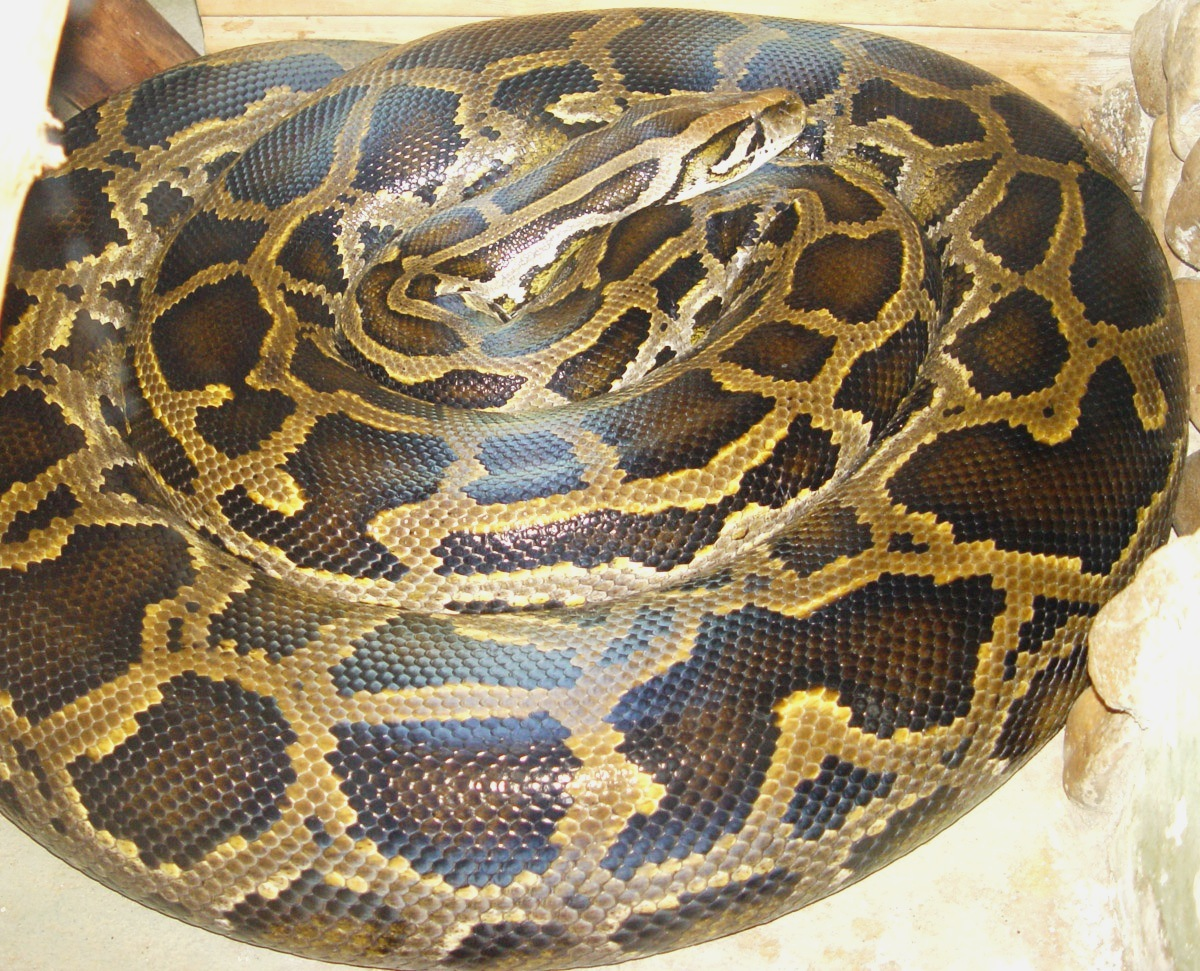
- Burmese python (Python bivittatus)

Scientific classification
- Kingdom: Animalia
- Phylum: Chordata
- Class: Reptilia
- Order: Squamata
- Suborder: Serpentes
- Family: Pythonidae
- Genus: Python; Daudin, 1803

Type species
- Boa molura Linnaeus, 1758

Synonyms
- List: Python Daudin, 1803; Constrictor Wagler, 1830; Enygrus Wagler, 1830; Engyrus Gray, 1831; Enygris Gray, 1842; Heleionomus Gray, 1842; Morelia Gray, 1842; Hortulia Gray, 1842; Asterophis Fitzinger, 1843; Liasis Duméril & Bibron, 1844; Simalia Gray, 1849; Aspidopython Meyer, 1874; Aspidoboa Sauvage, 1884; Hypaspistes Ogilby, 1891

= Python (genus) =

Python Temporal range: Miocene–Present

Genus of snakes

Python is a genus of constricting snakes in the Pythonidae family native to the tropics and subtropics of the Eastern Hemisphere.

The name python was proposed by François Marie Daudin in 1803 for non-venomous flecked snakes. Currently, 10 python species are recognized as valid taxa.

Three formerly considered python subspecies have been promoted, and a new species recognized.

== Taxonomy ==
The generic name Python was proposed by François Marie Daudin in 1803 for non-venomous snakes with a flecked skin and a long split tongue.

In 1993, seven python species were recognized as valid taxa. On the basis of phylogenetic analyses, between seven and 13 python species are recognized.

Species	Image	IUCN Red List and geographic range
Indian python (P. molurus; Linnaeus, 1758)		NT
Central African rock python (P. sebae; Gmelin, 1788)		NT Range shown in green
Ball python (P. regius; Shaw, 1802)		NT
Burmese python (P. bivittatus; Kuhl, 1820)		VU
Southern African rock python (P. natalensis; Smith, 1833)		LC Range shown in orange
Sumatran short-tailed python (P. curtus; Schlegel, 1872)		LC Range shown in yellow
Bornean python (P. breitensteini; Steindachner, 1881)		LC Range shown in green
Angolan python (P. anchietae; Bocage, 1887)		LC
Blood python (P. brongersmai; Stull, 1938) (formerly P. curtus brongersmai)		LC Range shown in red
Myanmar short-tailed python (P. kyaiktiyo; Zug, Gotte & Jacobs, 2011)		VU; West of the Tenasserim Hills, Myanmar
† European python (Python europaeus; Szyndlar & Rage, 2003)		EX Extinct species known from the discovery of a trunk vertebrae dated to the Miocene epoch, found in Vieux-Collonges and La Grive-Saint-Alban, France.

== Distribution and habitat ==
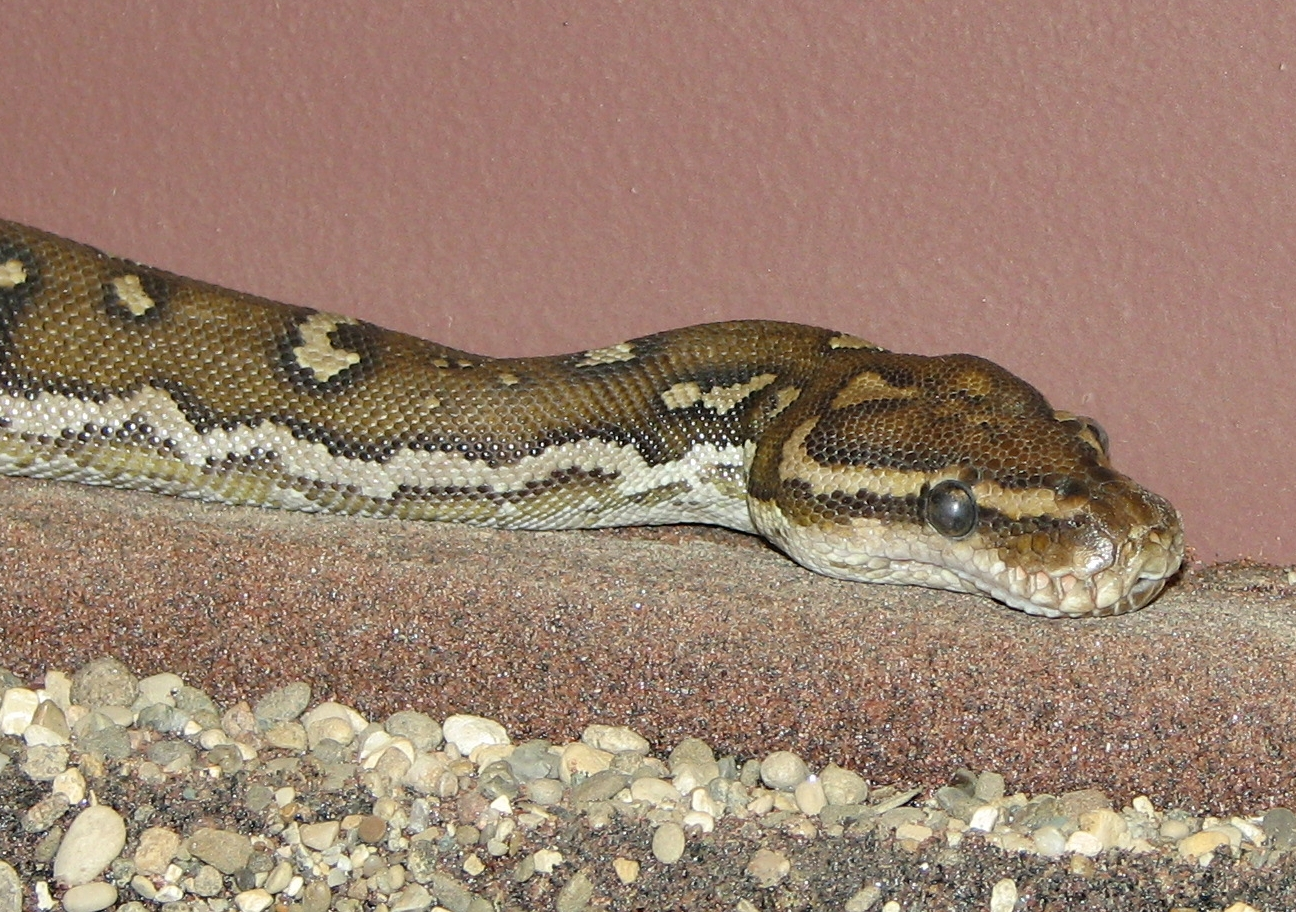
Python anchietae

In Africa, pythons are native to the tropics south of the Sahara, but not in the extreme south-western tip of southern Africa (Western Cape) or in Madagascar. In Asia, they occur from Bangladesh, Nepal, India, Pakistan, and Sri Lanka, including the Nicobar Islands, through Myanmar, east to Indochina, southern China, Hong Kong and Hainan, as well as in the Malayan region of Indonesia and the Philippines.

=== Invasive ===
Some suggest that P. bivittatus and P. sebae have the potential to be problematic invasive species in South Florida. In early 2016, after a culling operation yielded 106 pythons, Everglades National Park officials suggested that "thousands" may live within the park, and that the species has been breeding there for some years. More recent data suggest that these pythons would not withstand winter climates north of Florida, contradicting previous research suggesting a more significant geographic potential range.

== Uses ==
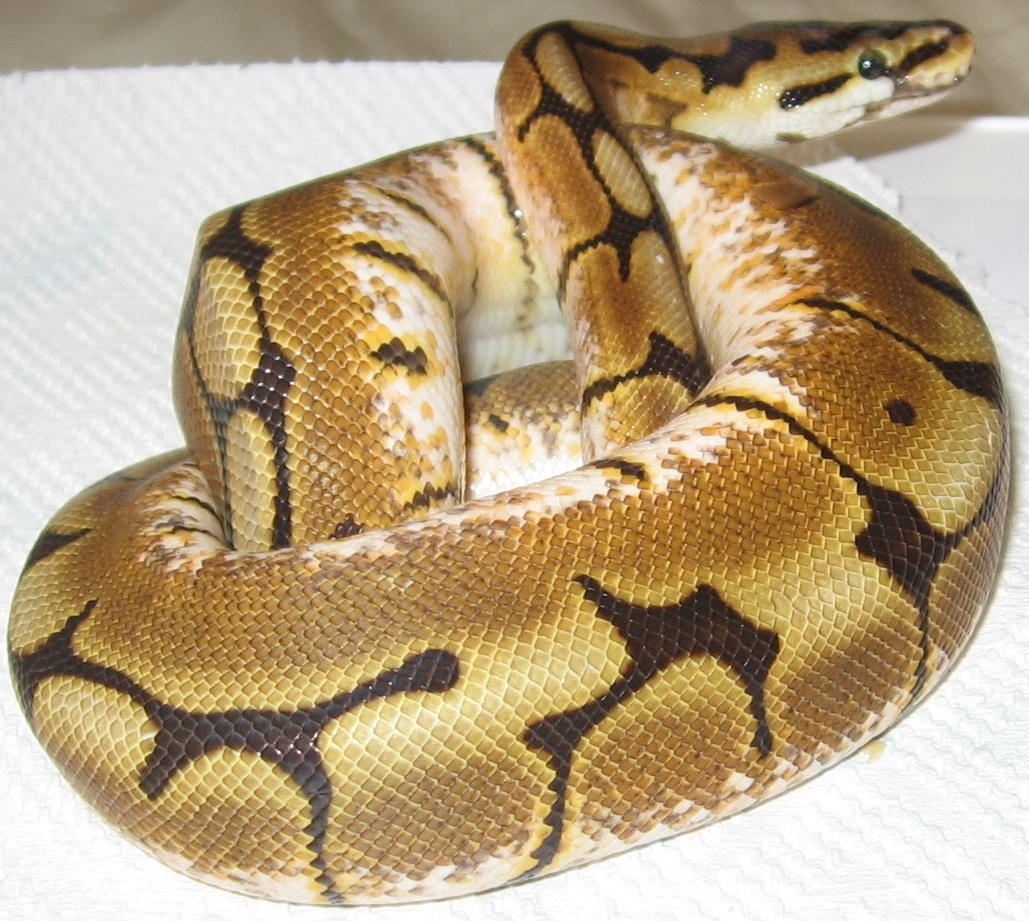
Ball pythons commonly exhibit mutations, such as this "Spider" morph, and are popular among snake keepers.

Python skin is used to make clothing, such as vests, belts, boots and shoes, or fashion accessories such as handbags. It may also be stretched and formed as the sound board of some string musical instruments, such as the erhu spike-fiddle, sanxian and the sanshin lutes. With a high demand of snake skin in the current fashion industry, countries in Africa and Southern Asia partake in the legal and illegal selling of python skin. Providing an extremely low pay for the hunters with an extremely high selling product for the consumers, there is an enormous gap between the beginning and end of the snake skin trade.

=== As pets ===
Many Python species, such as P. regius, P. brongersmai, P. bivittatus and M. reticulatus, are popular to keep as pets due to their ease of care, docile temperament, and vibrant colors, with some rare mutations having been sold for several thousands of dollars. Pythons in the pet trade are sourced from the wild, or from captive females that were taken from the wild ('captive-born'), or from parents that themselves were born in a captive setting ('captive-bred') Despite controversy that has arisen from media reports, with proper safety procedures pet pythons are relatively safe to own.

== Etymology ==
The word 'Python' is derived from the Latin word 'pȳthon' and the Greek word 'πύθων', both referring to Python, "the serpent slain, according to the myth, near Delphi by Apollo, who was fabled to have been called Pythius in commemoration of this victory".
