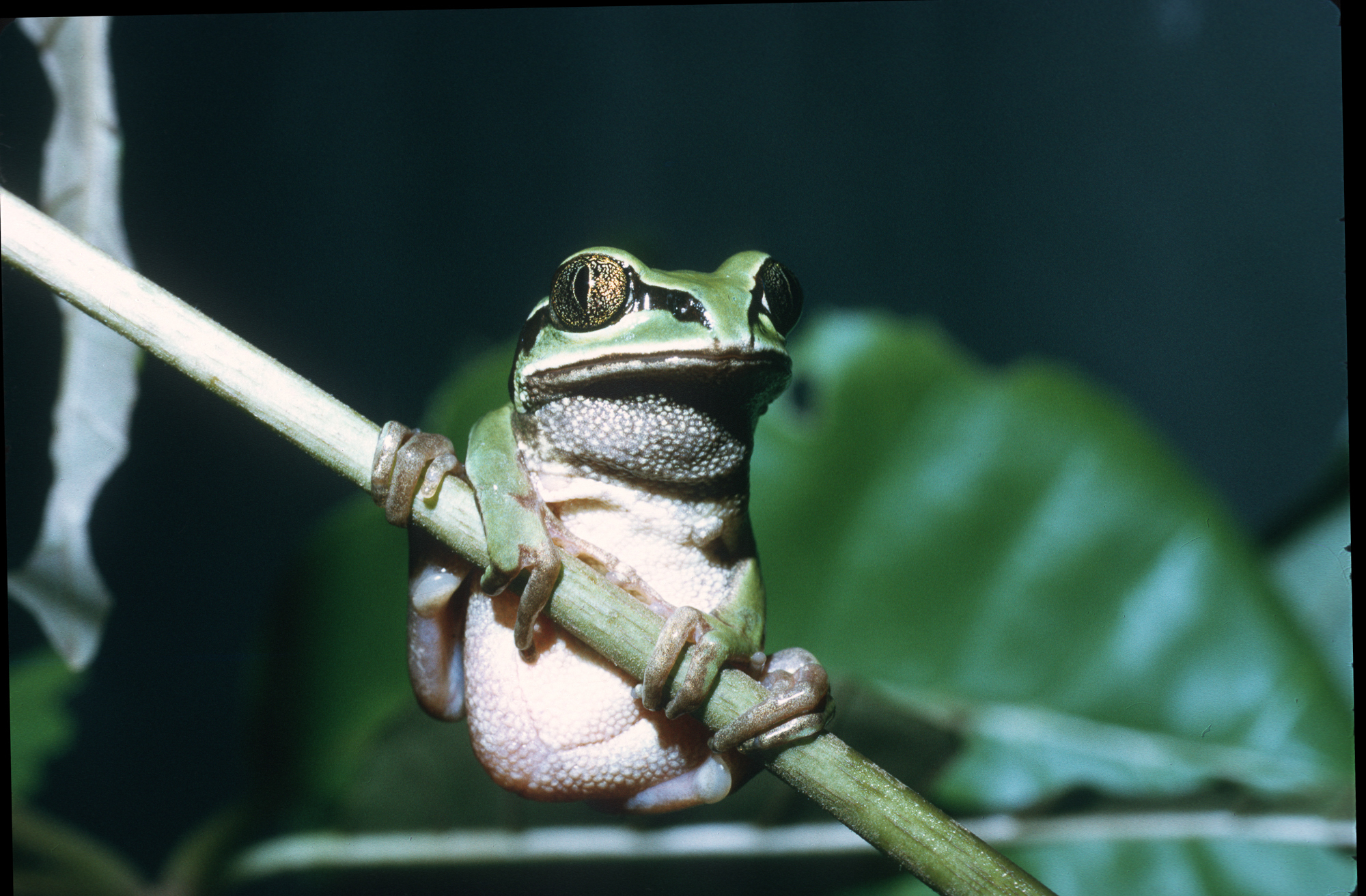

Conservation status
- Least Concern (IUCN 3.1)

Scientific classification
- Kingdom: Animalia
- Phylum: Chordata
- Class: Amphibia
- Order: Anura
- Family: Arthroleptidae
- Genus: Leptopelis
- Species: L. nordequatorialis

Binomial name
- Leptopelis nordequatorialis Perret, 1966

Synonyms
- Leptopelis anchietae nordequatorialis Perret, 1966

= Leptopelis nordequatorialis =

Species of amphibian

Leptopelis nordequatorialis, also known as the West Cameroon forest treefrog, is a species of frog in the family Arthroleptidae. It is found in central and western Cameroon (Bamileke Plateau, Bamenda Highlands, and Adamawa Plateau) and eastern Nigeria (Mambilla Plateau). It is closely related to Leptopelis anchietae and Leptopelis oryi.

== Description ==
Adult males measure 38–45 mm (1.5–1.8 in) and adult females 48–54 mm (1.9–2.1 in) in snout–vent length. The digits have neither discs nor webbing. Males have conspicuous pectoral glands. The dorsum is green and has a dark brown lateral stripe that runs from the snout to the groin. Sometimes there are rows of dark spots that form two dorsolateral lines. The tibia are short. The tadpoles reach 43 mm (1.7 in) in total length.

The male advertisement call is a very sonorous clack lasting about one tenth of a second, sometimes uttered twice.

== Habitat and conservation ==
Leptopelis nordequatorialis occurs in montane grassland and pastureland at elevations of 1,000–2,000 m (3,300–6,600 ft) above sea level. Breeding takes place in still water and marshes, and calling males have been observed at tiny springs and seepage points. It is an abundant species that can survive in highly degraded habitats; there are no serious threats to it. It has not been found in any protected areas.
