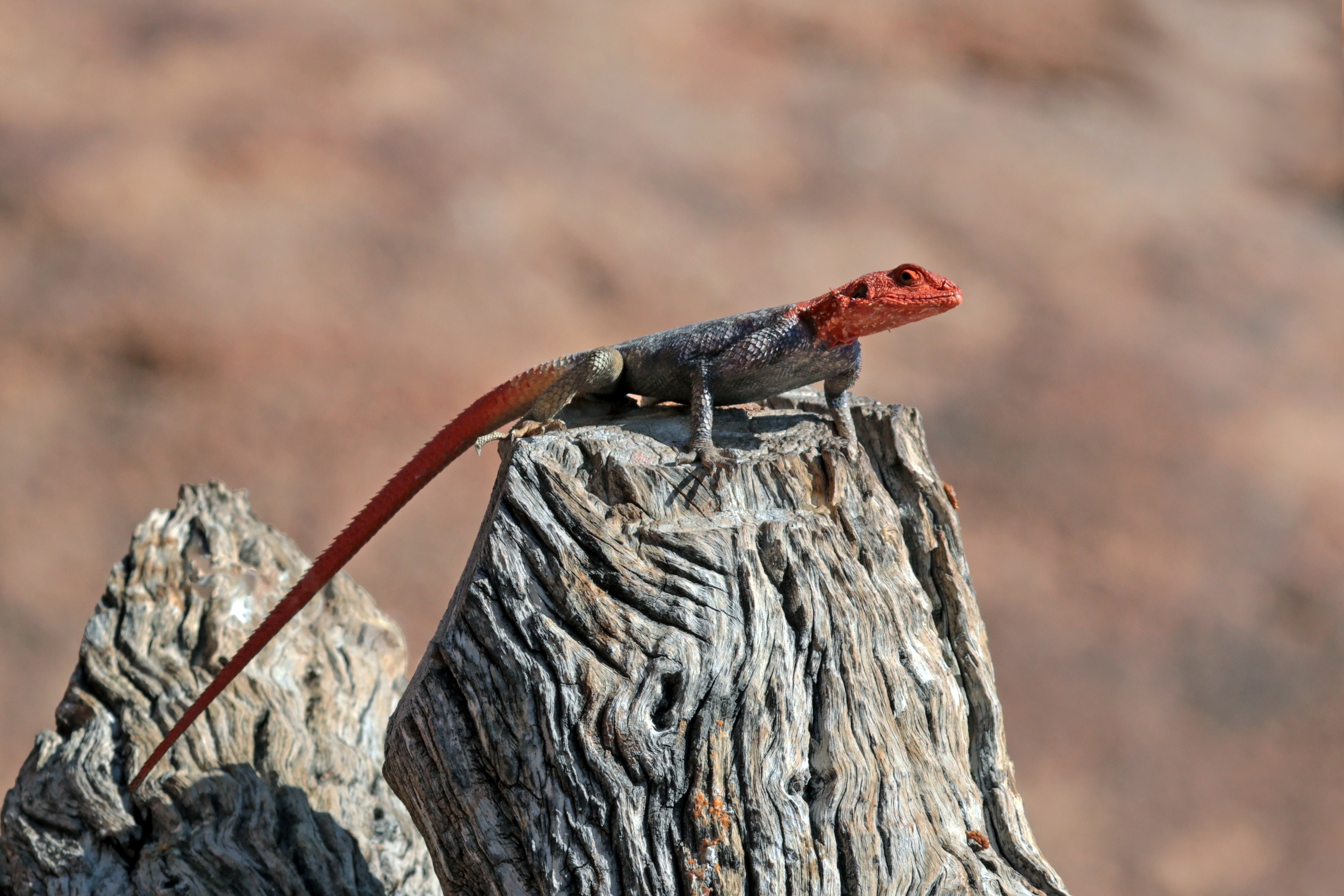
- Male
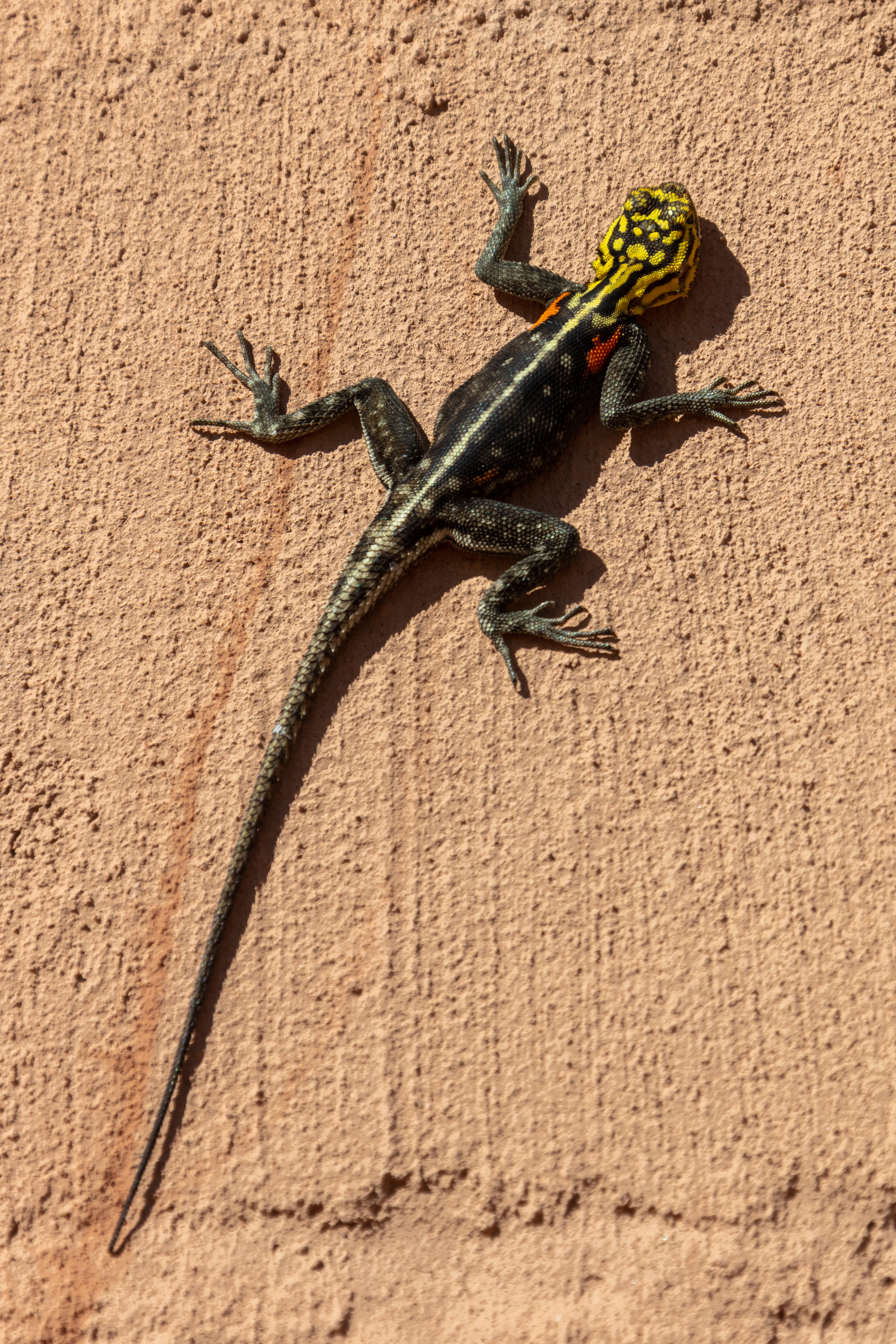
- Female; Damaraland, Namibia

Conservation status
- Least Concern (IUCN 3.1)

Scientific classification
- Kingdom: Animalia
- Phylum: Chordata
- Class: Reptilia
- Order: Squamata
- Suborder: Iguania
- Family: Agamidae
- Genus: Agama
- Species: A. planiceps

Binomial name
- Agama planiceps Peters, 1862

= Agama planiceps =

Species of lizard

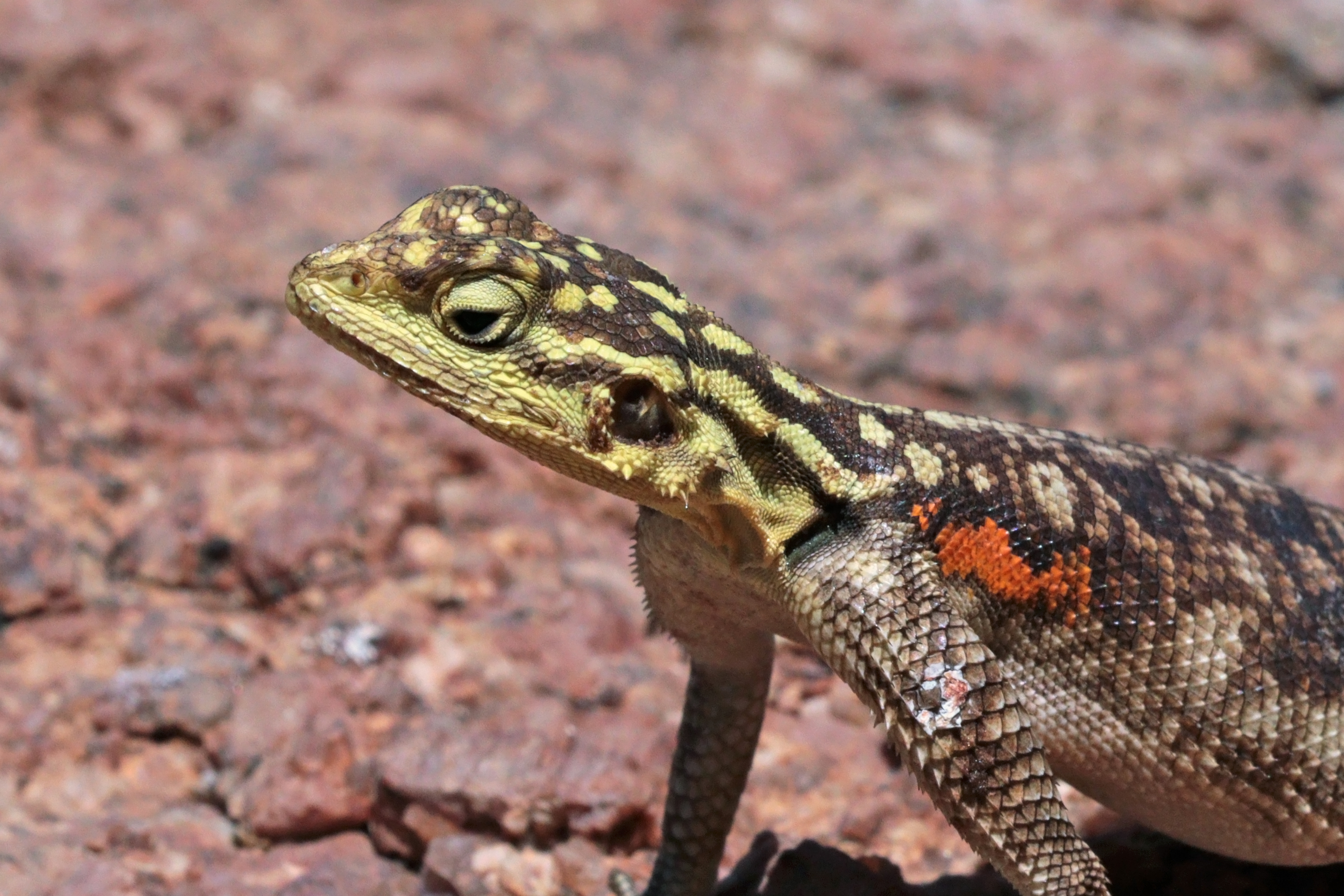
female

The Namib rock agama (Agama planiceps) is a species of agamid lizard that is native to granite rocky outcrops in northwestern Namibia and southwestern Angola.

== Range ==
They occur in Benguela and Namibe provinces of Angola, and in Damaraland and the Kaokoveld region of Namibia.

== Description ==
They exhibit a striking sexual dimorphism, with males in contrasting orange and blue colours, and the females dappled and checkered in brown, grey and yellow.

== Behaviour ==
In summer, males court females by running in circles around them while head-bobbing.

== Predation ==
The black mongoose also occurs in isolated granite kopjes of this region, and is a known predator of these agamas. The mongooses are most successful during early mornings on cold days when the agamas are less mobile. Other predators include hornbills and rock kestrels. Up to 30% of the adult agamas may have broken tails.
