= Leptopelis oryi =

Conservation status
- Least Concern (IUCN 3.1)

Scientific classification
- Kingdom: Animalia
- Phylum: Chordata
- Class: Amphibia
- Order: Anura
- Family: Arthroleptidae
- Genus: Leptopelis
- Species: L. oryi

Binomial name
- Leptopelis oryi Inger, 1968

Species of amphibian

Leptopelis oryi, also known as the Garamba forest treefrog and Ory's tree frog, is a species of frog in the family Arthroleptidae. It is found in the northeastern Democratic Republic of the Congo, northwestern Uganda, and adjacent South Sudan. It is morphologically similar to Leptopelis nordequatorialis from Cameroon, and has also been considered its synonym, but is currently treated as a distinct species. The specific name oryi honours Albert Ory, warden in the Garamba National Park, the type locality of this species.

== Description ==
Adult males measure 29–43 mm (1.1–1.7 in) and adult females 42–58 mm (1.7–2.3 in) in snout–vent length. The overall appearance is stout. The head is as wide as the body or narrower. The snout is rounded. The tympanum is distinct. The tips of the digits are dilated into distinct discs. The fingers have no webbing whereas the toes have reduced webbing. Males do not have pectoral glands (present in L. nordequatorialis). The dorsum is pale brown with three narrow darker dorsal and one dark lateral stripe. Males have pale vocal sac. The eyes are golden brown.

The male advertisement call is a single, loud, low-pitched clack.

== Habitat and conservation ==
Leptopelis oryi occurs in dense, humid savanna with tall grass and scattered bushes. In the dry season, these frogs are found buried in soil and under rocks, while during the wet season, males can be found perched high up in grass or on branches. They presumably lay eggs in a nest on the ground near water.

Leptopelis oryi is a poorly known species known from few collections, but it appears to be reasonably abundant where it has been encountered. It is present in the Garamba National Park (Democratic Republic of Congo). There is no information on specific threats to this species.
