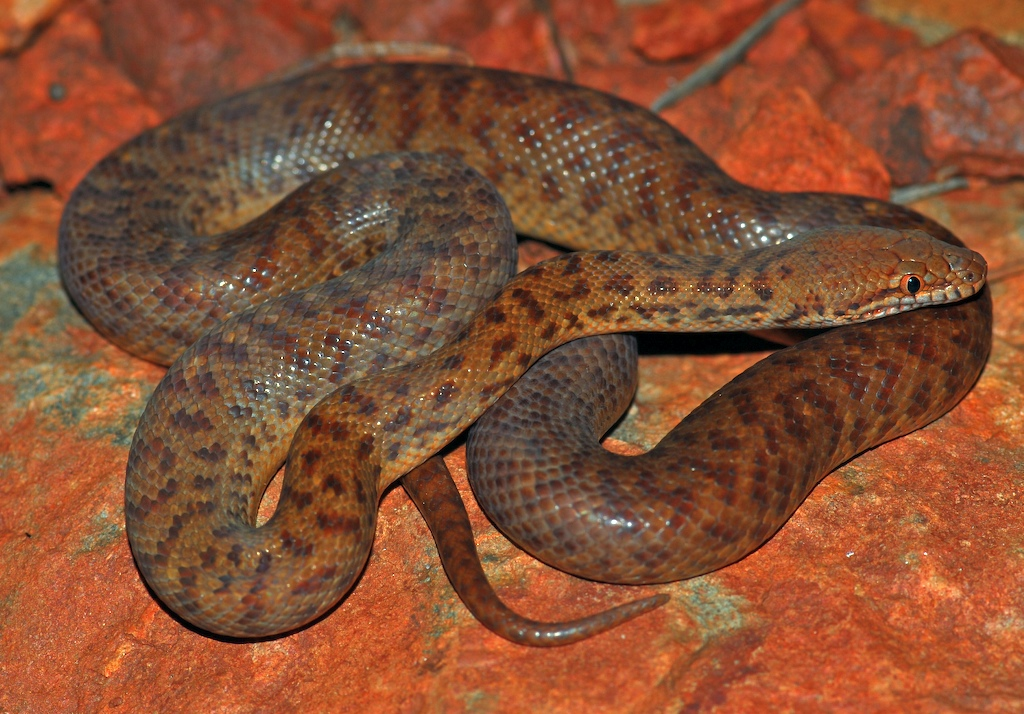

Conservation status
- Least Concern (IUCN 3.1)

Scientific classification
- Domain: Eukaryota
- Kingdom: Animalia
- Phylum: Chordata
- Class: Reptilia
- Order: Squamata
- Suborder: Serpentes
- Family: Pythonidae
- Genus: Antaresia
- Species: A. perthensis

Binomial name
- Antaresia perthensis Stull, 1932

Synonyms
- Liasis childreni perthensis - Stull, 1932; Liasis perthensis - Cogger, Cameron & Cogger, 1983; Bothrochilus perthensis - Cogger, Cameron & Cogger, 1983; Morelia perthensis - Underwood & Stimson, 1990; Liasis perthensis - Cogger, 1992; Antaresia perthensis - Kluge, 1993

= Pygmy python =

Species of snake

The pygmy python (Antaresia perthensis), also known as the anthill python, is a species of snake found in Western Australia. Their common names are due to their being the smallest member of the family Pythonidae and often being found in termite mounds. No subspecies are currently recognised.

The specific epithet is derived from the Western Australian state capital, Perth—a city which is not, ironically, within the range of the species. The global biodiversity database iNaturalist has documented a number of different visual sightings of the pygmy python within the state of Western Australia, with the nearest physical sighting to Perth having occurred near Reedy, some 680 km (422.53 mi) north and slightly further inland of the capital.

== Description ==
Adults grow to about 50 cm (19.5 in) in length and have a weight near 210 grams. Neonates are about 8 inches (20 cm) in length and about 4 grams in weight. After a year they average about 25 grams in weight. This makes them smaller than both the Children's python, A. childreni, and the spotted python, A. maculosa. A. perthensis usually has a redder background ground color than these other species and their spots fade, or become less distinct, as they mature. In contrast, the ground color is lighter in childreni and maculosa, while their spots stay better defined throughout their life.

== Distribution and habitat ==
The pygmy python is native to Australia, primarily endemic to the northwestern regions of the state of Western Australia and on some coastal islands. The type locality given is "Perth, West Australia" (Western Australia), an erroneous assumption of the place where the specimen was collected. This historical unfamiliarity of Europeans with the place of a specimen's collection has given rise to other 'naming peculiarities'. According to L.A. Smith (1985), the type locality is unknown.

The pygmy python has a number of confirmed visual sightings entered on iNaturalist (a global biodiversity website, app and nature-minded social network); sightings have been documented in and around several areas of Western Australia, including Cape Range National Park, Dampier, De Grey, East Lyons River, the Hamersley Range and Karijini National Park, Marble Bar, the Murujuga (Burrup) Peninsula, Pannawonica, Peedamulla, and Port Hedland.

== Housing ==
In captivity anthill pythons can be housed (and bred) in something as small as a 20 gallon tank. Although reptile-specific enclosures are best, a simple fish tank may be used for short- or long-term housing. They may be fed mice as part of their regular diet, supplemented with fuzzy rats. Anything larger is usually a stressor on their system, although they will still try to eat it. Once anthill pythons get started eating they rarely refuse a meal except for breeding season or during part of their shedding cycle.

== Reproduction ==
The pygmy python is oviparous, with 5-8 eggs per clutch. The females will stay coiled around the eggs (lifting them off the substrate) and incubate them until they hatch, which is usually after 50–60 days.

== In captivity ==
This snake is a popular exotic pet.
