= Cenchris =

Cenchris is a taxonomic synonym that may refer to:

- Agkistrodon, also known as moccasins, a genus of venomous vipers found in Central and North America that includes cantils, copperheads, and cottonmouths
- Candoia, or bevel-nosed boas, a genus of boas found in Melanesia and New Guinea
