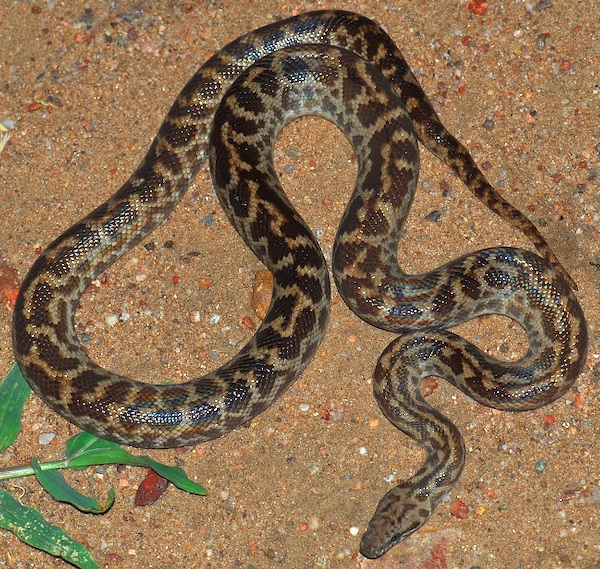

Conservation status
- Least Concern (IUCN 3.1)

Scientific classification
- Kingdom: Animalia
- Phylum: Chordata
- Class: Reptilia
- Order: Squamata
- Suborder: Serpentes
- Family: Pythonidae
- Genus: Antaresia
- Species: A. maculosa

Binomial name
- Antaresia maculosa (Peters, 1873)

Synonyms
- Liasis maculosus - Peters, 1873; Antaresia maculosus - Wells & Wellington, 1984; A[ntaresia]. maculosa - Kluge, 1993

= Spotted python =

Species of reptile

The spotted python, eastern small-blotched python, or eastern Children's python (Antaresia maculosa) is a python species found in northern Australia and New Guinea. It is a popular pet among Australian reptile enthusiasts and other reptile enthusiasts abroad due to its small size and even temperament. No subspecies were originally recognized. However, two subspecies were recognized as of 2020; A. m. maculosa and A. m. peninsularis.

The spotted pythons of New Guinea were proposed to be reclassified in 2021 as their own unique species, A. papuensis or the Papuan spotted python, in the same study that discovered the two mainland subspecies. However, both ITIS and The Reptile Database currently consider the two variants as synonyms.

== Taxonomy ==
Wilhelm Peters described the spotted python in 1873. A new subspecies, A. m. brentonoloughlini was described by Hoser (2003), but this taxon is not considered valid by other herpetologists. Two subspecies of A. maculosa were recognized in 2020; A. m. maculosa and A. m. peninsularis.

== Description ==
Adults average about 100–140 centimetres (39–55 in) in length, though a record exists of a 69 in (180 cm) specimen. It is the largest species of the genus Antaresia. It has an irregular, blotched color pattern throughout its life. The blotches have ragged edges because the dark pigmentation occurs only on complete scales. Interestingly, the largest recorded example of this species was a male, suggesting males of this species as well as others in the genus Antaresia may compete for females. This behavior has never been witnessed in the wild, and has only been witnessed in captive specimens. Combat between males in such scenarios usually consists of constriction, striking, and biting. These snakes are primarily nocturnal, and are semi-arboreal with younger animals preferring to utilize elevated hiding spots more than adults. These snakes are the oldest species within the genus Antaresia, having diverged from other species in the genus 27 million years ago.

== Distribution and habitat ==
Found in Australia from the extreme north of the Cape York Peninsula, south through eastern Queensland to northern New South Wales. Also on many islands off the coast of Queensland. The type locality given is "Rockhampton, Port Mackay, Port Bowen [= Port Clinton]" [Queensland, Australia]. L.A. Smith (1985) restricted the type locality to "Port Mackay" (Mackay, Queensland, in 21° 09'S, 149° 11'E) by lectotype designation. Antaresia maculosa has also been recorded from the southern Trans-Fly region of Papua New Guinea, at Weam in Western Province and there are concerns it may be being exploited for the pet trade across the border in Indonesian West New Guinea. Found in most types of habitats, but prefers rocky hillsides and outcrops with crevices and caves. The Papua specimen was found behind discarded corrugated tin sheets beside a disused airstrip in Eucalypt savanna-woodland habitat dotted with numerous termite mounds.

== Feeding ==
One of its favorite foods are the insectivorous bats that it catches at the entrance of their caves. Being the largest members of this genus, captive specimens will usually accept mice and other small rodents. They also frequently feed on other reptile species such as the local gecko, Dubious dtella.

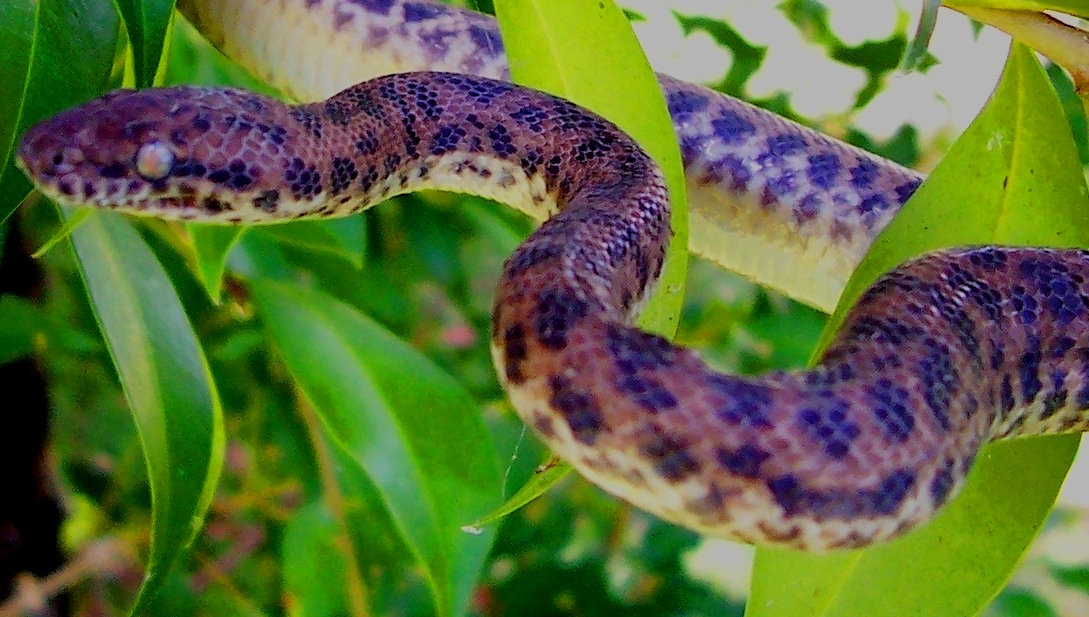
Spotted Pythons are often mistaken for the Children's python.

== Reproduction ==
The spotted python is oviparous, with females laying up to 15 eggs in a clutch.

== In captivity ==
Spotted pythons are often kept as pets due to their small size, docile temperaments, strong feeding responses, resiliency and easy captive care. They and other species in the genus Antaresia are often seen as a good beginner species for keeping reptiles, particularly snakes. While not as popular or diverse in colors as ball pythons, these snakes can range in color from albino and leucistic to ebony, melanistic, and piebald color morphs to name a few. The few known leucistic individuals that have been documented were wild individuals released back into their native habitat after capture, leaving some python breeders disappointed by the lost opportunities to create different captive strains of these animals. The varying coloration between individuals also makes them quite attractive to many herpetoculturalists who work with and breed exotic reptiles. In captivity, this species are very tolerant of differing humidity levels ranging from 20%-80% due to the wide range of habitats they occur in throughout their range, and shedding problems that occur in captive animals are usually the result of temperatures being too high or low rather than problems with humidity. Spotted pythons are also fairly easy to breed, though some individuals (mostly males) may refuse to eat for a few weeks when they are interested in mating.
