= Enygrus =

Enygrus (a taxonomic synonym) may refer to:

- Python (genus), a.k.a. pythons, a genus of non-venomous snakes found in Africa and Asia
- Candoia, a.k.a. bevel-nosed boas, a genus of non-venomous snakes found in Melanesia and New Guinea
