= Samuel B. McDowell =

American herpetologist

- Born: Samuel Booker McDowell Jr. September 13, 1928
- Died: December 31, 2014 (aged 86)
- Education: Columbia University; B.Sc. (1947); Ph.D. (1957)
- Scientific career
- Fields: Herpetology
- Workplaces: AMNH
- Author abbrev. (zoology): McDowell

Samuel Booker McDowell Jr. (1928–2014) was an American herpetologist who worked on the comparative anatomy of turtles and snakes, and studied snakes of Oceania.

McDowell earned a B.Sc. (1947) and a Ph.D. (1957) from Columbia University, and worked at the American Museum of Natural History. His zoological author abbreviation is McDowell. Several snakes are named in his honor.

In addition to his scientific work, McDowell was a friend of New Yorker writer A.J. Liebling, and an occasional contributor to the magazine in the early 1960s.

== Some taxa authored ==
- Acrochordus arafurae
- Emydinae
- Pseudoxenodontinae
- Salomonelaps

== Eponyms ==
The following four snakes are named in honor of McDowell.

- Hydrophis macdowelli Kharin, 1983
- Tropidonophis mcdowelli Malnate & Underwood, 1988
- Gerrhopilus mcdowelli (Wallach, 1996)
- Candoia paulsoni mcdowelli H.M. Smith & Chiszar, 2001

Nota bene: A binomial authority in parentheses indicates that the species was originally described in a different genus.

== Selected publications ==
- McDowell, Samuel Booker (2010). "The genera of sea-snakes of the Hydrophis group(Serpentes: Elapidae)". Transactions of the Zoological Society of London. 32 (3): 189–247. doi:10.1111/j.1096-3642.1972.tb00028.x. Wikidata Q99966086.
- McDowell, Samuel Booker (2009). "On the status and relationships of the Solomon Island elapid snakes". Journal of Zoology. 161 (2): 145–190. doi:10.1111/j.1469-7998.1970.tb02032.x. Wikidata Q29030857.
- McDowell, Samuel Booker (2009). "Toxicocalamus, a New Guinea genus of snakes of the family Elapidae". Journal of Zoology. 159 (4): 443–511. doi:10.1111/j.1469-7998.1969.tb03900.x. Wikidata Q55868153.
- McDowell, Samuel Booker; H. G. Cogger (2009). "Aspidomorphus, a genus of New Guinea snakes of the Family Elapidae, with notes on related genera". Journal of Zoology: Proceedings of the Zoological Society of London. 151 (4): 497–543. doi:10.1111/j.1469-7998.1967.tb02130.x. Wikidata Q99966085.
- T. Lamb; J. W. Bickham; J. W. Gibbons; M. J. Smolen; S. McDowell (1991). "Genetic damage in a population of slider turtles (Trachemys scripta) inhabiting a radioactive reservoir" (PDF). Archives of Environmental Contamination and Toxicology. 20 (1): 138–142. doi:10.1007/bf01065340. PMID 1996906. Wikidata Q68201288.
- McDowell, Samuel Booker; R. Longmore (1987). "Atlas of Elapid Snakes of Australia". Copeia (in Spanish). 1987 (3): 824. doi:10.2307/1445691. Wikidata Q95637275.
