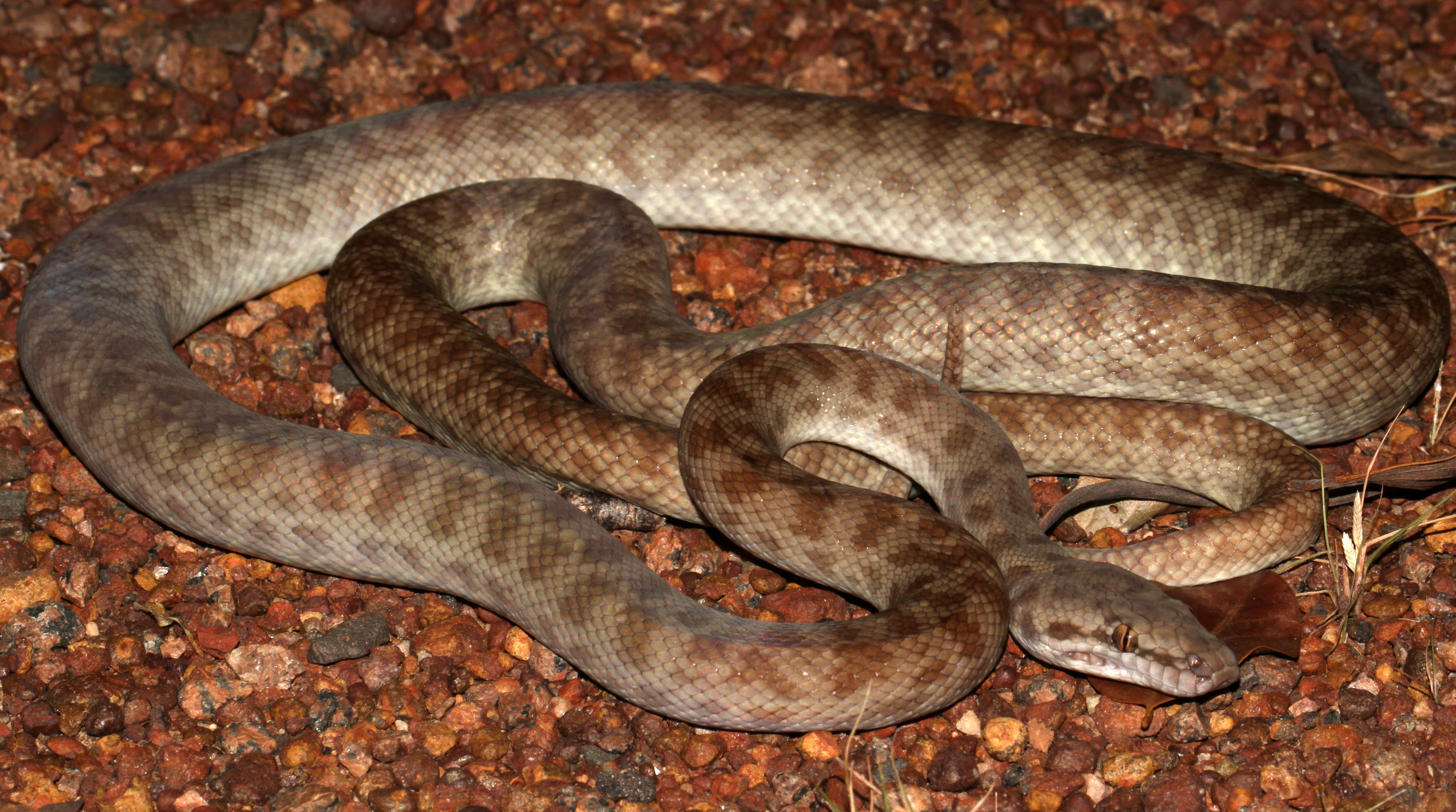
- Children's python, A. childreni

Scientific classification
- Kingdom: Animalia
- Phylum: Chordata
- Class: Reptilia
- Order: Squamata
- Suborder: Serpentes
- Family: Pythonidae
- Subfamily: Pythoninae
- Genus: Antaresia; Wells & Wellington, 1984

Type species
- Antaresia childreni

Species
- Four species and two subspecies, see text.

Synonyms
- Antaresia Wells & Wellington, 1984

= Antaresia =

Genus of snakes

Antaresia is a genus of pythons, nonvenomous snakes in the family Pythonidae. The genus is native to Australasia. The genus is known by the common name Children's pythons, the name of the type species, Antaresia childreni. John Edward Gray named A. childreni in honour of his mentor, John George Children, who was a curator of the zoological collection at the British Museum around that time. It contains the smallest members of the Pythonidae. Four species and two subspecies are recognized, although they were all considered part of the same species until recently. A newly described form called the pygmy banded python may be a distinct species, but analysis has not yet been performed on this animal. The largest recorded examples of Antaresia species have all been males, suggesting males of the known species in this genus may compete for females. This behavior has never been witnessed in the wild, and has only been witnessed in captive specimens.

== Geographic range ==
Species in the genus Antaresia are found in Australia, Indonesia, and Papua New Guinea, in arid and tropical regions.

== Species ==
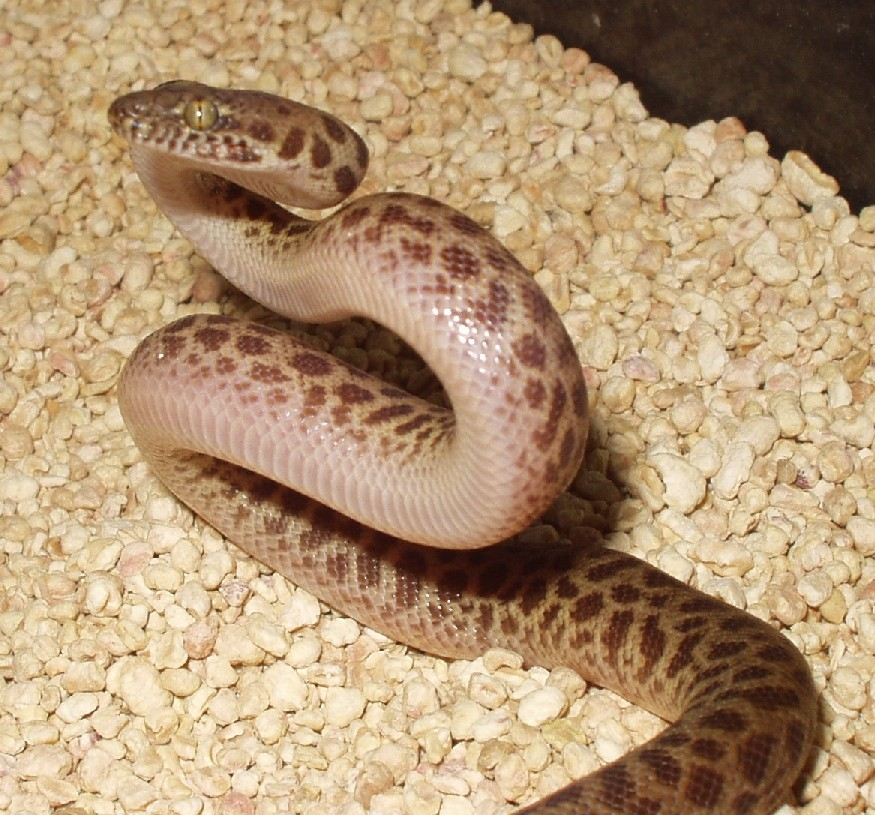
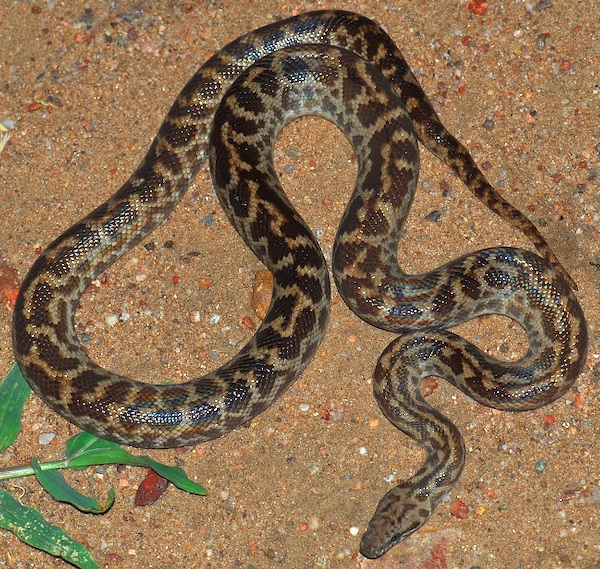
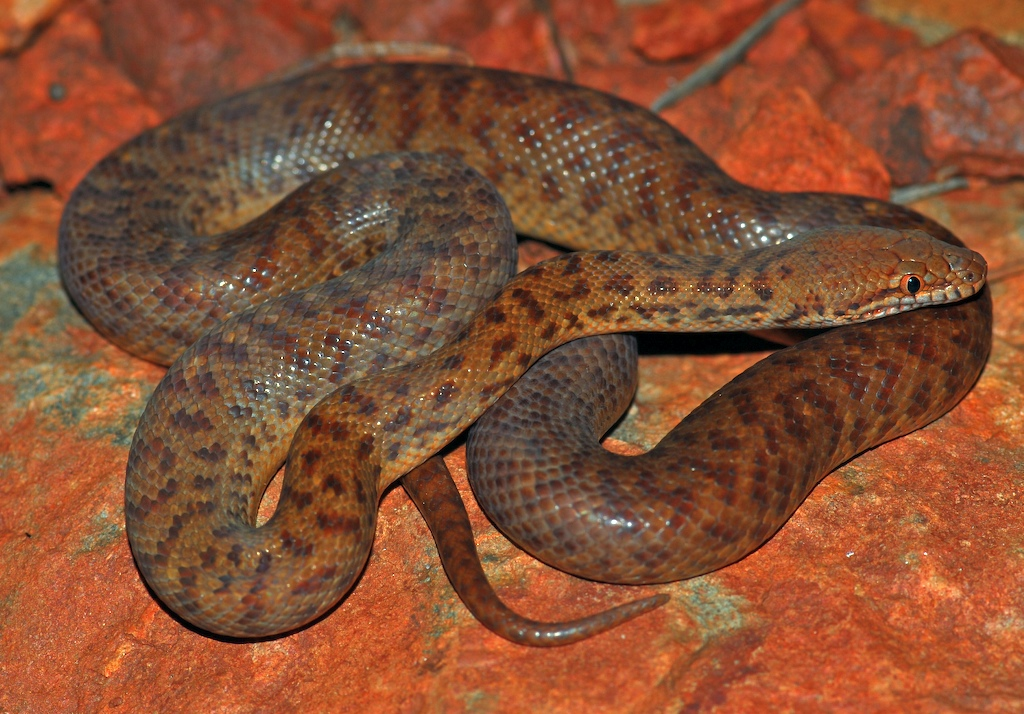
Species	Taxon author	Common name	Geographic range
A. childreni^{T}	(Gray, 1842)	Children's python	Australia in the extreme north of Western Australia, the northern third of Northern Territory, and northeastern Queensland, and on the islands of the Torres Strait
A. maculosa	(W. Peters, 1873)	spotted python	Australia from the extreme north of the Cape York Peninsula, south through eastern Queensland to northern New South Wales, and on many islands off the coast of Queensland
A. papuensis	(Esquerré, 2021)	Papuan spotted python	New Guinea and Torres Strait
A. perthensis	(Stull, 1932)	pygmy python	Australia in the northwest of Western Australia, including some coastal islands

- ) A taxon author in parentheses indicates that the species was originally described in a genus other than Antaresia.

^{T}) Type species.

== Taxonomy ==
The generic name, Antaresia, is taken from the star Antares in the constellation Scorpius. The generic name was created in 1984 by Wells and Wellington in a revision of Children's pythons, those previously described as a single species in the genus Liasis. Despite a petition to suppress the taxonomic work of these authors, it gained wide acceptance and publication in 1991.

Four species and two subspecies are currently recognized in the genus Antaresia, which is contained by the family Pythonidae; infraspecific ranks have also been described.

A subspecies, A. stimsoni orientalis was described by L.A. Smith (1985), but was not recognized as valid by Barker & Barker (1994). It is now recognized as valid by ITIS, as well as A. stimsoni stimsoni.

.

== In captivity ==
The members of the genus Antaresia are often kept as pets due to their small size, docile temperaments, strong feeding responses, resiliency and easy captive care. They are often seen as a good beginner species for keeping reptiles, particularly snakes. While not as popular or diverse in colors as ball pythons, these snakes can range in color from albino and leucistic to ebony, melanistic, and piebald color morphs to name a few. The varying coloration between individuals also makes them quite attractive to many who work with and breed exotic reptiles. In captivity, the members of this genus are very tolerant of differing humidity levels ranging from 20%-80% due to the wide range of habitats they occur in, and shedding problems that occur in captive animals are usually the result of temperatures being too high or low rather than problems with humidity. Antaresia species are also fairly easy to breed, though some individuals (mostly males) may refuse to eat when they are interested in mating.
