= Candoia bibroni australis =

Scientific classification
- Domain: Eukaryota
- Kingdom: Animalia
- Phylum: Chordata
- Class: Reptilia
- Order: Squamata
- Suborder: Serpentes
- Family: Boidae
- Genus: Candoia
- Species: C. bibroni
- Subspecies: C. b. australis

Trinomial name
- Candoia bibroni australis (Montrouzier, 1860)

Synonyms
- Boa australis Montrouzier, 1860; Enygrus australis — Boulenger, 1893; Enygrus bibroni australis — Sarasin & Roux, 1913; Candoia bibronii australis — Forcart, 1951; Candoia bibroni australis — Stimson, 1969

Subspecies of snake

Candoia bibroni australis, commonly known as the Solomon Island tree boa, is a boa subspecies endemic to the Solomon Islands. Like all other boas, it is not venomous.

== Description ==
Adults can grow up to 2 to 5 feet (0.6 to 1.5 m) in total length (including tail). Mature females are typically much larger than the males. Longevity is 10 years or more.

== Geographic range ==
Found in the Solomon Islands.

The type locality given is "Nouvelle-Calédonie" (New Caledonia).

== Feeding ==
The young will prey on small frogs and lizards, while adults will feed on larger prey such as smaller rodents.
