= Painted keelback =

There are two species of snake named painted keelback:

- Xenochrophis cerasogaster, found in Pakistan, Nepal, Bangladesh, and India
- Tropidonophis picturatus, found in Indonesia
