= Tropidonophis parkeri =

Conservation status
- Least Concern (IUCN 3.1)

Scientific classification
- Kingdom: Animalia
- Phylum: Chordata
- Class: Reptilia
- Order: Squamata
- Suborder: Serpentes
- Family: Colubridae
- Genus: Tropidonophis
- Species: T. parkeri

Binomial name
- Tropidonophis parkeri Malnate & Underwood, 1988

Species of snake

Tropidonophis parkeri, also known commonly as the highland keelback and Parker's keelback, is a species of snake in the subfamily Natricinae of the family Colubridae. The species is endemic to Papua New Guinea.

== Etymology ==
The specific name, parkeri, is in honor of English zoologist Hampton Wildman Parker.

== Habitat ==
The preferred natural habitat of Tropidonophis parker is freshwater wetlands, at elevations of 1,070–2,130 m (3,510–6,990 ft).

== Diet ==
Tropidonophis parkeri preys predominately upon frogs of the genera Cophixalus, Papurana, and Xenorhina.

== Reproduction ==
Tropidonophis parkeri is oviparous.
