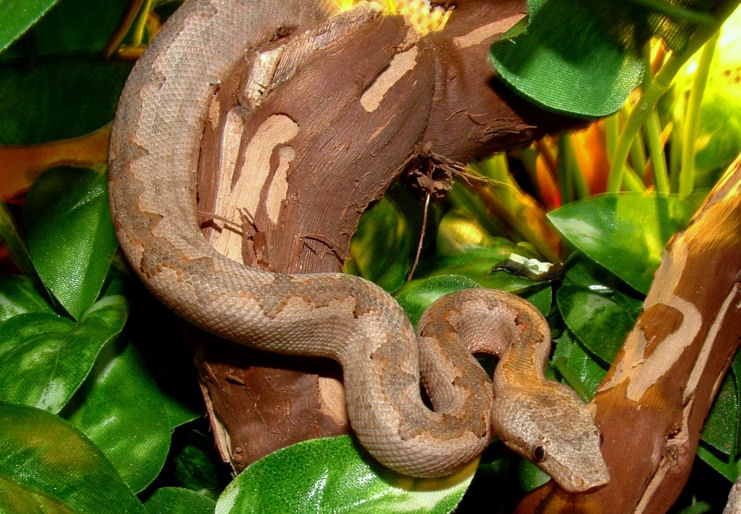

Conservation status
- Least Concern (IUCN 3.1)

Scientific classification
- Kingdom: Animalia
- Phylum: Chordata
- Class: Reptilia
- Order: Squamata
- Suborder: Serpentes
- Family: Boidae
- Genus: Candoia
- Species: C. carinata

Binomial name
- Candoia carinata (Schneider, 1801)

Synonyms
- Boa carinata Schneider, 1801; Candoia carinata — Gray, 1842; Enygrus carinatus — A.M.C. Duméril & Bibron, 1844; Candoia carinata — Stimson, 1969

= Candoia carinata =

Species of snake

Candoia carinata, known commonly as the Pacific ground boa, Pacific keel-scaled boa, and Indonesian tree boa, is a species of snake in the subfamily Candoiinae of the family Boidae. The species is native to parts of Southeast Asia and Oceania. There are two recognized subspecies.

== Distribution and habitat ==
Candoia carinata is found in Indonesia, New Guinea, and the Bismarck Archipelago.

== In captivity ==
Candoia carinata is kept as a pet in Indonesia, where it is known by the common name monopohon (pohon means "tree" in the Indonesian language).

== Subspecies ==
=== Candoia carinata carinata (Schneider, 1801) ===
While the nominate subspecies, C. c. carinata, may be occasionally found in trees, this Papuan snake is most often found on the ground.

=== Candoia carinata tepedeleni (H.M. Smith & Chiszar, 2001) ===
Commonly known as Tepedelen's bevel-nosed boa.

== Etymology ==
The subspecific name, tepedeleni, is in honour of herpetologist species:Kumaran Tepedelen.
