= Tropidonophis mcdowelli =

Conservation status
- Least Concern (IUCN 3.1)

Scientific classification
- Kingdom: Animalia
- Phylum: Chordata
- Class: Reptilia
- Order: Squamata
- Suborder: Serpentes
- Family: Colubridae
- Genus: Tropidonophis
- Species: T. mcdowelli

Binomial name
- Tropidonophis mcdowelli Malnate & Underwood, 1988

Species of snake

Tropidonophis mcdowelli, also known commonly as the northern New Guinea keelback, is a species of snake in the subfamily Natricinae of the family Colubridae. The species is native to northern New Guinea in both Papua New Guinea and Western New Guinea.

== Etymology ==
Its specific name, mcdowelli, is in honor of American herpetologist Samuel B. McDowell.

== Description ==
Tropidonophis mcdowelli has pits on the head shields anterior to the parietals. It also has a high number of subcaudals, 75–95.

== Habitat ==
The preferred natural habitat of Tropidonophis mcdowelli is lowland and montane rainforest at elevations of 579–1,885 m (1,900–6,184 ft) above sea level in association with watercourses.

== Diet ==
Tropidonophis mcdowelli preys predominately upon frogs.

== Reproduction ==
Tropidonophis mcdowelli is oviparous.
