= Tropidonophis statisticus =

Scientific classification
- Kingdom: Animalia
- Phylum: Chordata
- Class: Reptilia
- Order: Squamata
- Suborder: Serpentes
- Family: Colubridae
- Genus: Tropidonophis
- Species: T. statisticus

Binomial name
- Tropidonophis statisticus Malnate & Underwood, 1988

Species of snake

Tropidonophis statisticus, the Papua New Guinea montane keelback, is a species of colubrid snake. It is found in Papua New Guinea and Indonesia.
