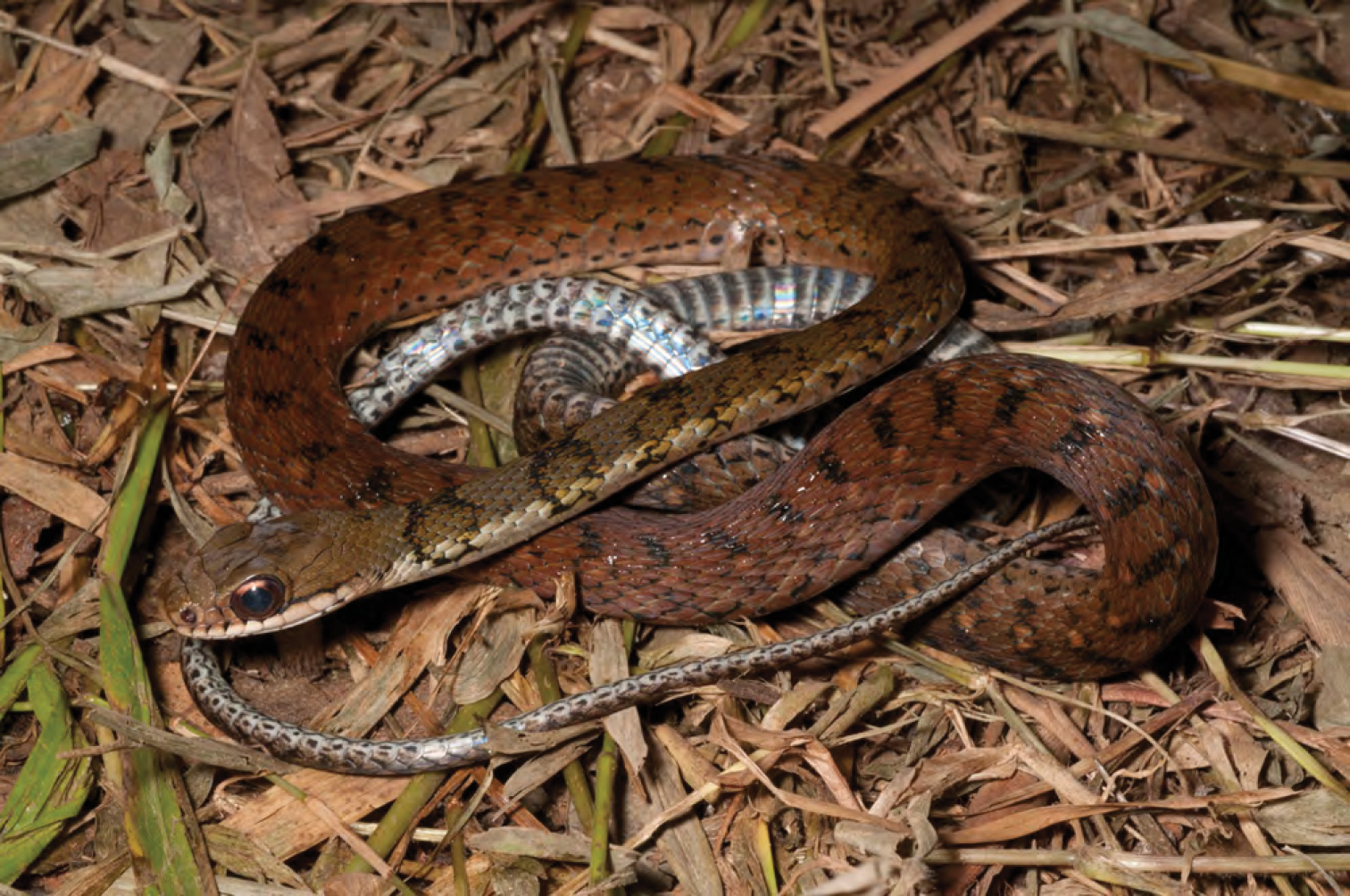

Conservation status
- Least Concern (IUCN 3.1)

Scientific classification
- Kingdom: Animalia
- Phylum: Chordata
- Class: Reptilia
- Order: Squamata
- Suborder: Serpentes
- Family: Colubridae
- Genus: Tropidonophis
- Species: T. dendrophiops

Binomial name
- Tropidonophis dendrophiops (Günther, 1883)

= Tropidonophis dendrophiops =

Species of snake

Tropidonophis dendrophiops, the spotted water snake, is a species of colubrid snake. It is found in the Philippines.
