= Tropidonophis punctiventris =

Conservation status
- Endangered (IUCN 3.1)

Scientific classification
- Kingdom: Animalia
- Phylum: Chordata
- Class: Reptilia
- Order: Squamata
- Suborder: Serpentes
- Family: Colubridae
- Genus: Tropidonophis
- Species: T. punctiventris

Binomial name
- Tropidonophis punctiventris (Boettger, 1895)

Species of snake

Tropidonophis punctiventris the Halmahera keelback, is a species of colubrid snake. It is found in Indonesia.
