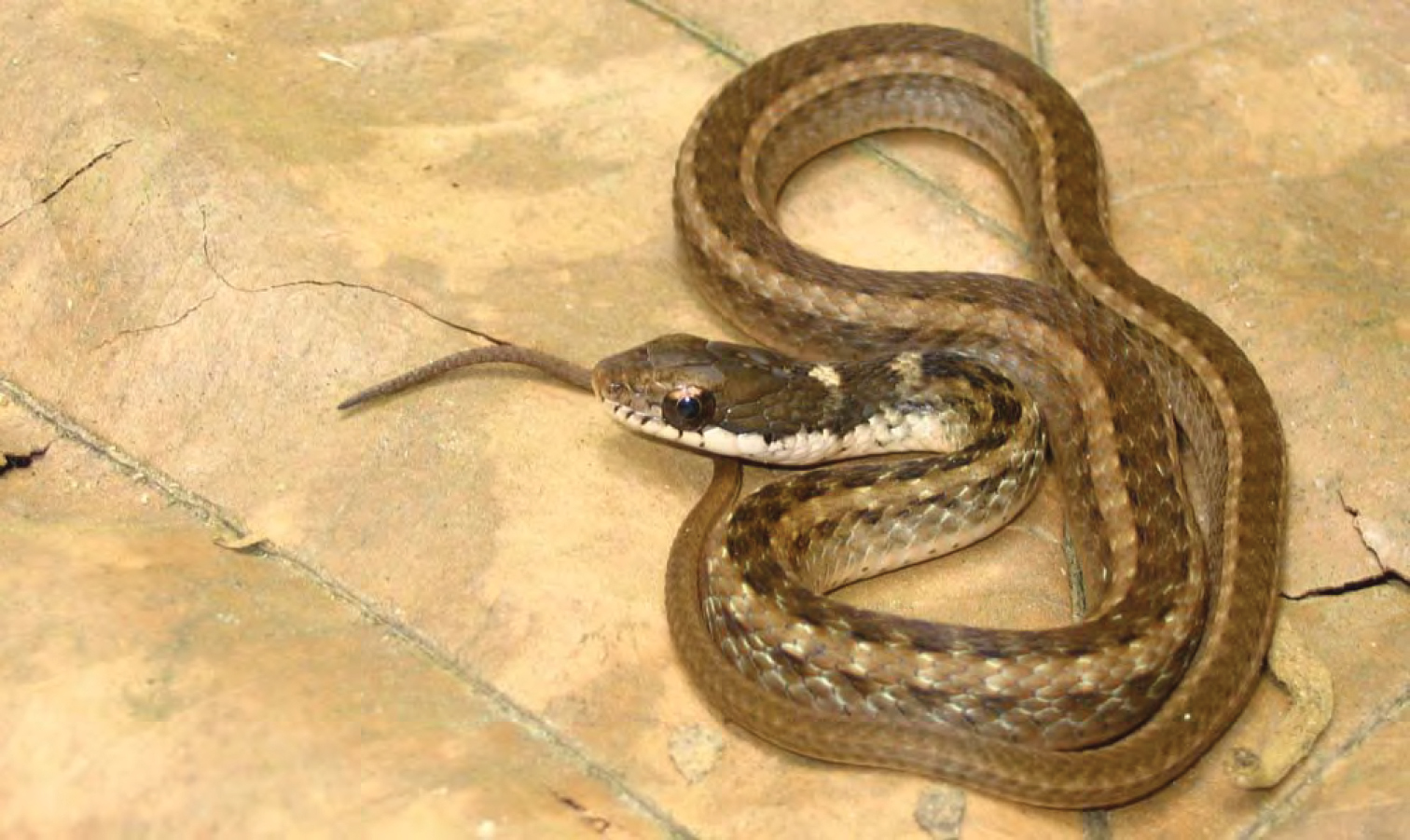

Conservation status
- Least Concern (IUCN 3.1)

Scientific classification
- Kingdom: Animalia
- Phylum: Chordata
- Class: Reptilia
- Order: Squamata
- Suborder: Serpentes
- Family: Colubridae
- Genus: Tropidonophis
- Species: T. spilogaster

Binomial name
- Tropidonophis spilogaster (Boie, 1827)

Synonyms
- Tropidonotus spilogaster Boie, 1827 Tropidonotus crebripunctatus Wiegmann, 1835

= Tropidonophis spilogaster =

Species of snake

Tropidonophis spilogaster, commonly known as the northern water snake or Boie's keelback, is a keelback snake in the family Colubridae found in the Philippines on the islands of Catanduanes, Polillo, Calayan and in the province of Bataan on the island of Luzon. The snake's venom toxicity is unknown due to lack of study.
