= Tropidonophis novaeguineae =

Conservation status
- Least Concern (IUCN 3.1)

Scientific classification
- Kingdom: Animalia
- Phylum: Chordata
- Class: Reptilia
- Order: Squamata
- Suborder: Serpentes
- Family: Colubridae
- Genus: Tropidonophis
- Species: T. novaeguineae

Binomial name
- Tropidonophis novaeguineae (Lidth de Jeude, 1911)

Species of snake

Tropidonophis novaeguineae, the New Guinea keelback, is a species of colubrid snake. It is found in New Guinea.
