= Tropidonophis dolasii =

Conservation status
- Data Deficient (IUCN 3.1)

Scientific classification
- Kingdom: Animalia
- Phylum: Chordata
- Class: Reptilia
- Order: Squamata
- Suborder: Serpentes
- Family: Colubridae
- Genus: Tropidonophis
- Species: T. dolasii

Binomial name
- Tropidonophis dolasii Kraus & Allison, 2004

Species of snake

Tropidonophis dolasii is a species of snake in the subfamily Natricinae of the family Colubridae. The species is endemic to Papua New Guinea.

== Etymology ==
The specific name, dolasii, is in honor of Papua New Guinean, Dolasi Salepuna, for his field assistance.

== Habitat ==
The preferred natural habitat of Tropidonophis dolasii is forest in association with freshwater wetlands, at altitudes of 900–1,090 m (2,950–3,580 ft).

== Diet ==
Tropidonophis dolasii preys upon frogs.

== Reproduction ==
Tropidonophis dolasii is oviparous.
