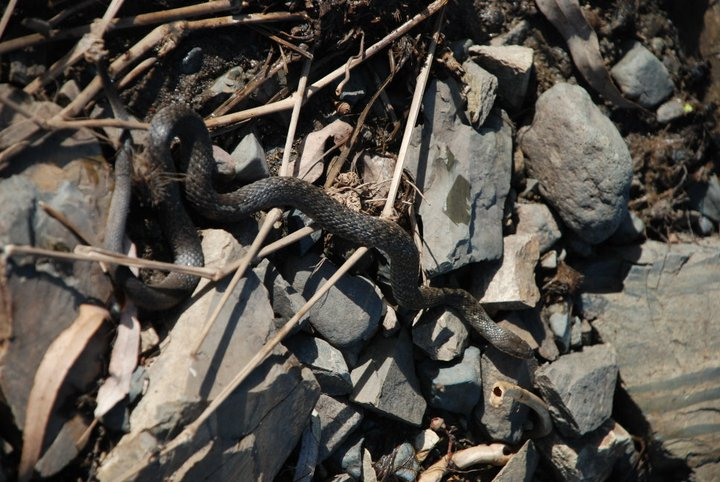
- Tropidonophis mairii

Scientific classification
- Kingdom: Animalia
- Phylum: Chordata
- Class: Reptilia
- Order: Squamata
- Suborder: Serpentes
- Family: Colubridae
- Subfamily: Natricinae
- Genus: Tropidonophis; Jan, 1863

= Tropidonophis =

Genus of snakes

Tropidonophis is a genus of snakes in the subfamily Natricinae of the family Colubridae.

== Species ==
The following 20 species are recognized as being valid.

- Tropidonophis aenigmaticus Malnate & Underwood, 1988 – East Papuan keelback,
- Tropidonophis dahlii (F. Werner, 1899) – New Britain keelback
- Tropidonophis dendrophiops (Günther, 1883) – spotted water snake
- Tropidonophis dolasii Kraus & Allison, 2004
- Tropidonophis doriae (Boulenger, 1897) – barred keelback
- Tropidonophis elongatus (Jan, 1865) – Moluccan keelback
- Tropidonophis halmahericus (Boettger, 1895)
- Tropidonophis hypomelas (Günther, 1877) – Bismarck keelback
- Tropidonophis mairii (Gray, 1841) – common keelback, Mair's keelback
- Tropidonophis mcdowelli Malnate & Underwood, 1988 – Northern New Guinea keelback
- Tropidonophis montanus (Lidth de Jeude, 1911) – North Irian montane keelback
- Tropidonophis multiscutellatus (Brongersma, 1948) – many-scaled keelback
- Tropidonophis negrosensis (Taylor, 1917) – Negros spotted water snake
- Tropidonophis novaeguineae (Lidth De Jeude, 1911) – New Guinea keelback
- Tropidonophis parkeri Malnate & Underwood, 1988 – Parker's keelback, highland keelback
- Tropidonophis picturatus (Schlegel, 1837) – painted keelback
- Tropidonophis punctiventris (Boettger, 1895) – Halmahera keelback
- Tropidonophis spilogaster (Boie, 1827) – Boie's keelback
- Tropidonophis statisticus Malnate & Underwood, 1988 – Papua New Guinea montane keelback
- Tropidonophis truncatus (W. Peters, 1863)

Nota bene: A binomial authority in parentheses indicates that the species was originally described in a genus other than Tropidonophis.
