= Tropidonophis multiscutellatus =

Conservation status
- Least Concern (IUCN 3.1)

Scientific classification
- Kingdom: Animalia
- Phylum: Chordata
- Class: Reptilia
- Order: Squamata
- Suborder: Serpentes
- Family: Colubridae
- Genus: Tropidonophis
- Species: T. multiscutellatus

Binomial name
- Tropidonophis multiscutellatus (Brongersma, 1948)

Species of snake

Tropidonophis multiscutellatus, the many-scaled keelback, is a species of colubrid snake. It is found in Papua New Guinea and Indonesia.
