= Tropidonophis dahlii =

Conservation status
- Least Concern (IUCN 3.1)

Scientific classification
- Kingdom: Animalia
- Phylum: Chordata
- Class: Reptilia
- Order: Squamata
- Suborder: Serpentes
- Family: Colubridae
- Genus: Tropidonophis
- Species: T. dahlii

Binomial name
- Tropidonophis dahlii (F. Werner, 1899)

Synonyms
- Tropidonotus (Macropophis) dahlii F. Werner, 1899; Tropidonotus hypomelas Sternfeld, 1913 (part); Tropidonotus (Macropophis) melanocephalus F. Werner, 1925; Natrix melanocephala — Loveridge, 1948; Macropophis hypomela — Malnate, 1960 (part); Macropophis melanocephala — Malnate, 1960 (part); Tropidonophis dahlii — Malnate & Underwood, 1988

Species of snake

Tropidonophis dahlii, also known commonly as the New Britain keelback, is a species of snake in the subfamily Natricinae of the family Colubridae. The species is native to Indonesia and Papua New Guinea.

== Etymology ==
The specific name, dahlii, is in honor of German zoologist Karl Theodor Friedrich Dahl.

== Habitat ==
The preferred natural habitat of Tropidonophis dahlii is forest near streams, at altitudes of 760–1,070 m (2,490–3,510 ft).

== Reproduction ==
Tropidonophis dahlii is oviparous.
