= Tropidonophis halmahericus =

Conservation status
- Least Concern (IUCN 3.1)

Scientific classification
- Kingdom: Animalia
- Phylum: Chordata
- Class: Reptilia
- Order: Squamata
- Suborder: Serpentes
- Family: Colubridae
- Genus: Tropidonophis
- Species: T. halmahericus

Binomial name
- Tropidonophis halmahericus (Boettger, 1895)

Species of snake

Tropidonophis halmahericus is a species of colubrid snake. It is found in Indonesia.
