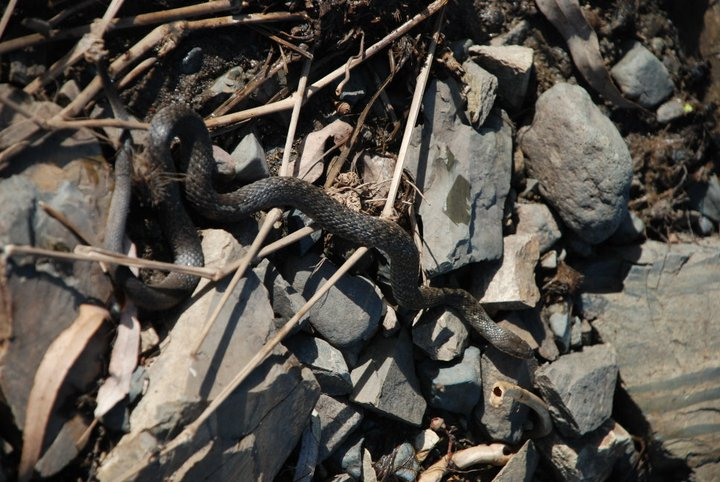

Conservation status
- Least Concern (IUCN 3.1)

Scientific classification
- Kingdom: Animalia
- Phylum: Chordata
- Class: Reptilia
- Order: Squamata
- Suborder: Serpentes
- Family: Colubridae
- Genus: Tropidonophis
- Species: T. mairii

Binomial name
- Tropidonophis mairii (Gray, 1841)

Synonyms
- Tropidonotus mairii Gray, 1841; Natrix mairii — Worrell, 1946; Amphiesma mairii — Cogger & Lindner, 1974; Styporhynchus mairii — Cogger, 1983; Tropidonophis mairii — Malnate & Underwood, 1988

= Tropidonophis mairii =

Common keelback

Species of snake

Tropidonophis mairii, also known commonly as Mair's keelback, the common keelback, and the freshwater snake, is a species of colubrid snake in the subfamily Natricinae. The species is native to Australasia.

== Etymology ==
The specific name, mairii, is in honor of "Dr. Mair", an army surgeon with the 39th Regiment of Foot, who collected the holotype.

== Geographic range ==
Tropidonophis mairii is found in Australia, Indonesia, and Papua New Guinea.

== Habitat ==
The preferred natural habitats of Tropidonophis mairii are forest, grassland, and freshwater wetlands, at altitudes from sea level to 50 m (160 ft).

== Description ==
Dorsally, Tropidonophis mairii is olive, brown, or blackish, with small black spots, or with black crossbars anteriorly. Ventrally, it is lighter. The subcaudals and often also the ventrals are edged with black. The dorsal scales are strongly keeled, and arranged in 15 rows at midbody.

It resembles the Australian venomous rough-scaled snake (Tropidechis carinatus).

T. mairii rarely grows over 1 m (39 in) in total length (tail included).

== Behavior ==
Tropidonophis mairii is diurnal and nocturnal, arboreal, semi-aquatic, and terrestrial.

== Diet ==
Mair's keelback preys mainly on frogs, but also eats small fishes, lizards, and mammals. It is one of the few Australian snakes that can eat cane toads (Rhinella marina), up to a certain size, without being harmed.

== Reproduction ==
T. mairii is oviparous. Clutch size is 3–18 eggs.
