= Tropidonophis aenigmaticus =

Conservation status
- Least Concern (IUCN 3.1)

Scientific classification
- Kingdom: Animalia
- Phylum: Chordata
- Class: Reptilia
- Order: Squamata
- Suborder: Serpentes
- Family: Colubridae
- Genus: Tropidonophis
- Species: T. aenigmaticus

Binomial name
- Tropidonophis aenigmaticus Malnate & Underwood, 1988

Species of snake

Tropidonophis aenigmaticus, also known commonly as the East Papuan keelback, is a species of snake in the subfamily Natricinae of the family Colubridae. The species is native to Papua New Guinea including Fergusson Island.

== Habitat ==
The preferred natural habitats of Tropidonophis aenigmaticus are freshwater wetlands, including near streams in forest, at altitudes from near sea level to 1,700 m (5,600 ft).

== Reproduction ==
Tropidonophis aenigmaticus is oviparous.
