= Tropidonophis doriae =

Conservation status
- Least Concern (IUCN 3.1)

Scientific classification
- Kingdom: Animalia
- Phylum: Chordata
- Class: Reptilia
- Order: Squamata
- Suborder: Serpentes
- Family: Colubridae
- Genus: Tropidonophis
- Species: T. doriae

Binomial name
- Tropidonophis doriae (Boulenger, 1897)

Synonyms
- Tropidonotus doriae Boulenger, 1897; Natrix doriae — Loveridge, 1948; Amphiesma doriae — Malnate, 1960; Tropidonophis doriae — Malnate & Underwood, 1988

Species of snake

Tropidonophis doriae, commonly known as the barred keelback, is a species of snake in the subfamily Natricinae of the family Colubridae. The species is native to New Guinea and some nearby islands.

== Etymology ==
The specific name, doriae, commemorates Italian naturalist Giacomo Doria.

== Geographic range ==
Tropidonophis doriae can be found in the Aru Islands (Maluku province, Indonesia) and in New Guinea (Papua New Guinea and West Papua).

== Habitat ==
The preferred natural habitat of Tropidonophis doriae is forest near streams, at altitudes from sea level to 1,545 m (5,069 ft).

== Diet ==
Tropidonophis doriae preys upon frogs, including their eggs and tadpoles, and on fishes.

== Reproduction ==
Tropidonophis doriae is oviparous. Clutch size is 2–8 eggs.
