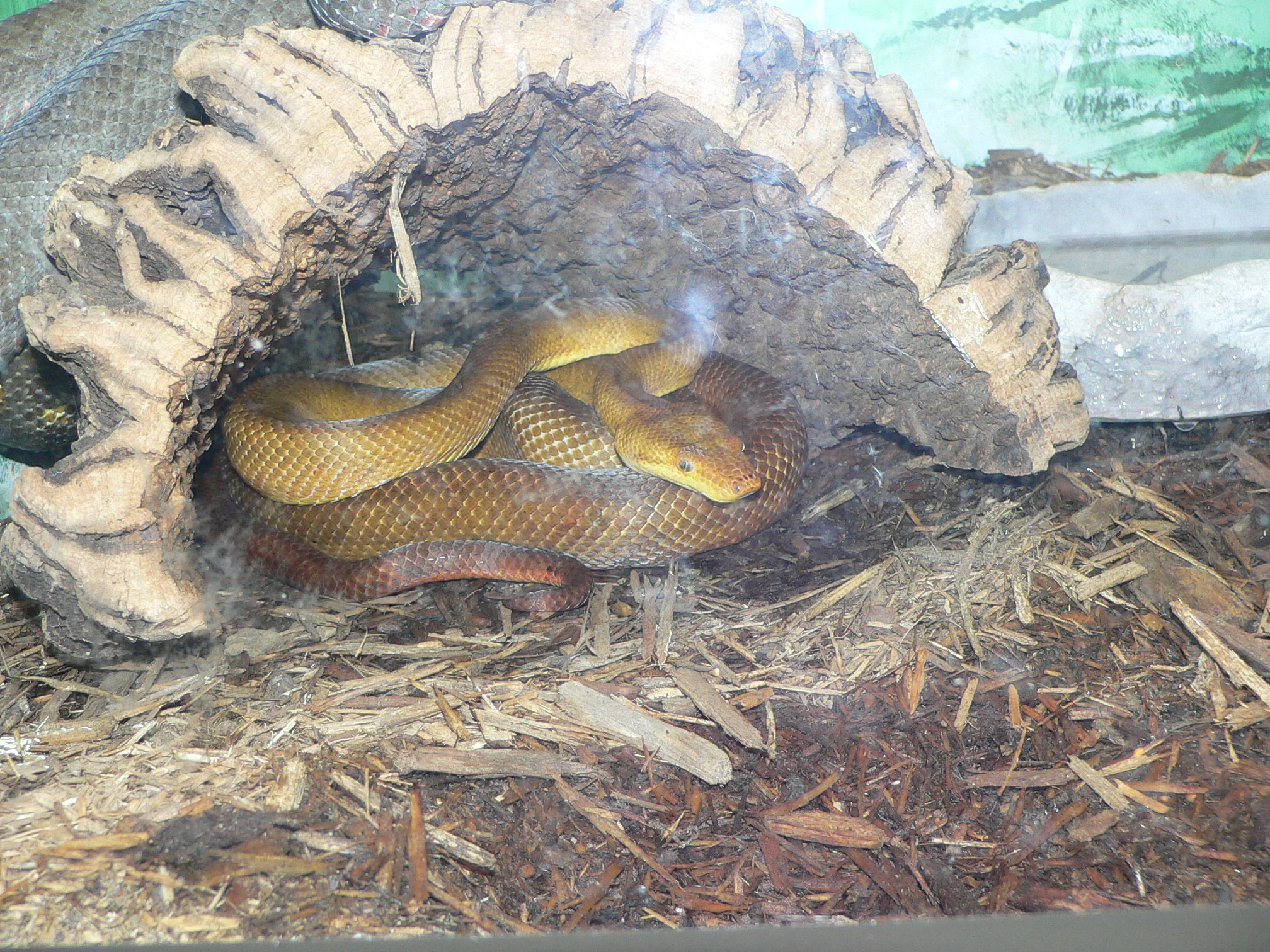

Conservation status
- Least Concern (IUCN 3.1)

Scientific classification
- Kingdom: Animalia
- Phylum: Chordata
- Class: Reptilia
- Order: Squamata
- Suborder: Serpentes
- Family: Boidae
- Genus: Candoia
- Species: C. bibroni

Binomial name
- Candoia bibroni (A.M.C. Duméril & Bibron, 1844)

Synonyms
- Enygrus Bibroni A.M.C. Duméril & Bibron, 1844; Enygrus Bibroni — Jacquinot & Guichenot in Hombron & Jacquinot, 1853; Enygrus Bibronii — Günther, 1858; Enygrus bibronii — Boulenger, 1893; Enygrus bibroni bibroni — Sternfeld, 1920; Candoia bibroni — Frazzetta, 1959; Candoia bibroni bibroni — Stimson, 1969

= Candoia bibroni =

Species of snake

Candoia bibroni – commonly known as Bibron's bevel-nosed boa, Bibron's keel-scaled boa, the Pacific tree boa and the Fiji boa – is a species of snake in the subfamily Candoiinae of the family Boidae. The genus Candoia is a group of non-venomous, constricting snakes, endemic to the southern Pacific Ocean island chains of Melanesia and Polynesia. Two subspecies of Candoia bibroni are recognized, including the nominate subspecies, described here. Candoia bibroni is one of the most isolated and far-removed species of boid snakes on earth, as the majority of boa species (such as Boa constrictor) are found in the Americas and the Caribbean, or, in the case of the terrestrial sand boas (subfamily Erycinae), in Africa and Eurasia.

== Etymology ==
The specific name, bibroni, is in honor of French herpetologist Gabriel Bibron.

== Description ==
Candoia bibroni is the largest member of the genus Candoia; adults can grow to up to 5 ft /1.5 meters in total length (including the tail). The color pattern usually consists of a pale brown, tan, or reddish-brown ground color overlaid with stripes, blotches, or spots. However, some individuals have no pattern at all.

== Geographic range ==
Candoia bibroni is found in the South Pacific, primarily across the islands of Melanesia and Polynesia, including the eastern Solomon Islands (Olu Malau, Ugi, Rennell, Makira, Santa Ana, Santa Cruz, Bellona, Vanikoro and Utupua), the Banks Islands (Vanua Lava), Vanuatu (Efate, Erromango, Espiritu Santo), the Loyalty Islands (Lifou, Ouvéa, Tiga), Fiji—including Kadavu, Rotuma, Ovalau, Taveuni, the Mamanuca (Malolo, Mana), Yasawa and Lau Islands—, Tuvalu, Western Samoa (Savaiʻi and Upolu), and American Samoa (Taʻū).

The type locality given is "l'île Viti" (local name of Fiji Islands archipelago). Jacquinot and Guichenot (1853) list the type locality as "de l'archipel de Viti, Polynésie".

== Habitat ==
The preferred natural habitat of Candoia bibroni is forest, at altitudes from sea level to 1,600 m (5,200 ft).

== Feeding ==
Candoia bibroni is both an arboreal and a terrestrial hunter, preying primarily on birds, lizards (such as the many insular gecko and skink species) and small mammals, including rodents and bats.

== Reproduction ==
Candoia bibroni is viviparous.

== Subspecies ==
Subspecies	Taxon author	Common name	Geographic range
C. b. australis	(Montrouzier, 1860)	Solomon Islands tree boa	Solomon Islands/Tonga Island
C. b. bibroni	(A.M.C. Duméril & Bibron, 1844)	Pacific tree boa	the South Pacific Islands
