= Tropidonophis negrosensis =

Conservation status
- Near Threatened (IUCN 3.1)

Scientific classification
- Kingdom: Animalia
- Phylum: Chordata
- Class: Reptilia
- Order: Squamata
- Suborder: Serpentes
- Family: Colubridae
- Genus: Tropidonophis
- Species: T. negrosensis

Binomial name
- Tropidonophis negrosensis (Taylor, 1917)

Species of snake

Tropidonophis negrosensis, the Negros spotted water snake , is a species of colubrid snake. It is found in the Philippines.
