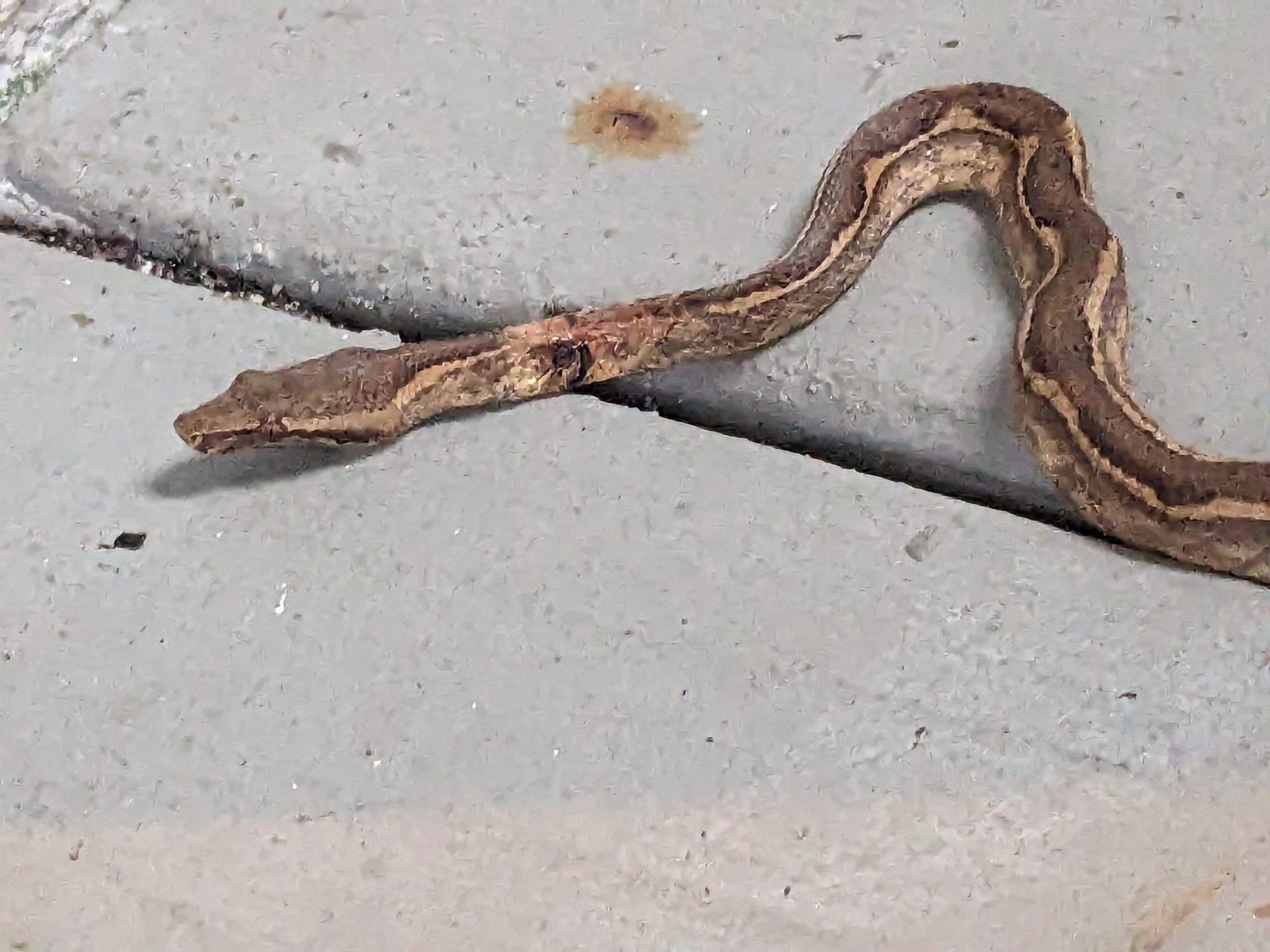

Conservation status
- Least Concern (IUCN 3.1)

Scientific classification
- Kingdom: Animalia
- Phylum: Chordata
- Class: Reptilia
- Order: Squamata
- Suborder: Serpentes
- Family: Boidae
- Genus: Candoia
- Species: C. superciliosa

Binomial name
- Candoia superciliosa (Günther, 1863)

Synonyms
- Enygrus superciliosus Günther, 1863; Enygrus carinatus var. superciliosus Günther, 1863

= Candoia superciliosa =

Species of snake

Candoia superciliosa, known commonly as the Palau bevel-nosed boa and the Belau bevel-nosed boa, is a species of snake in the subfamily Candoiinae of the family Boidae. As its common names suggest, the species is endemic to Palau. Its diet consists of almost exclusively ectotherms. There are two recognized subspecies.

== Habitat ==
The preferred natural habitats of Candoia superciliosa are forest and shrubland, at elevations from near sea level to 200 m (660 ft), but it has also been found in disturbed and artificial habitats.

== Subspecies ==
In addition to the nominate subspecies, there is one other subspecies which is recognized as being valid, Candoia superciliosa crombiei H.M. Smith & Chiszar, 2001, the Ngeaur bevel-nosed boa, from the island of Ngeaur.

== Reproduction ==
The mode of reproduction of Candoia superciliosa has been described as ovoviviparous and as viviparous.

== Etymology ==
The subspecific name, crombiei, is in honor of American herpetologist Ronald I. Crombie, collector of the holotype.
