= Candoia paulsoni =

Conservation status
- Least Concern (IUCN 3.1)

Scientific classification
- Kingdom: Animalia
- Phylum: Chordata
- Class: Reptilia
- Order: Squamata
- Suborder: Serpentes
- Family: Boidae
- Genus: Candoia
- Species: C. paulsoni

Binomial name
- Candoia paulsoni (Stull, 1956)

Synonyms
- Enygrus carinatus paulsoni Stull, 1956

Species of snake

Candoia paulsoni, also known commonly as Paulson's bevel-nosed boa, the Solomon Islands ground boa, and the Solomons ground boa, is a species of snake in the subfamily Candoiinae of the family Boidae. The species is native to the Maluku Islands and Melanesia. Six subspecies are recognized.

== Subspecies ==
Six subspecies are recognized as being valid, including the nominotypical subspecies.

- C. p. paulsoni (Stull, 1956) – the Solomon Islands
- C. p. vindumi H.M. Smith & Chiszar, 2001 – Bougainville Island
- C. p. tasmai H.M. Smith & Tepedelen, 2001 – Halmahera and the Talaud Islands, as well as Sulawesi
- C. p. mcdowelli H.M. Smith & Chiszar, 2001 – eastern Papua New Guinea
- C. p. sadlieri H.M. Smith & Chiszar, 2001 – Woodlark Island
- C. p. rosadoi H.M. Smith & Chiszar, 2001 – Misima Island

== Geographic distribution ==
Candoia paulsoni is found in Indonesia, Papua New Guinea, and the Solomon Islands. The type locality is Ugi Island in the Solomon Islands.

== Behavior ==
Candoia paulsoni is both terrestrial and arboreal, and it is mainly nocturnal. Young snakes feed on skinks, while larger individuals eat larger lizards and small mammals. This snake has been found deep within limestone caves where it may have been eating small bats and/or juvenile frogs of the genus Cornufer.

== Reproduction ==
Candoia paulsoni is viviparous. Litter size can be as many as 20 young.

== Etymology ==
The specific name paulsoni is in honor of Swedish herpetologist John Paulson.

The subspecific name, mcdowelli, is in honor of American herpetologist Samuel Booker McDowell Jr.

The subspecific name, rosadoi, is in honor of herpetologist José P. O. Rosado of the Museum of Comparative Zoology.

The subspecific name, sadlieri, is in honor of Australian herpetologist Ross Allen Sadlier.

The subspecific name, tasmai, is in honor of Indonesian reptile breeder Budiyanto Tasma.

The subspecific name, vindumi, is in honor of American herpetologist Jens Verner Vindum.
