= Antaresia papuensis =

Scientific classification
- Kingdom: Animalia
- Phylum: Chordata
- Class: Reptilia
- Order: Squamata
- Suborder: Serpentes
- Family: Pythonidae
- Genus: Antaresia
- Species: A. papuensis

Binomial name
- Antaresia papuensis Antaresia papuensis Esquerré, Donnellan, Pavón-Vázquez, Fenker & Keogh, 2021

Species of snake

Antaresia papuensis, the Papuan spotted python, is a species of small python native to Indonesia, Papua New Guinea and Australia. It can grow to lengths of up to 108 cm (43 in), with a maximum tail length of 9.5 cm (3.7 in). It forms a light stripe in the latter third of its body where there is insufficient space between patches or spots. It has smaller, widely dispersed spots as opposed to large, black patches like A. m. maculosa. Additionally, it rarely possesses prefrontal scales numbering two or three. Large aligned shields make up its head scales, and it has one substantial frontal scale, more or less hexagonal in shape. It also has a pair of internal scales. Around 10 to 12 supralabials are present as well as 10–14 infralabials. There are noticeable heat pits in four infralabial regions and 3-5 loreal scales of varying sizes are present. Smooth, rhombus shaped, and barely overlapping are the distinguishing characteristics of the dorsal scales.
