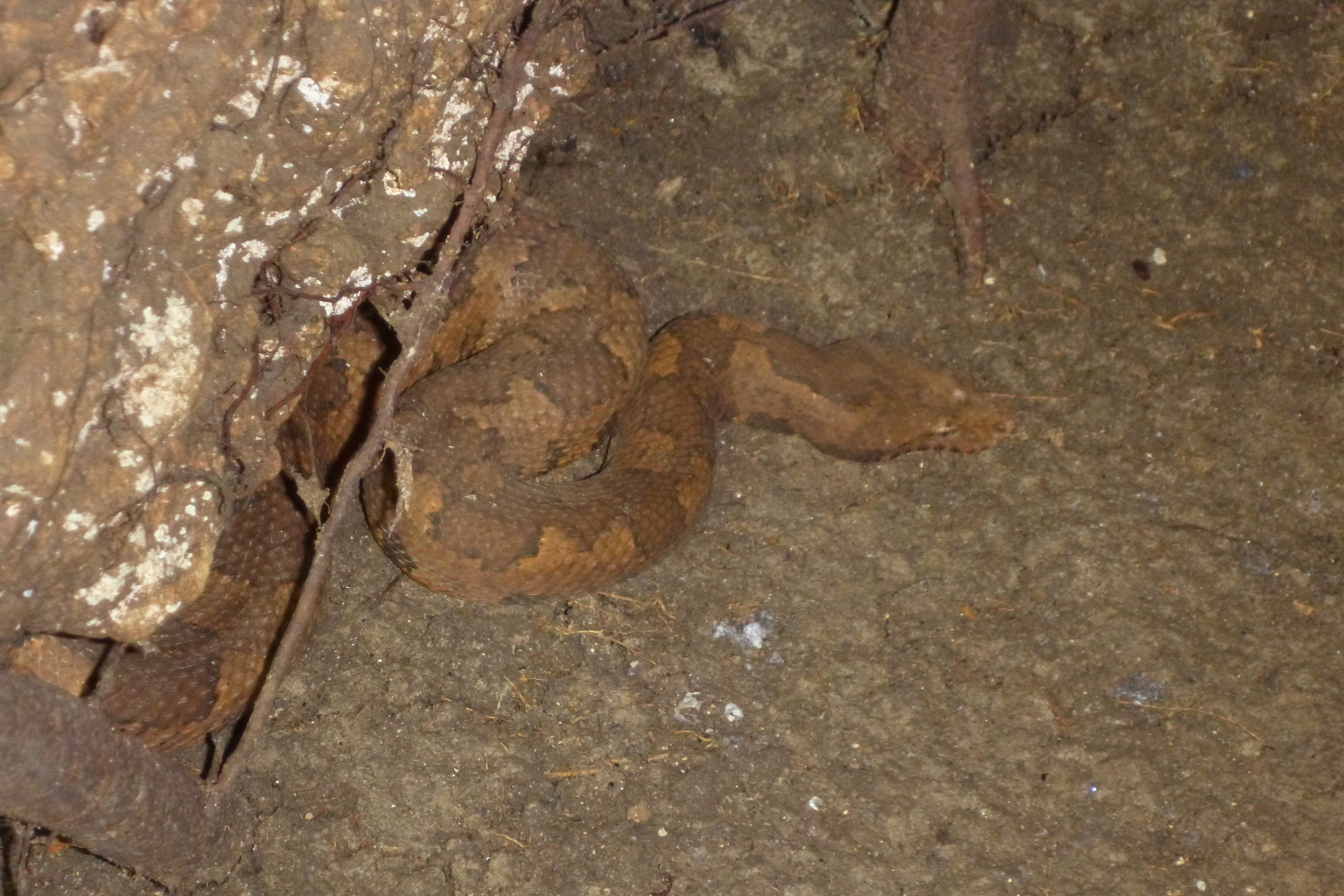

Conservation status
- Least Concern (IUCN 3.1)

Scientific classification
- Kingdom: Animalia
- Phylum: Chordata
- Class: Reptilia
- Order: Squamata
- Suborder: Serpentes
- Family: Boidae
- Genus: Candoia
- Species: C. aspera

Binomial name
- Candoia aspera (Günther, 1877)

= Candoia aspera =

Species of snake

Candoia aspera, known commonly as the Papuan ground boa, New Guinea ground boa, or viper boa, is a species of snake in the family Boidae. As its common name suggests, it is found in New Guinea (in the Papua province of Indonesia and in Papua New Guinea). It is a terrestrial species, living in the undergrowth. It is smaller than some other members of the Boidae family. The Papuan ground boa grows to 2 to 3 feet (0.61 to 0.91 m) in length. It is known to be primarily nocturnal. The Papuan ground boa is known to be slightly more defensive than other Candoia species. In recent years, it has become increasingly scarce in the pet industry due to restrictions on import/export trading. Though it was more common in the past, there is still very little known about it, in particular its behaviour in the wild; for example, its lifespan is still undetermined. It got the nickname viper boa from its appearance. It looks extremely similar to the elapid species Acanthophis laevis, more commonly known as the "Papuan death adder." The Papuan death adder itself only resembles a viper, but is actually an elapid. However, because of the resemblance to the highly venomous Papuan death adder, many Papuan ground boas are killed out of fear, although the latter is harmless.
