= Archives of Environmental Contamination and Toxicology =

- Discipline: Environmental toxicology
- Language: English
- Edited by: Christopher D. Metcalfe

Publication details
- History: 1973-present
- Publisher: Springer Science+Business Media
- Frequency: Quarterly
- Impact factor: 2.804 (2020)

Standard abbreviations
- ISO 4: Arch. Environ. Contam. Toxicol.

Indexing
- ISSN: 0090-4341 (print); 1432-0703 (web)
- OCLC no.: 1787012

Links
- Journal homepage; Online access

Archives of Environmental Contamination and Toxicology is a quarterly peer-reviewed scientific journal published by Springer Science+Business Media, covering environmental health and the effects of contaminants on the environment. It was established in 1973 and the editor-in-chief is Daniel R. Doerge (National Center for Toxicological Research). According to the Journal Citation Reports, the journal has a 2020 impact factor of 2.804.
