= Olive Griffith Stull =

American herpetologist

Olive Griffith Stull (Davis) (February 10, 1905 – June 15, 1969) was an American herpetologist, best known for her work on snakes.

Stull was born in Rochester, New York. She married Loy Davis in 1930, one year after completing her degree at the University of Michigan. In a review of her revision in Copeia, Klauber was critical of her indiscriminate acceptance of reported localities of specimens in the genus.

== Career and scientific contributions ==
Stull worked in the field of veterinary medicine and contributed to research in a variety of fields. Her appointments included fellowships at Harvard's Museum of Comparative Zoology and at her alma mater, where she was a student of Alexander Grant Ruthven. She published an important revision of the colubrid snake genus Pituophis and conducted research in a variety of other areas, most notably into the taxonomy, physiology and distribution of snakes. She was later employed as an agent of the USDA to investigate the diseases of poultry and avian leukosis.

Stull discovered and described a number of new species and subspecies of snakes, including the following:

- Antaresia perthensis (STULL 1932)
- Candoia aspera schmidti (STULL 1932)
- Candoia paulsoni (STULL 1956)
- Chilabothrus granti (STULL 1933)
- Eryx colubrinus loveridgei STULL 1932
- Liasis mackloti dunni STULL 1932
- Pituophis ruthveni STULL 1929
- Python brongersmai STULL 1938
- Simalia kinghorni (STULL 1933)
- Tropidophis jamaicensis STULL 1928
- Tropidophis wrighti STULL 1928

In recognition of her work, one species of snake, Tropidophis stullae GRANT 1940, is named in her honour.
