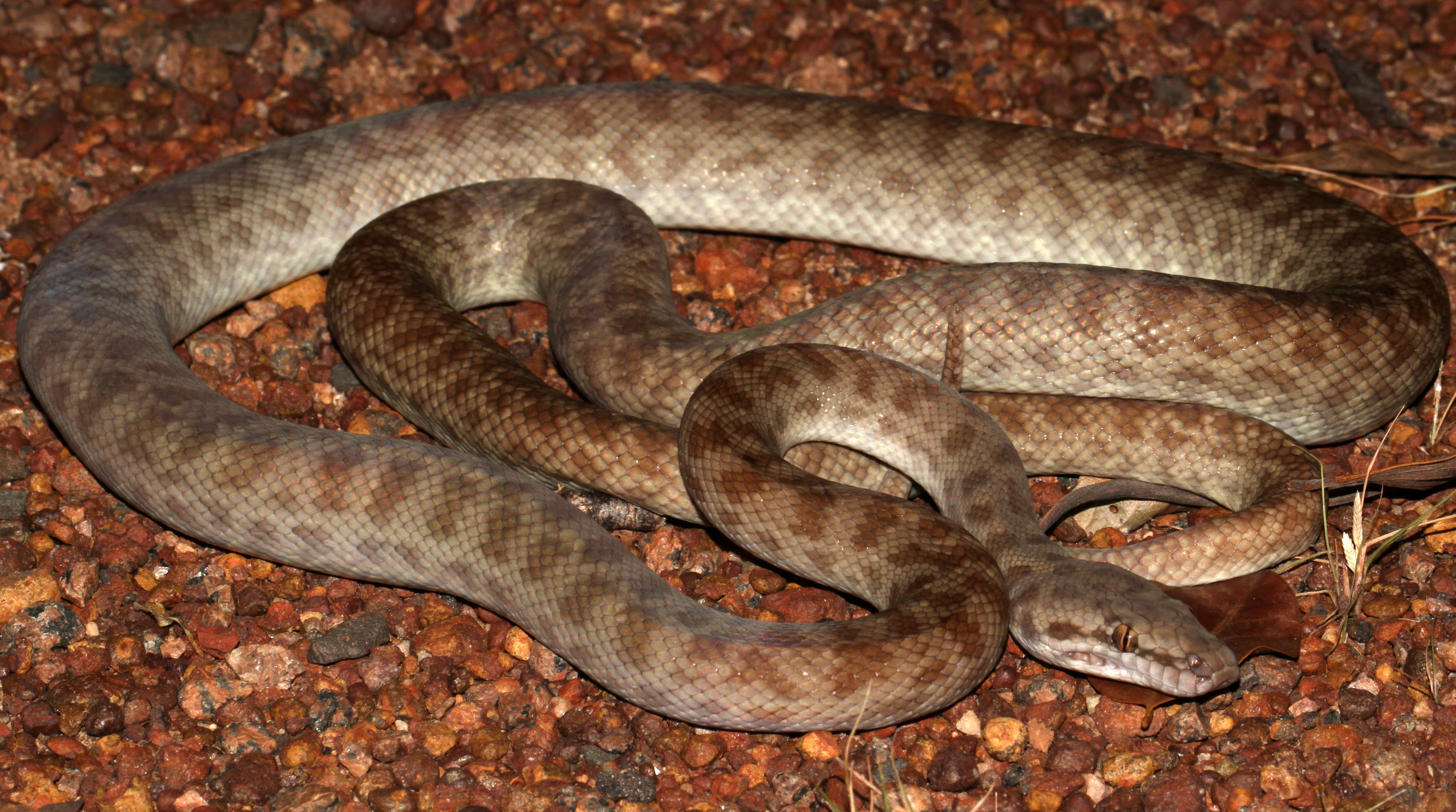
- Children's python

Conservation status
- Least Concern (IUCN 3.1)

Scientific classification
- Kingdom: Animalia
- Phylum: Chordata
- Class: Reptilia
- Order: Squamata
- Suborder: Serpentes
- Family: Pythonidae
- Genus: Antaresia
- Species: A. childreni

Binomial name
- Antaresia childreni (Gray, 1842)

Synonyms
- Liasis childreni Gray, 1842; Liasis gilbertii Gray, 1842; Liasis maculosus W. Peters, 1873; Liasis childreni — Boulenger, 1893; Antaresia childreni — Kluge, 1993

= Children's python =

Antaresia childreni

Species of reptile

Children's python (Antaresia childreni) is a species of nonvenomous snake in the family Pythonidae. The species is named after John George Children. It is a nocturnal species occurring in the northern half of Australia and generally found on the ground, although it often climbs trees. Usually growing to about 1.0 m (3 ft) in length or more depending on the polymorphic variant, it is typically a reddish-brown colour, darker on the upper surface, and with many darker blotches, especially on younger specimens. The Stimson's python variant has much stronger and more variable colours; often being adorned with reddish-brown to chocolate blotches against lighter tan. It feeds mostly on small mammals and birds, and as with other pythons, it constricts its prey before swallowing it whole. It is a popular pet among reptile enthusiasts.

== Taxonomy and naming ==
Antaresia childreni is one of four species in the genus Antaresia, a genus in the family Pythonidae. The genus is named after the star Antares. John Edward Gray published the original description of the species in 1842, naming it Liasis childreni. Both the common name and the specific epithet, childreni, are in honour of Gray's mentor, John George Children, a curator of the zoological collection at the British Museum around that time. As of 2020 no subspecies are recognised as being valid. Some species of the genus Antaresia were formerly assigned to the genus Morelia. Studies published in 2020 on the members of the genus Antaresia concluded that Stimson's and Children's pythons are synonymous species with different polymorphism. As a result, Stimson's python is now considered a polymorphic variant of Children's python.

Children's python is known by other common names such as banded rock python, small-blotched python, and eastern small-blotched python.

== Description ==
Adults of A. childreni grow to a total length (including tail) around 1–1.5 m (3–5 ft) depending on locality and polymorphic variant. The scales on the top of the head are enlarged, while those on the upper surface of the body are small and smooth, with a rainbow sheen that can be seen when exposed to direct sunlight. The upper surface of the snake is brown with darker spots in five or six longitudinal series in the type variant. A dark streak on each side of the head passes across the eye. The lips are yellowish, spotted with brown. The lower surface of the snake is uniformly yellowish. The head of the snake is distinct from the neck. The nostril is superolateral, pierced in a large semidivided nasal scale. The eye is moderate in size, with a vertical pupil. The body is slightly laterally compressed. The tail is short. About 41 to 45 rows of dorsal scales cross the snake's back, and 257 to 287 ventral scales are seen along the lower surface. A single undivided anal scale is found immediately in front of the anus, and 38 to 53 subcaudal scales are on the lower surface between the anus and the tip of the tail, all or mostly in two rows. The polymorphic variant known as the Stimson's python has much stronger and more variable colours; often being adorned with reddish-brown to chocolate blotches against lighter tan.

The rostral is broader than high, barely visible from above. The internasals are slightly longer than broad and are shorter than the anterior prefrontals. The second pair of prefrontals is in contact at the midline, or is separated by a small shield. These posterior prefrontals are sometimes broken into several shields. The frontal is one and a half times as long as broad, slightly shorter than its distance from the end of the snout, longer than the small parietals. Three to 10 small loreal shields are present, some almost granular, with 11 to 13 upper labials. Three or four of the posterior lower labials have deep pits. The anterior maxillary teeth and anterior mandibular teeth are very long, gradually decreasing in size posteriorly. The premaxillary bone also has teeth.

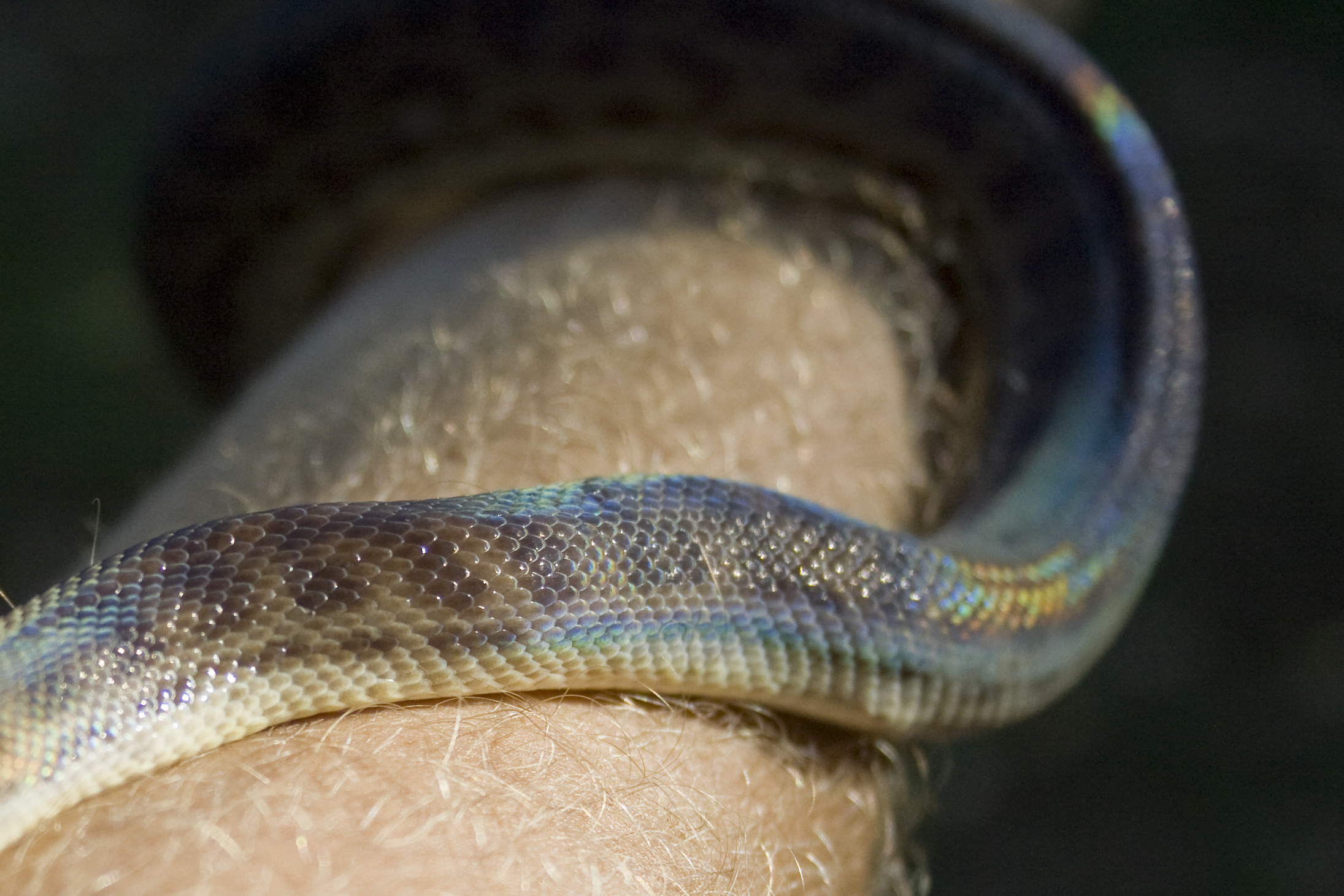
A. childreni: rainbow sheen

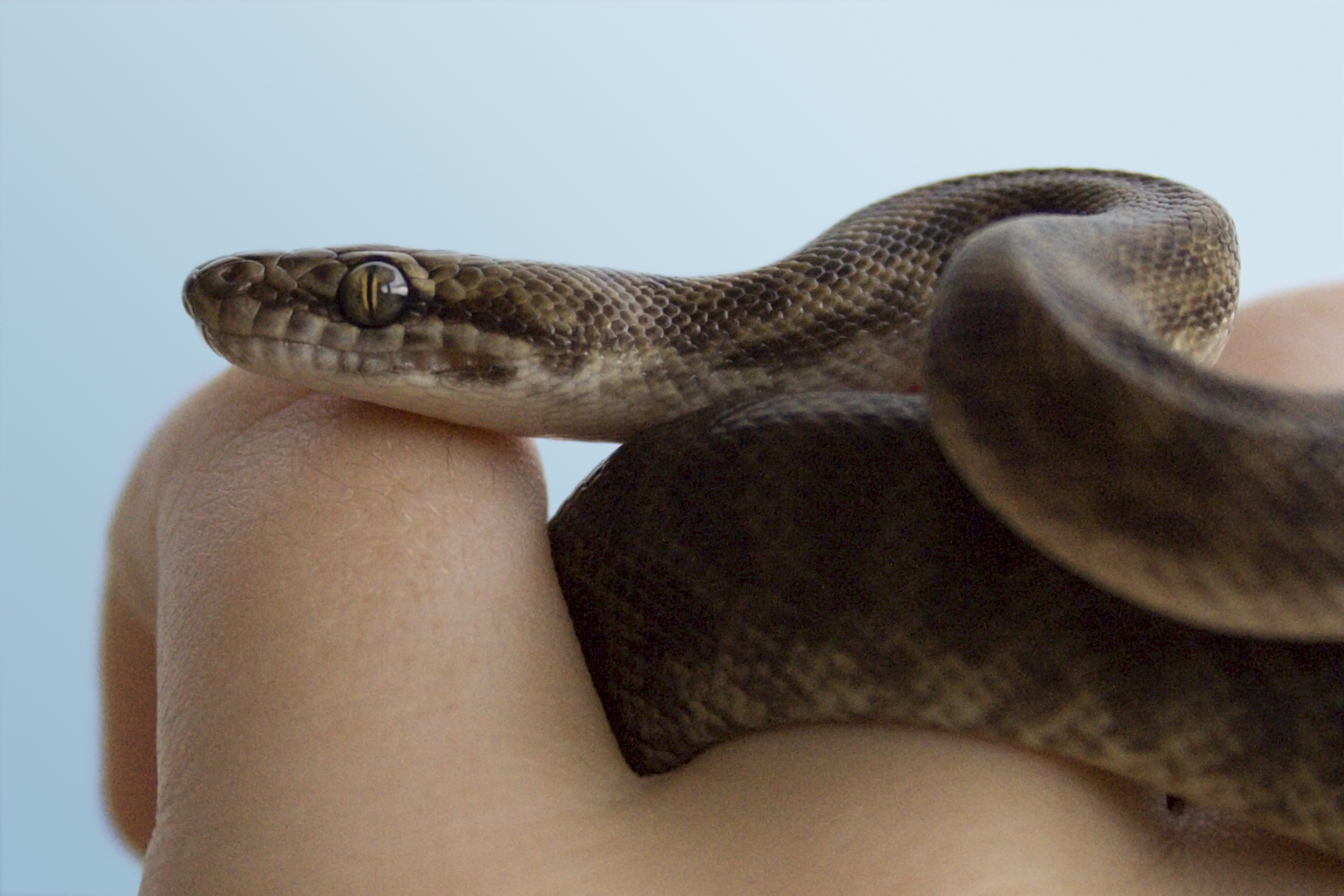
A. childreni, young male

== Geographic range ==
A. childreni is found in Australia in the extreme north of Western Australia, the northern third of the Northern Territory, and northern Queensland, and also on the islands of the Torres Strait. The Stimson's python variant is found throughout an even greater range; it occupies much of the interior of Australia, from Queensland to Perth.

The type locality is given by Gray (1842) as "—?", is listed as "N.W. Australia" by Boulenger (1893) in his Catalogue of the Snakes in the British Museum (Natural History). Volume I., and is listed as "unknown" in Stimson (1969).

A. childreni occurs specifically in the region spanning the coast between the Kimberleys in Western Australia to Mount Isa in northwestern Queensland.

== Habitat ==
Children's python is found in a variety of natural habitats, including forest, savanna, shrubland, desert, grassland, and freshwater wetlands. In Alice Springs the cosmopolitan tick Amblyomma limbatum has been collected from a Children's python.

The peak activity period for the Children's python, as determined from callouts by members of the public to professional snake catchers, in the Darwin region is during the later part of the wet season (February–April). During this period the species is significantly more likely to be encountered in and around open grassland and plains habitats than during other months of the year.

== Diet ==
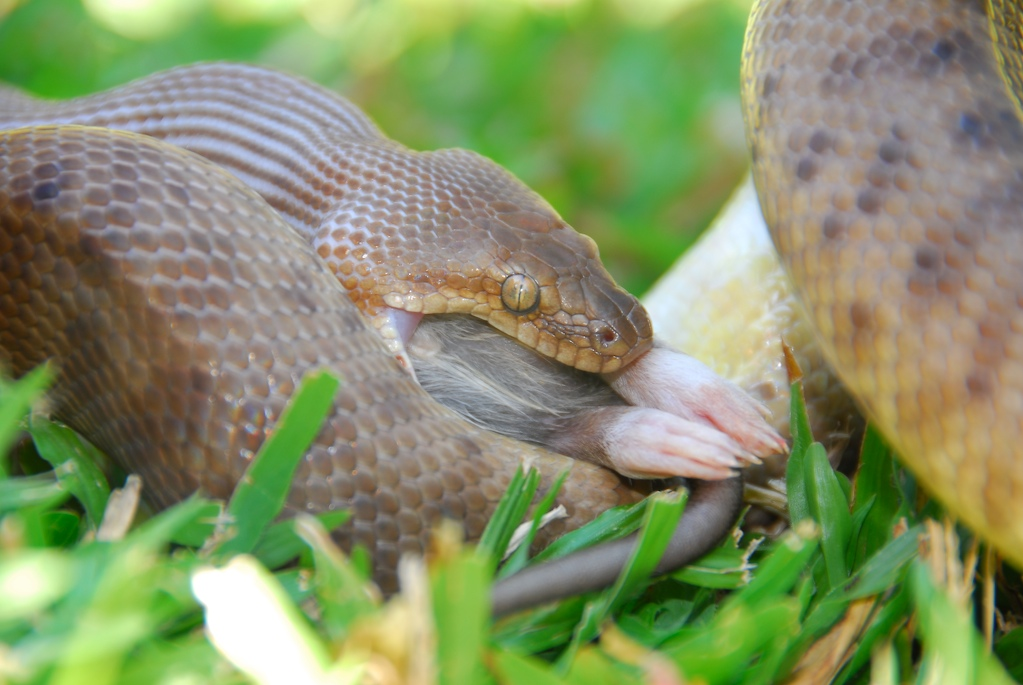
Feeding on a rodent

The diet of Children's python consists of reptiles, birds, and small mammals, particularly microbats, which it catches by dangling from stalactites in caves, which they commonly inhabit, and snatching them out of the air as they fly past.

== Reproduction ==
A. childreni is oviparous, with up to 25 eggs per clutch. Females brood their eggs through a seven-week incubation period by coiling around them and occasionally shivering to keep them warm, which also affords the eggs some protection from predators. Juveniles are heavily blotched, but gradually become reddish-brown or brown as they mature. The Stimson's variant often becomes more starkly contrasted by comparison as it matures depending on locality. Males in captivity have been seen to fight over females, suggesting these snakes will fight for mates in the wild. However, combat in wild individuals of this species has never been witnessed. When the males fight, they use their spurs to scratch their opponents, and will also strike and bite one another until one submits.

== Captivity ==
Children's python is often kept as a pet worldwide due to its small size, docile temperament, strong feeding response, resiliency and easy captive care. It is often seen as a good beginner species for keeping reptiles, particularly snakes. High levels of hygiene will reduce the risk of disease transfer to pet owners. While not as popular or diverse in colours as ball pythons or other larger species, A. childreni can range in colour from albino and leucistic to ebony, melanistic, ghost, and piebald colour morphs to name a few. The varying colouration between individuals also makes it quite attractive to many who work with and breed exotic reptiles. In captivity, the members of this genus are very tolerant of differing humidity levels ranging from 20%-80% due to the wide range of habitats they occur in, and shedding problems that occur in captive animals are usually the result of temperatures being too high or low rather than problems with humidity. Antaresia species are also fairly easy to breed, though some individuals (mostly males) may refuse to eat when they are interested in mating. The lifespan of captive specimens has been known to exceed 30 years. Juveniles are fed baby, hairless mice, while larger individuals can be fed on adult mice or small rats. Feeding should occur roughly once a fortnight.

A Children's python consuming and regurgitating another snake
