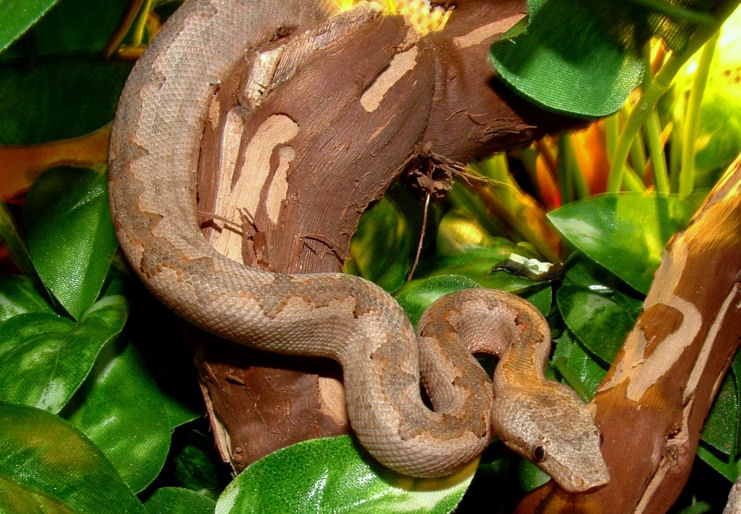
- Pacific ground boa (Candoia carinata)

Scientific classification
- Kingdom: Animalia
- Phylum: Chordata
- Class: Reptilia
- Order: Squamata
- Suborder: Serpentes
- Family: Boidae
- Subfamily: Candoiinae
- Genus: Candoia; Gray, 1842

Synonyms
- Cenchris Gray, 1831; Cenchrus Swainson, 1839; Candoia Gray, 1842; Tropidoboa Hombron & Jacquinot in Jacquinot & Guichenot, 1842; Enygrus A.M.C. Duméril & Bibron, 1844; Erebophis Günther, 1877; Candoia — Forcart, 1951

= Candoia =

Genus of snakes

Candoia is a genus of non-venomous snakes in the subfamily Candoiinae of the family Boidae. Species of Candoia are found mostly in New Guinea, Melanesia, the Solomon Islands, and the Maluku Islands in Indonesia. Common names include bevel-nosed boas and keel-scaled boas. There are five recognized species.

== Description ==
The species of the genus Candoia typically have a rounded and heavy body, with a flattened triangular-shaped head and an upturned nose. Colors and patterns vary greatly, but most are various shades of brown to black. Species can vary in adult size from 60 cm (24 in) to 1.8 m (5.9 ft) in total length (tail included). Males are typically smaller than females and can be distinguished by their prominent cloacal spurs.

== Distribution and habitat ==
The species of the genus Candoia are found from Samoa and Tokelau west through Melanesia to New Guinea and the Maluku Islands and the Solomon Islands in Indonesia.

== Behavior ==
All species of Candoia are primarily nocturnal.

== Feeding ==
The primary diet of Candoia species consists of frogs, tadpoles, fish, skinks and other lizards, rodents and birds. Neonates are more inclined to feed on tadpoles, fish and lizard species, with adult specimens of C. aspera, C. p. paulsoni and C. p. tasmai transitioning to larger prey which includes rodents and birds. C. carinata and C. bibroni australis remain focused on lizard, skink and bird prey.

== Reproduction ==
In the species of the genus Candoia, breeding occurs early in the year, typically after rains. Several males will approach and pursue a single female, and mild combat can be observed between the males where they will buck each other off of the desired female. Females seem to only ovulate once every two or three years and give birth to litters averaging 10 or so neonates. The Solomon Island ground boa (C. paulsoni) is an exception, as it is known to have particularly large litters, with the average being 30–40 but as many as 110 on record in captive reproduction.

== Captivity ==
The species of the genus Candoia are frequently imported for the exotic pet trade, but are now being bred in captivity with some regularity by private individuals. Their small size and ease of care make them interesting captives, but wild-caught specimens are not known to acclimate well. The stress of captivity manifests itself in the form of lack of interest in food. Their natural diet often presents a problem for hobbyists mainly familiar with using rodents as food.

== Species ==
Five species are recognized as being valid.

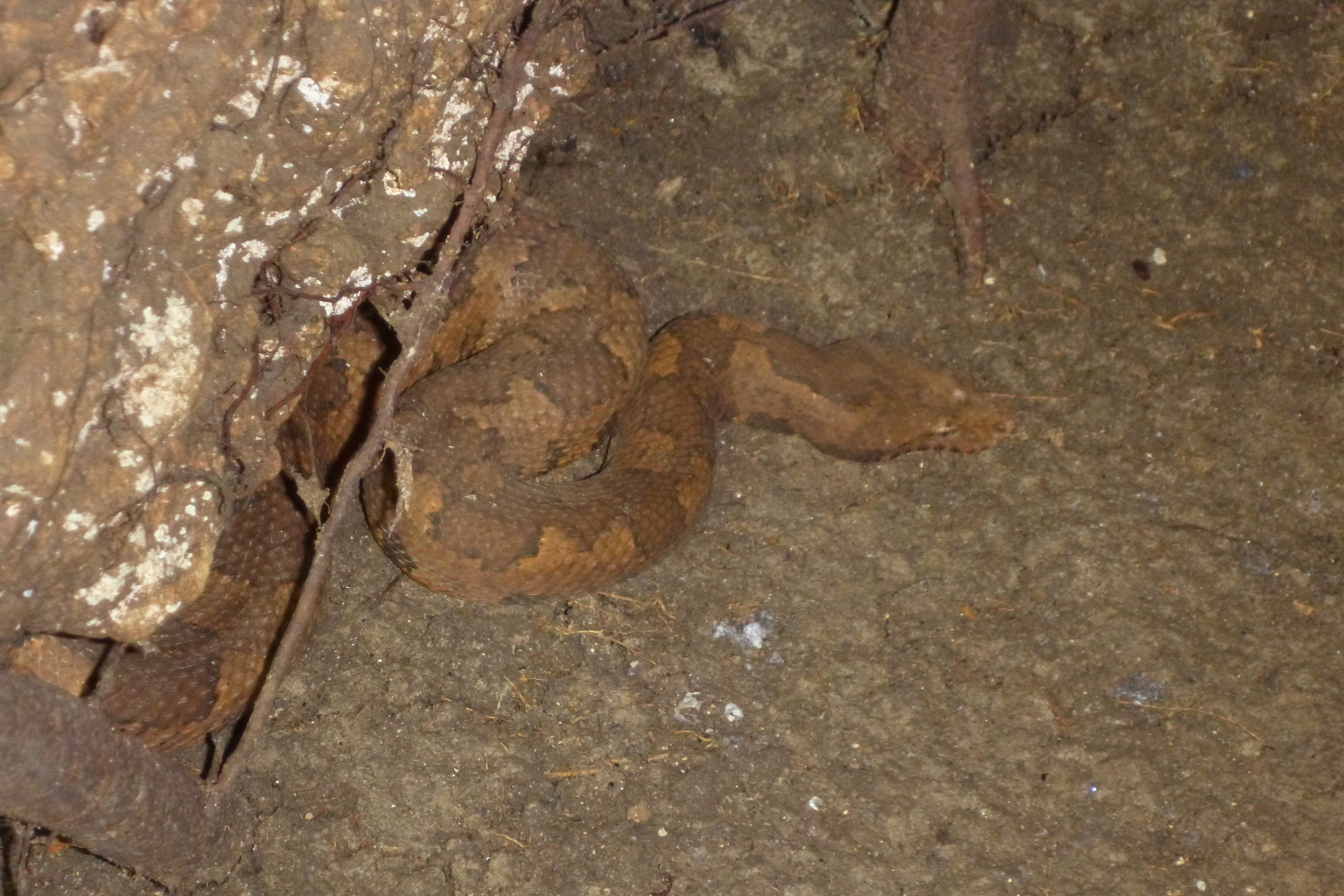
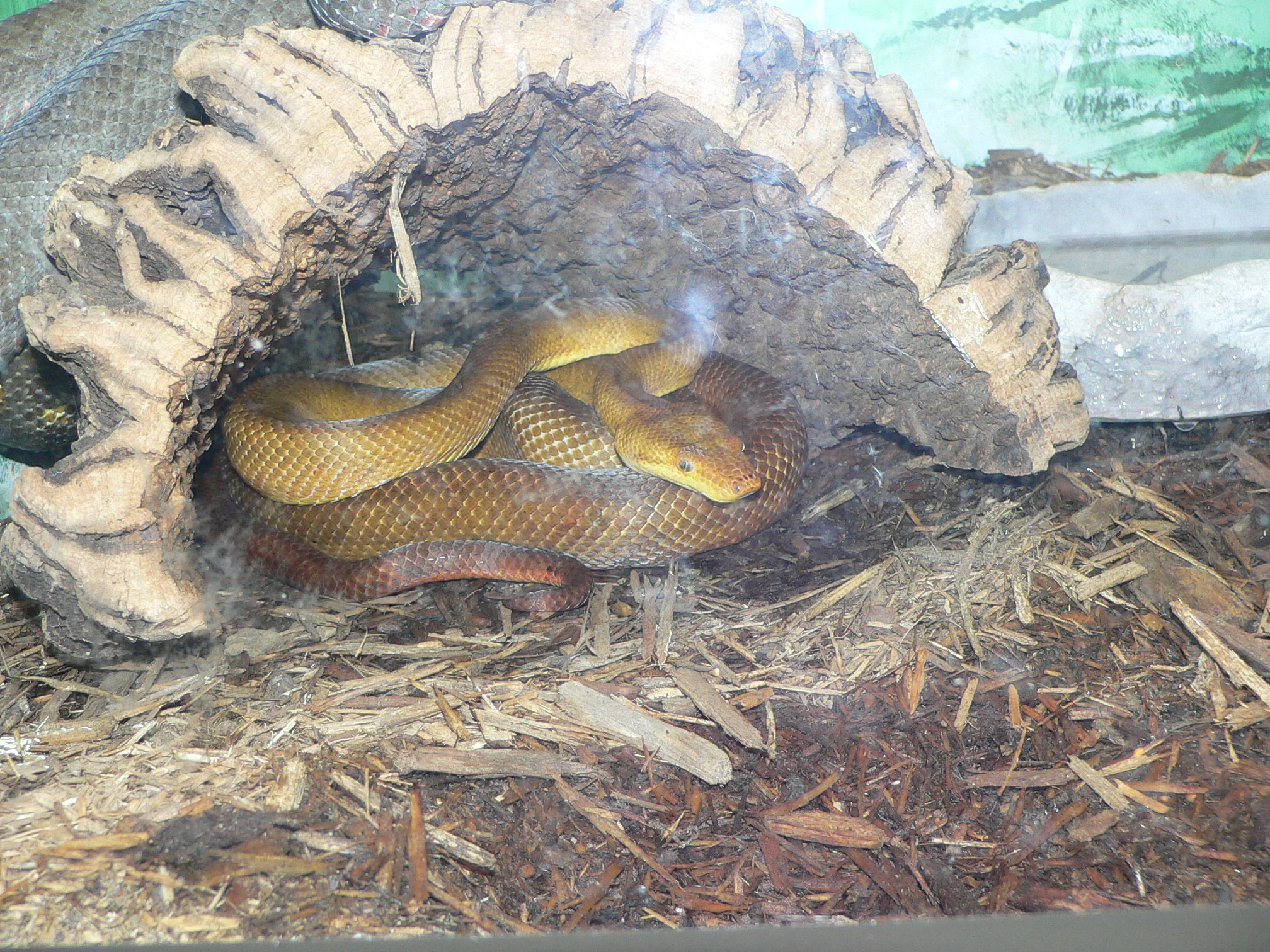
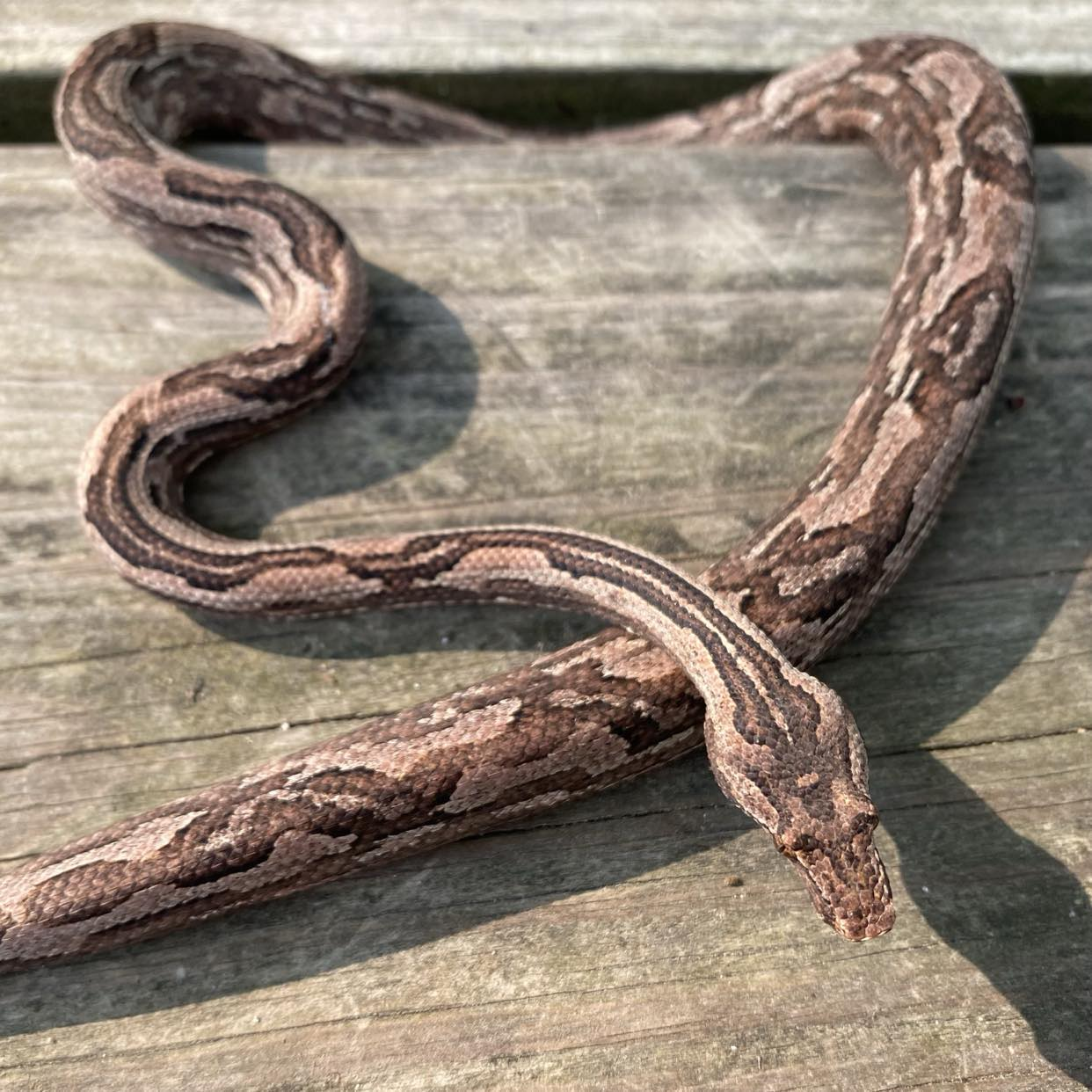
Species	Taxon author	Subspecies*	Common name	Geographic range
Candoia aspera	(Günther, 1877)	0	Papuan ground boa, New Guinea ground boa, viper boa	New Guinea (Irian Jaya and Papua New Guinea below 1,300 m), including the nearby islands of Waigeu, Batanta, Misool and Salawati, the islands of Biak and Yapen in Geelvink Bay, Seleo, Valise, Karkar, Umboi, Manus, Los Negros, Lou, Baluan, the Rambatyo Islands in the Manus Group (the Admiralty Islands), New Britain, Duke of York, New Ireland and New Hanover in the Bismarck Archipelago.
Candoia bibroni	(A.M.C. Duméril & Bibron, 1844)	1	Bibron's bevel-nosed boa, Bibron's keel-scaled boa, Pacific tree boa, Fiji boa	Melanesia and Polynesia, including the eastern Solomon Islands (Olu Malau, the Reef Islands, Rennell Island, San Critobal, Santa Ana Island, the Santa Cruz Islands, Bio, Bellona Island, Three Sisters, Ugi Island and the Vanikolo Islands), the Banks Islands (Vanua Lava Island), the New Hebrides, all three of the Loyalty Islands, the Fiji Islands (Rotuma, the Yasawa Group and the Lau Group), Western Samoa (Savai'i and Upolu) and American Samoa (Taʻū).
Candoia carinata	(Schneider, 1801)	1	Pacific ground boa, Pacific keel-scaled boa, Indonesian tree boa	Indonesia, including the northern peninsula of Sulawesi, the Sangihe and Telaud Islands, the northern Maluku Islands (Seram, Ambon, Haruku, Saparua, the Banda Islands, Goram and the Tanimbar Islands), Misool, Batanta, Salawatti, Anaguar (Saipan) and the Palau Group (at least on Koror Island). New Guinea: the islands of Geelvink Bay and those along the northern coast, including Liki, Djamna, Karkar and the Umboi Islands. Manus and nearby islands. The Bismarck Archipelago, including the islands of Mussau and Tench. The islands of Milne Bay Province, at least on Samarai, Kiriwina, Kitava, Goodenough, Fergusson, Dobu, Normanby, Slade, Misima, Woodlark, Sudest and Rossel. The islands of Buka, Bougainville Island and those nearby. The Solomon Islands, including Santa Cruz, Rennell and Bellona.
Candoia paulsoni	(Stull, 1956)	4	Solomon Islands ground boa	C. Paulsoni is mainly found and contained to The Solomon Islands.
Candoia superciliosa	(Günther, 1863)	1	Palau bevel-nosed boa, Belau bevel-nosed boa	Palau

- ) Not including the nominate subspecies.
  ^{T}') Type species.

== Classification ==
The genus Candoia is traditionally placed in the subfamily Boinae; however, a 2013 study comparing DNA sequences of 12 genes of over 4,000 species supported Candoia as more distantly related, with remaining members of the Boinae being more closely related to the boid subfamily Erycinae; thus Candoia was placed in the newly named subfamily Candoiinae.
