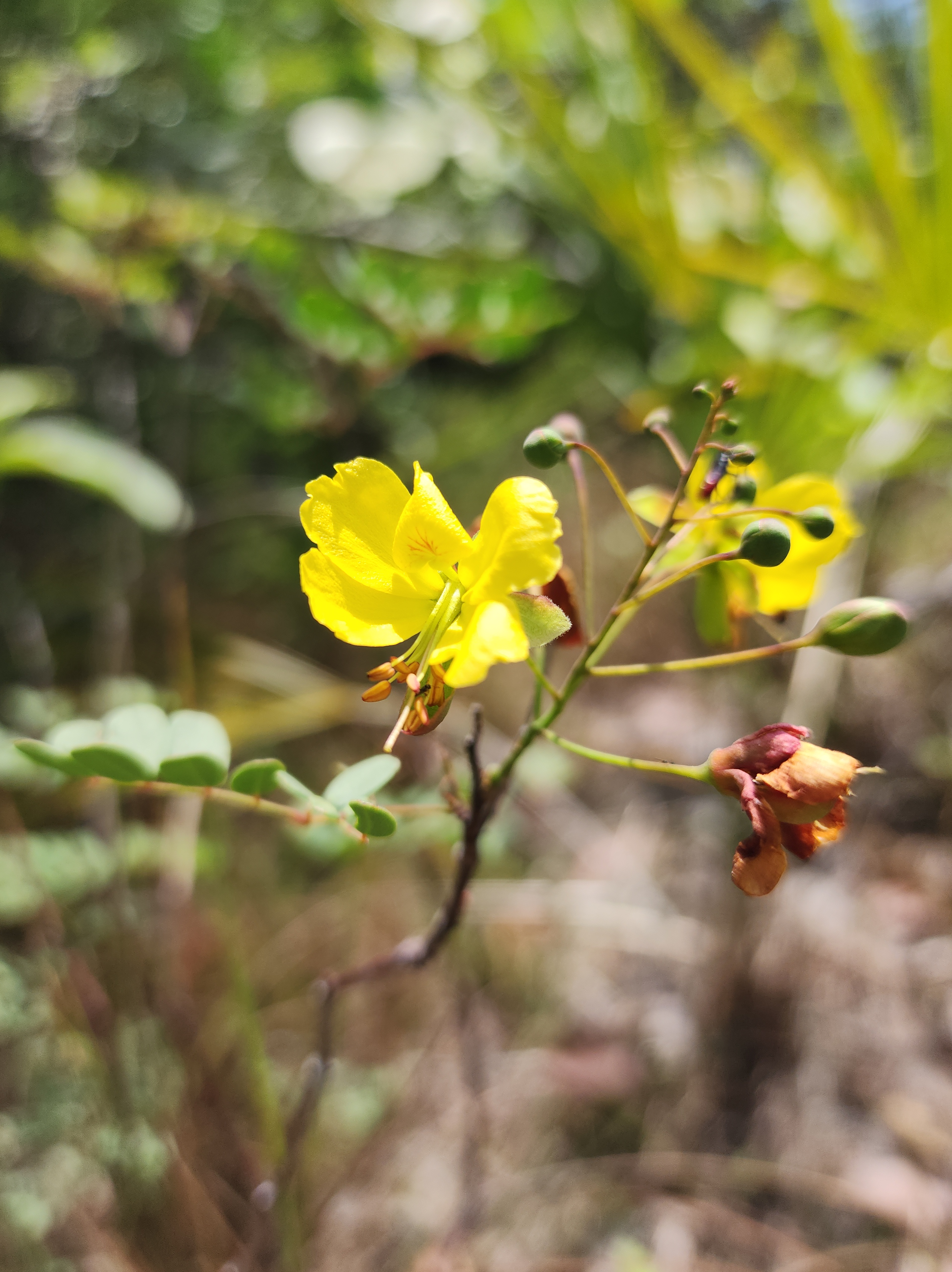
- Blooming in open-canopy pine rockland habitat on Big Pine Key, FL

Conservation status
- Vulnerable (NatureServe)

Scientific classification
- Kingdom: Plantae
- Clade: Tracheophytes
- Clade: Angiosperms
- Clade: Eudicots
- Clade: Rosids
- Order: Fabales
- Family: Fabaceae
- Subfamily: Caesalpinioideae
- Genus: Denisophytum
- Species: D. pauciflorum

Binomial name
- Denisophytum pauciflorum Grisebach

Synonyms
- List: Libidibia pauciflora (Griseb.); Caesalpinia pauciflora (Griseb.)C.Wright; Poinciana paucifloria (Griseb.)Small

= Denisophytum pauciflorum =

Species of flowering plant

Denisophytum pauciflorum, commonly referred to as fewflower holdback, is a rare species of legume in the peacock flower subfamily (Caesalpinioideae). It is known to grow natively in Cuba and scattered sites in extreme south Florida in the Lower Florida Keys. However, there are some sources reporting it elsewhere in the West Indies, such as Hispaniola.

== Habitat ==
In Florida, it is only known to occur in pine rockland and rockland hammocks on Big Pine Key and Cudjoe Key.

== Conservation ==
The species is reportedly somewhat widespread and abundant outside of Florida, although this needs further verification. However, in Florida it is regarded by NatureServe as critically endangered and is a state-listed endangered species. Here, it is threatened by habitat loss due to its already restricted range. Many occurrences are believed to exist on private land, although it has some protection inside the National Key Deer Refuge.

== Gallery ==
Beginning to fruit

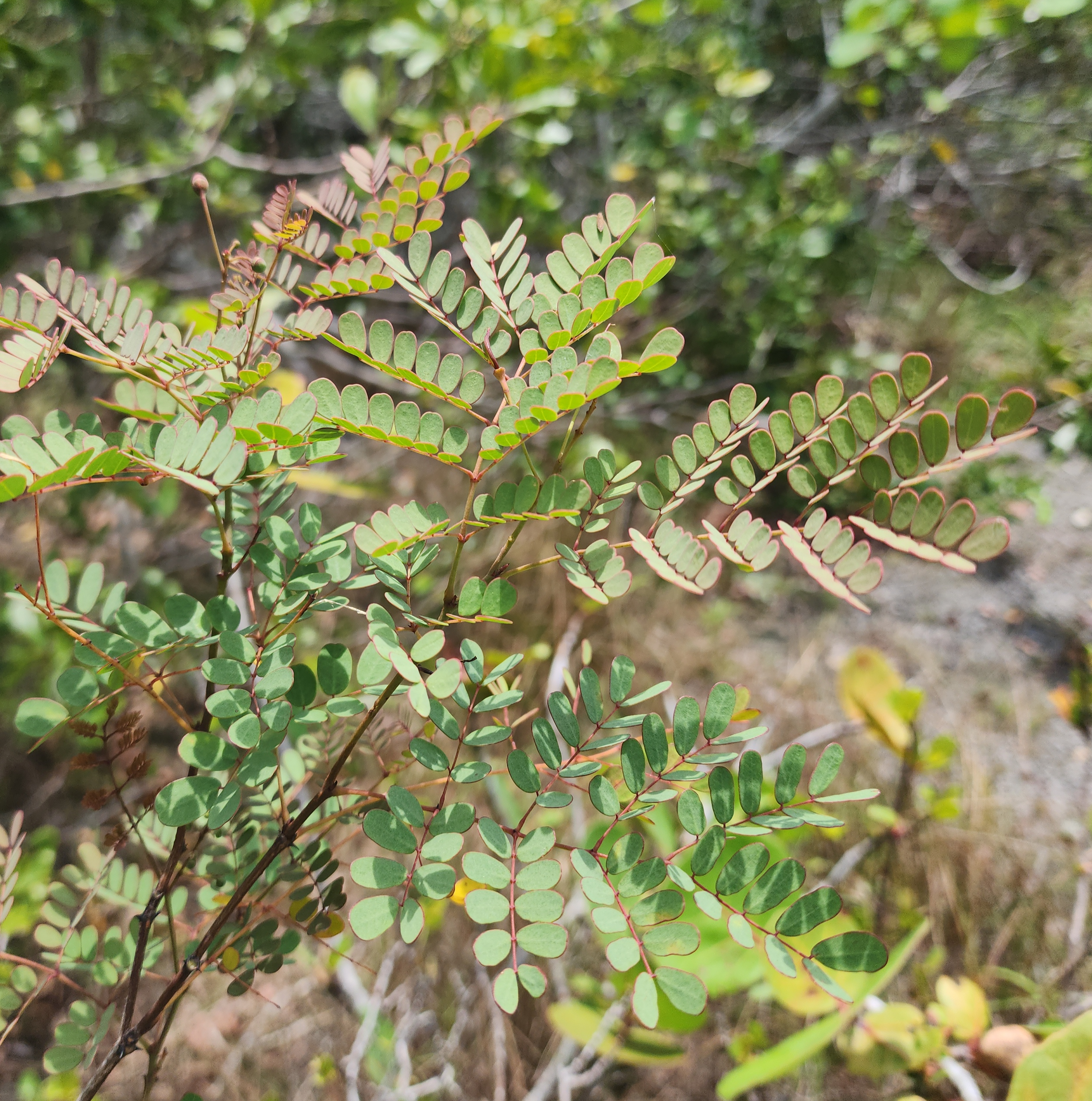
Unique foliage

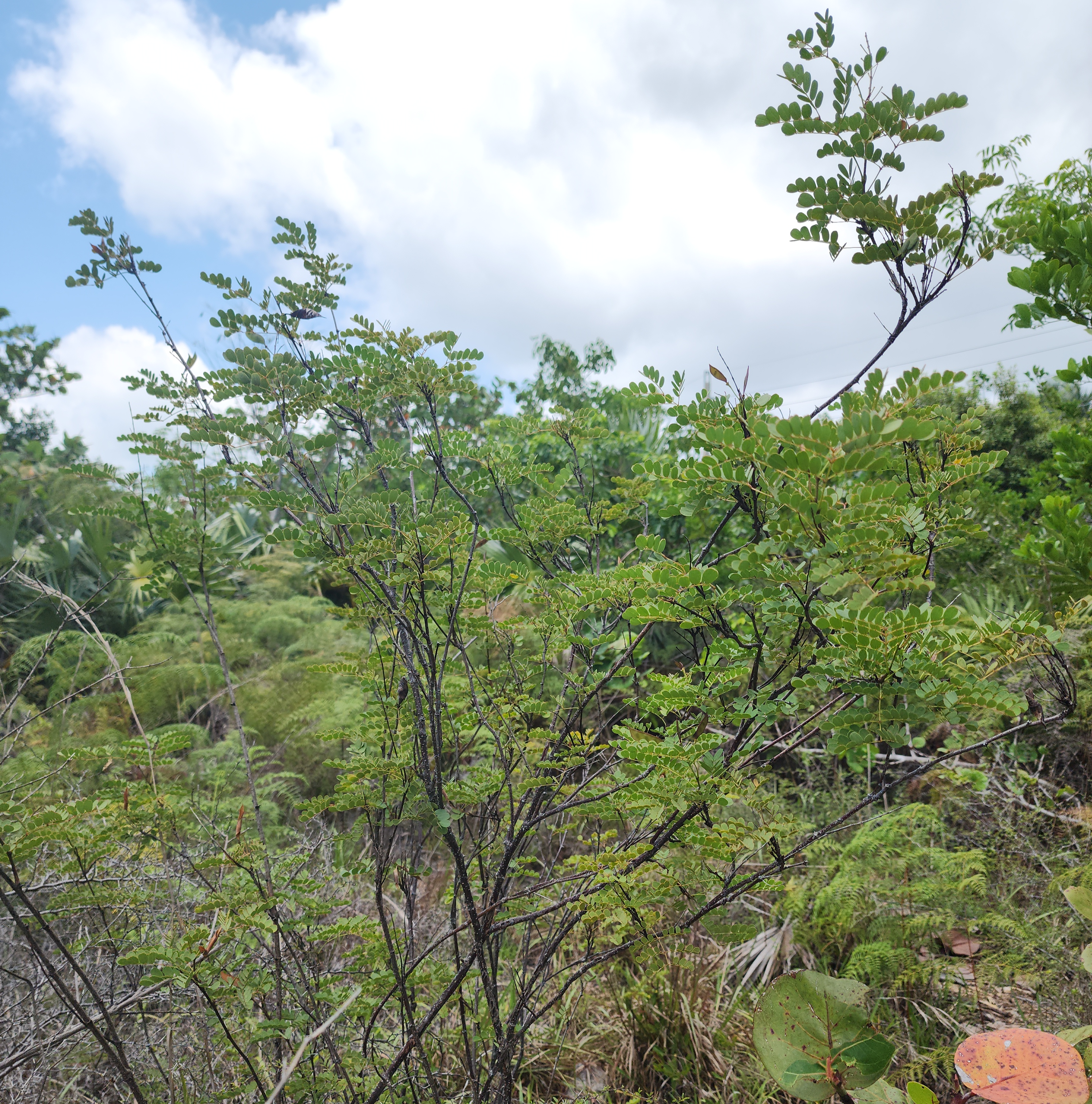
Larger individual growing as a sprawling shrub
