= South Florida rocklands =

Tropical and subtropical moist broadleaf forests ecoregion of Florida, United States

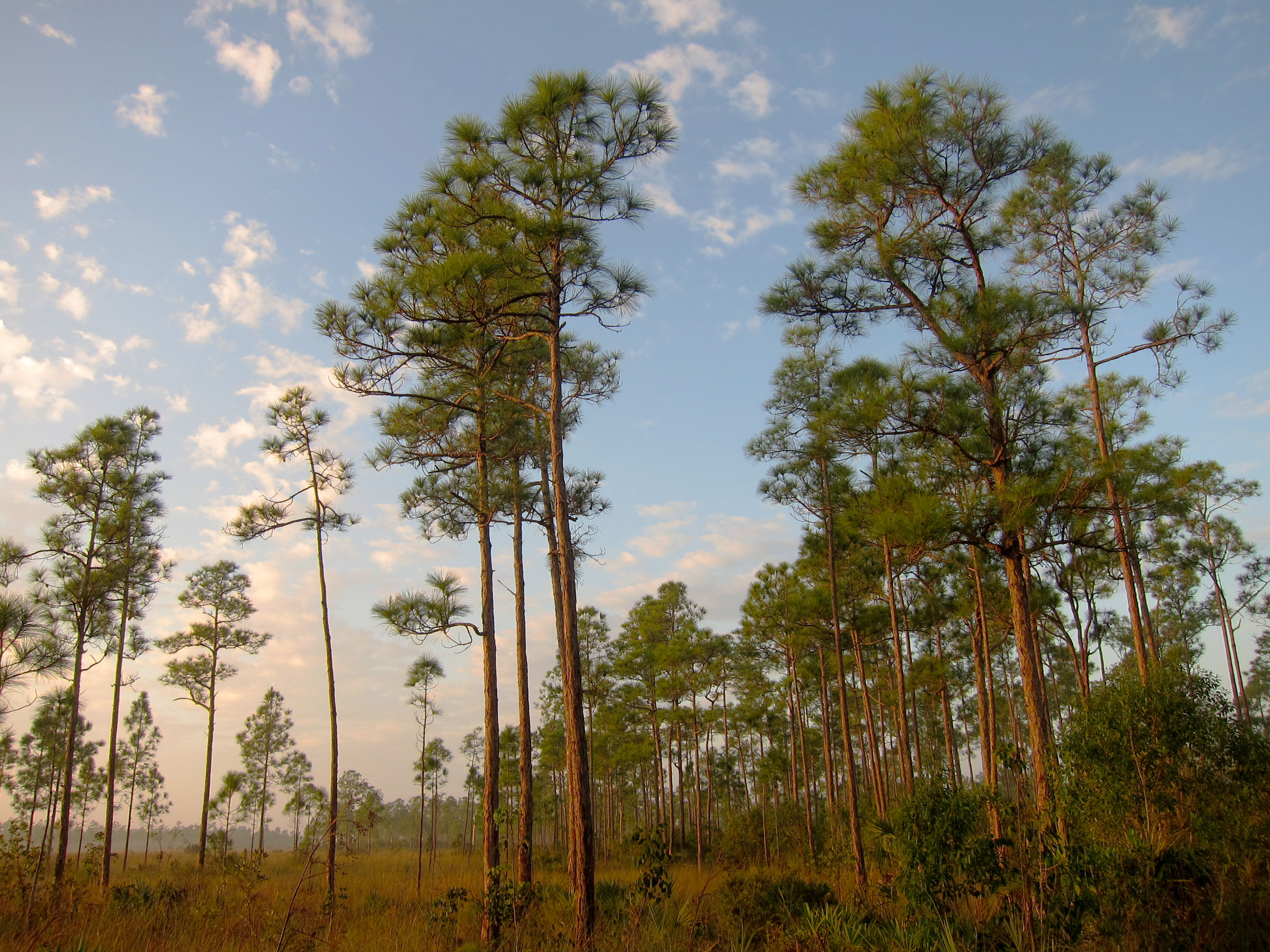
- Pine rockland in the Everglades

Ecology
- Realm: Neotropical
- Biome: Tropical and subtropical moist broadleaf forests
- Borders: Everglades
- Bird species: 176
- Mammal species: 36

Geography
- Area: 2,100 km^{2} (810 mi^{2})
- Country: United States
- State: Florida
- Coordinates: 25°N 81°W
- Climate type: Tropical savanna (Aw)

Conservation
- Habitat loss: 98.2%
- Protected: 1.8%

The South Florida rocklands ecoregion, in the tropical and subtropical moist broadleaf forests biome, occurs in southern Florida and the Florida Keys in the United States, where they would naturally cover an area of 2,100 km^{2} (810 sq mi). These forests form on limestone outcrops with very thin soil; the higher elevation separating them from other habitats such as coastal marshes and marl prairies. On mainland Florida, rocklands exist primarily on the Miami Rock Ridge, which extends from the Miami River south to Everglades National Park. South Florida rocklands are further divided into pine rocklands and rockland hammocks.

== Pine rockland ==
=== Description ===
The pine rocklands are a critically imperiled ecosystem located in southern Florida, the Bahamas, Turks and Caicos Islands, and Cuba. Its location in south Florida and throughout the Caribbean Archipelago straddles the southern and northern ends of the temperate and tropical flora ranges, respectively. This helps explain why the pine rocklands are home to a wide variety of plants and animals, many of which are endemic to Florida, south Florida, or the pine rockland itself. It is characterized by an open canopy of South Florida slash pine (Pinus elliotti var. densa), a patchy subcanopy of palms and shrubs, and an extremely diverse herbaceous layer, growing atop Miami oolitic limestone. Historically, the landscape was maintained by frequent low-intensity fires, but urbanization, agricultural expansion, exotic invasion and fragmentation have led to fire suppression and severe changes in plant community composition.

=== Distribution ===
In south Florida, pine rocklands occur in Miami-Dade County, Monroe County, the Lower Keys, Everglades National Park, and Big Cypress National Preserve, but can also be found throughout the Caribbean Archipelago. Despite its range, the pine rocklands are limited in distribution. Urban development, agricultural expansion, and extreme fragmentation since the late 1800s have severely reduced the extent of its range. Of the original estimated 65,450 ha of Miami-Dade County pine rockland, around 920 ha, or 2%, remain outside of Everglades National Park. The remaining fragments scattered across the county are protected as public parks or Environmentally Endangered Lands and range in size from 0.1 ha to 324 ha, with the average size being 6 ha and the median being 1.7 ha. The Long Pine Key portion in Everglades National Park still holds around 9915 ha, or 80% of all pine rockland found in Florida. Limited reserves found in the Lower Keys are decreasing due to fire suppression and salt-water intrusion via rising sea levels.

=== Physiography ===
The pine rocklands in Miami-Dade County and Everglades National Park are found on limestone substrates along the Miami Rock Ridge, an exposed oolitic limestone matrix 2–7 meters above sea level that extends from northern Miami to the southern Everglades with disjunct sections in the Lower Keys. This limestone is extremely sharp, porous, and prone to weathering and dissolution and which help form their characteristic solution holes. These holes can house water, sand, or organic soil, and contribute to small changes in elevation that result in substantial changes in vegetation. Interlaced with the limestone ridge are lower elevation wet prairies and marshes and higher elevation rock hammocks. These wet prairies and marshes create an island-like effect isolating the higher elevated pine rocklands.

This interaction between elevation and water is particularly evident in Long Pine Key in Everglades National Park. Sections of Long Pine Key flood anywhere from 20 to 60 days per year. However, the hydrology of south Florida has changed drastically since the 1950s due to urban expansion and increased agricultural practices. The limestone of the Miami Rock Ridge was perfect for development, and subsequent drainage has led to a significant decrease in the water table. A lowered water table may harm sites prone to seasonal flooding and may increase the risk of salt-water intrusion. The Comprehensive Everglades Restoration Plan is an attempt to restore the hydrology of the Everglades.

=== Flora ===
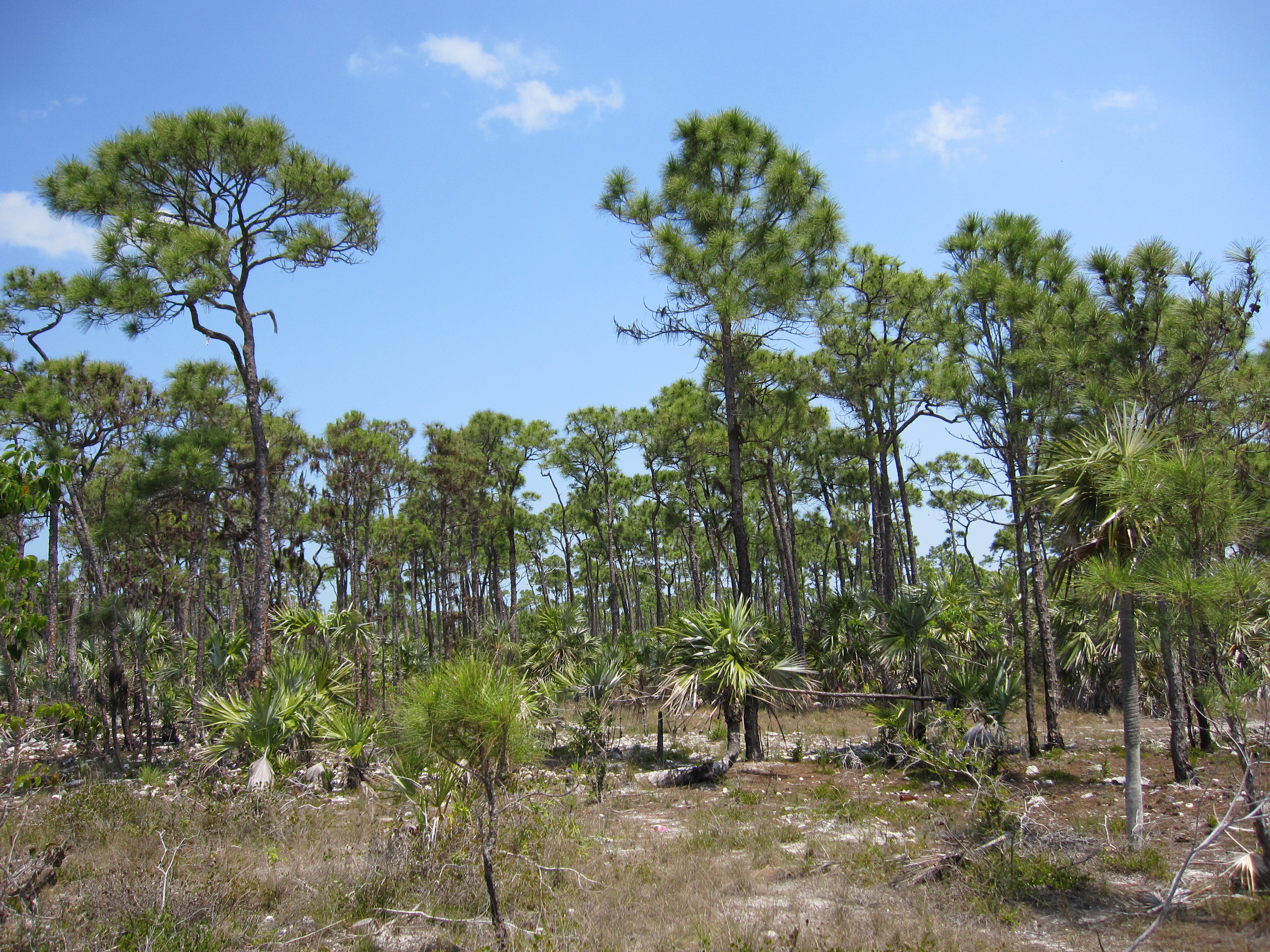
South Florida rocklands at Blue Hole, Big Pine Key

The south Florida pine rockland is unique geographically. Southern Florida is located at the southern end of the temperate North American Floristic Region and at the northern end of the tropical Caribbean Floristic Region. This location allows for the mixture of vegetation from two distinct areas at the extremes of their ranges. Around 9% of all pine rockland plants found in Miami-Dade County alone are endemic to Florida, and around 14 taxa are endemic to the Miami-Dade pine rockland itself. Overall, there are over 537 plant species found throughout the south Florida rocklands.

Pine rocklands are defined by an open canopy of South Florida slash pine with heights ranging from 20–24 meters, but can be less due to past disturbance. Seedlings are fire adapted and spend 2 to 5 years in the "grass stage" building nutrient reserves to facilitate growth above normal fire heights. Many sites were logged extensively in the early 1990s reducing slash pine coverage and killing understory vegetation. Subsequent plantings in the late 1980s led to many even-aged stands with different stand densities.

The subcanopy is dominated by a variety of palms and tropical hardwoods, depending on the location, substrate, and fire regime. Pine rocklands in the lower Keys often have high amounts of Thrinax and Coccothrinax, while rocklands in Miami-Dade County have high amounts of Sabal palmetto, Ficus aurea, and Serenoa repens. Sites that share borders with hardwood hammocks or that are infrequently burned will have high amounts of hardwood species, including Metopium toxiferum, Quercus elliotti, Quercus virginiana, Sideroxylon salicifolium, and Lysiloma latisiliquum. The shrub layer near wet prairies and marshes is composed of wetland species such as Acacia pinetorum, Sambucus canadensis, and Taxodium ascendens.

The herbaceous layer is extremely diverse and home to several species considered rare, endangered, threatened or critically imperiled by one or more agencies. Many species found in rocklands throughout south Florida are restricted to individual plots or to specific regions due to changes in soil type, extreme fragmentation, and fire suppression. Most plants are fire-adapted and depend on frequent burning to limit shading and increased humidity from encroaching hardwood species. Grasses and sedges including Andropogon spp., Schizachyrium spp., Muhlenbergia capillaris, Arsitida purpurascens, and Rhynchospora spp. dominate the landscape. Flowering species include Croton linearis, Pinguicula pumilla, Angadenia berteroi, Amorpha herbacea var. crenulate, and a number of different Euphorbia spp.

=== Fire ===
Fire plays a critical role in maintaining the vegetative community. It is estimated that around 70% of the state's terrestrial plant species are fired-adapted, fire-dependent, or pyrogenic, probably resulting from the state's high incidence of lightning strikes. In fact, the Florida landscape is estimated to have been dominated by dry season lightning-induced and human-ignited fires. Most of the native plant species found in pine rocklands are adapted to periodic fires, with increased abundance and flowering of native plants found in plots post-burn. These fires help curb hardwood encroachment, spur pine regeneration, and allow light to reach the herbaceous layer. In the absence of fire, hardwood species from nearby hardwood hammocks invade and shade out natural vegetation. As the density of hardwood species increases, fire effectiveness decreases due to the increase in humidity and accumulation of poor fire fuels. This ecotone between pine rockland and hardwood hammock is clear when natural or frequent, low-intensity prescribed fires occur. In the absence of frequent fire, this distinction becomes less apparent.

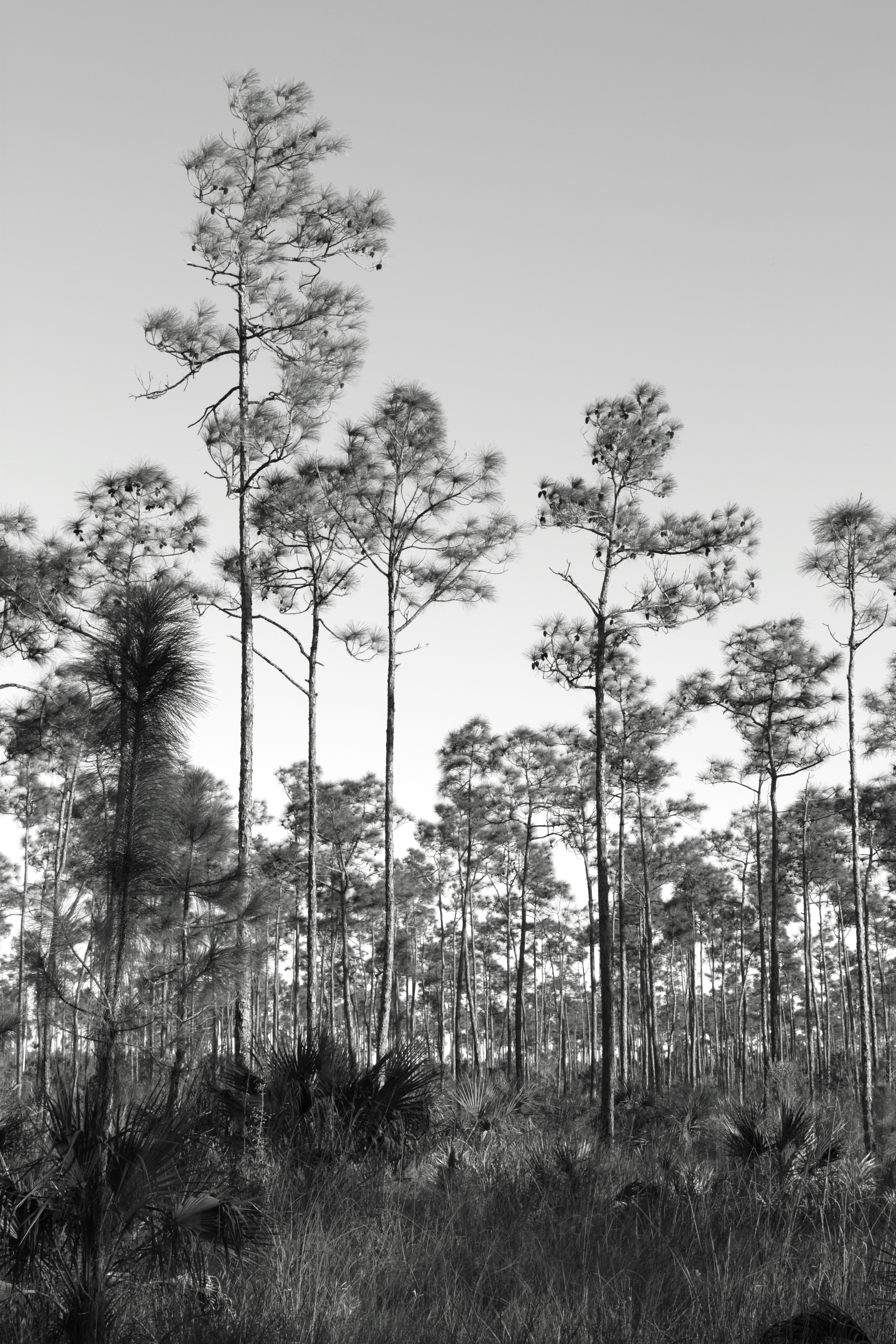
South Florida pine rocklands in Everglades National Park

Presently, many isolated pine rockland sites throughout Miami-Dade County and the lower Keys suffer from fire suppression, leading to drastically altered plant compositions. It is estimated that around 5,000,000 ha of pine rocklands burned in 1926, whereas only 76,486 ha burned in 1995 and 2003. Most sites located in Miami-Dade County and the lower Keys are located near residential or commercial lots and are often unable to implement prescribed burns. The longer fire is suppressed, the harder and more dangerous it is to prescribe effective burns. Fuel loads increase between fires and result in hotter and higher flames. Fires that are too high or intense can result in crown fire or mortality at all levels of the canopy, including below ground biomass. Frequent fire is used to great effect in the Long Pine Key in Everglades National Park.

== Rockland hammock ==
Rockland hammocks form on regions of rockland where a lack of fire has allowed hardwood trees to become dominant, nearly all of which are tropical in origin. Natural firebreaks include exposed limestone cliffs and solution sinkholes. Canopy species include gumbo-limbo (Bursera simaruba), paradise tree (Simarouba glauca), pigeonplum (Coccoloba diversifolia), Florida strangler fig (Ficus aurea), false mastic (Sideroxylon foetidissimum), willow bustic (Dipholis salicifolia), short-leaf fig (Ficus citrifolia), false tamarind (Lysiloma latisiliquum), West Indian mahogany (Swietenia mahagoni), and pepperleaf sweetwood (Licaria triandra). Epiphytes that grow in the canopy include Spanish moss (Tillandsia usneoides) and ball moss (T. recurvata).

Plants such as black ironwood (Krugiodendron ferreum), inkwood (Exothea paniculata), lancewood (Damburneya coriacea), marlberry (Ardisia escallonoides), poisonwood (Metopium toxiferum), satinleaf (Chrysophyllum oliviforme), white stopper (Eugenia axillaris), shiny oysterwood (Gymnanthes lucida), wild coffee (Psychotria nervosa), shortleaf wild coffee (Psychotria tenuifolia), and pale lidflower (Calyptranthes pallens) grow in the understory.

Southern live oak (Quercus virginiana), a temperate species, can be found on hammock margins.

Colubrina cubensis has been documented in Florida rockland hammock.

== Conservation ==
Because of its high elevation, the Miami Rock Ridge was the first area to be impacted by development. The clearing of large tracts for development has now reduced the pine rocklands to about 20,000 acres (81 km^{2}), most of which are now protected inside the Everglades National Park. Camp Everglades is a 253-acre (102 ha) campground owned by the Boy Scouts and located within the park. The pine forest is fire dependent, and the flora and fauna have adapted to the frequent fires ignited by summer lightning storms. The camp has prescribed fires that help maintain the forest.

== See also ==
- List of ecoregions in the United States (WWF)
- Bahamian dry forests
- Bahamian pineyards
- Pine barren
