= Blue Hole (Big Pine Key) =

Attraction on the island of Big Pine Key in the Florida Keys

Coordinates: 24.705844°N 81.380759°W

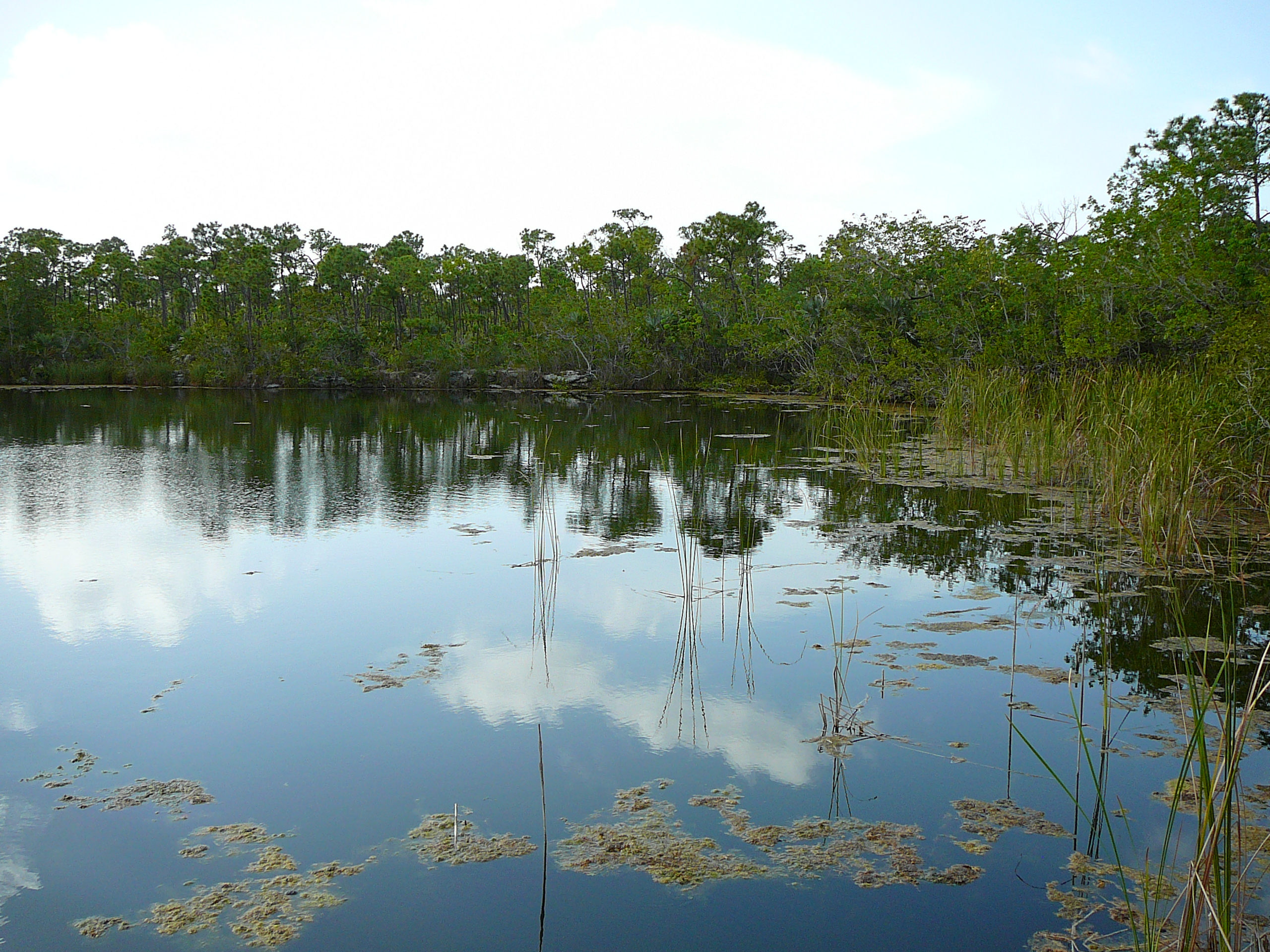
The Blue Hole is the only fresh water lake in the Florida Keys.

The Blue Hole is an attraction on the island of Big Pine Key in the Florida Keys. It is an abandoned rock quarry that was used for nearby road fills and Henry Flagler's Overseas Railroad. The water it contains is mostly fresh and is used by various wildlife in the area, such as birds, snakes, alligators, key deer and green iguanas. It is part of the National Key Deer Refuge.

== Gallery ==
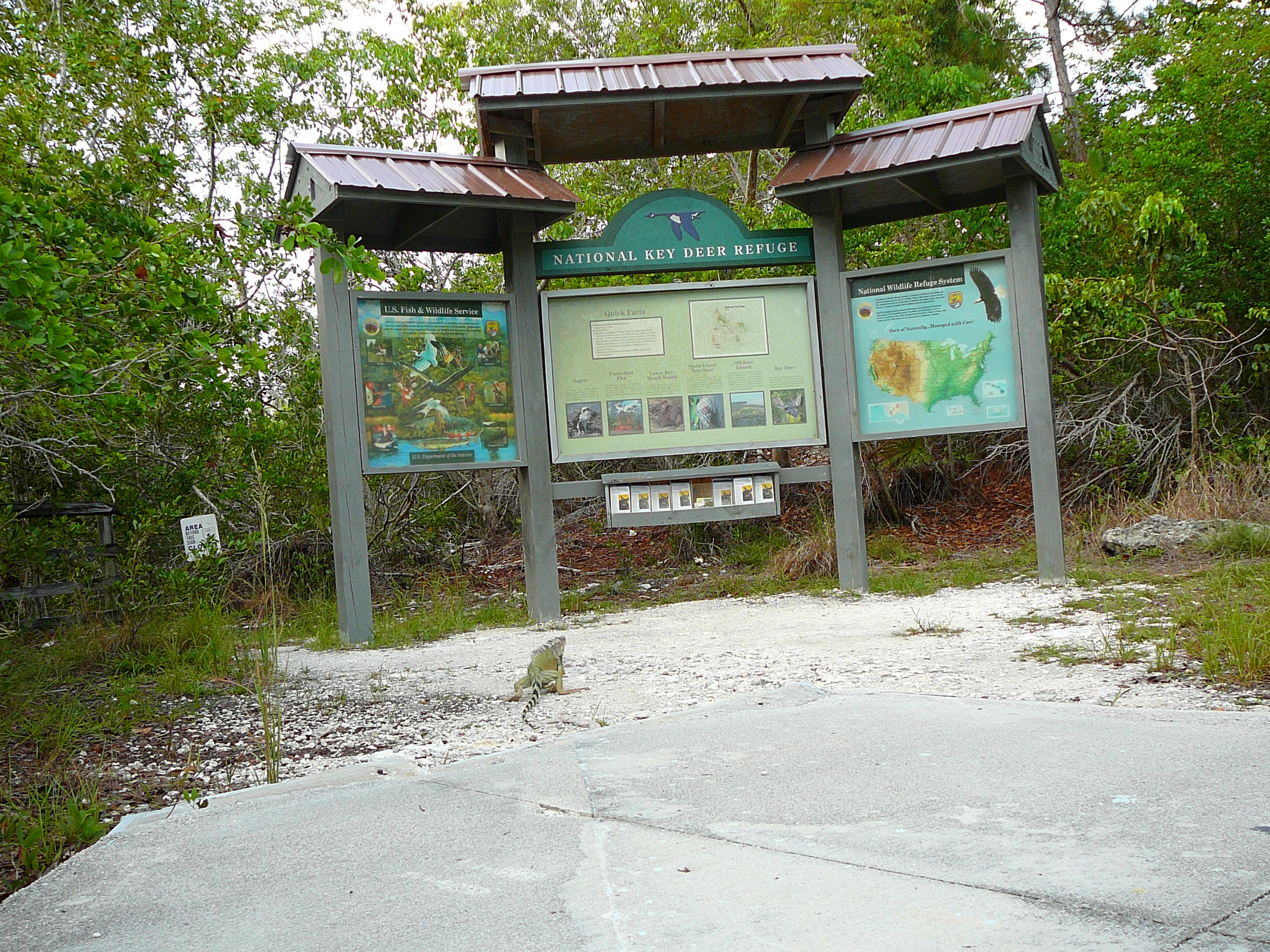
Park sign, along with one of the many green iguanas that have invaded the area
