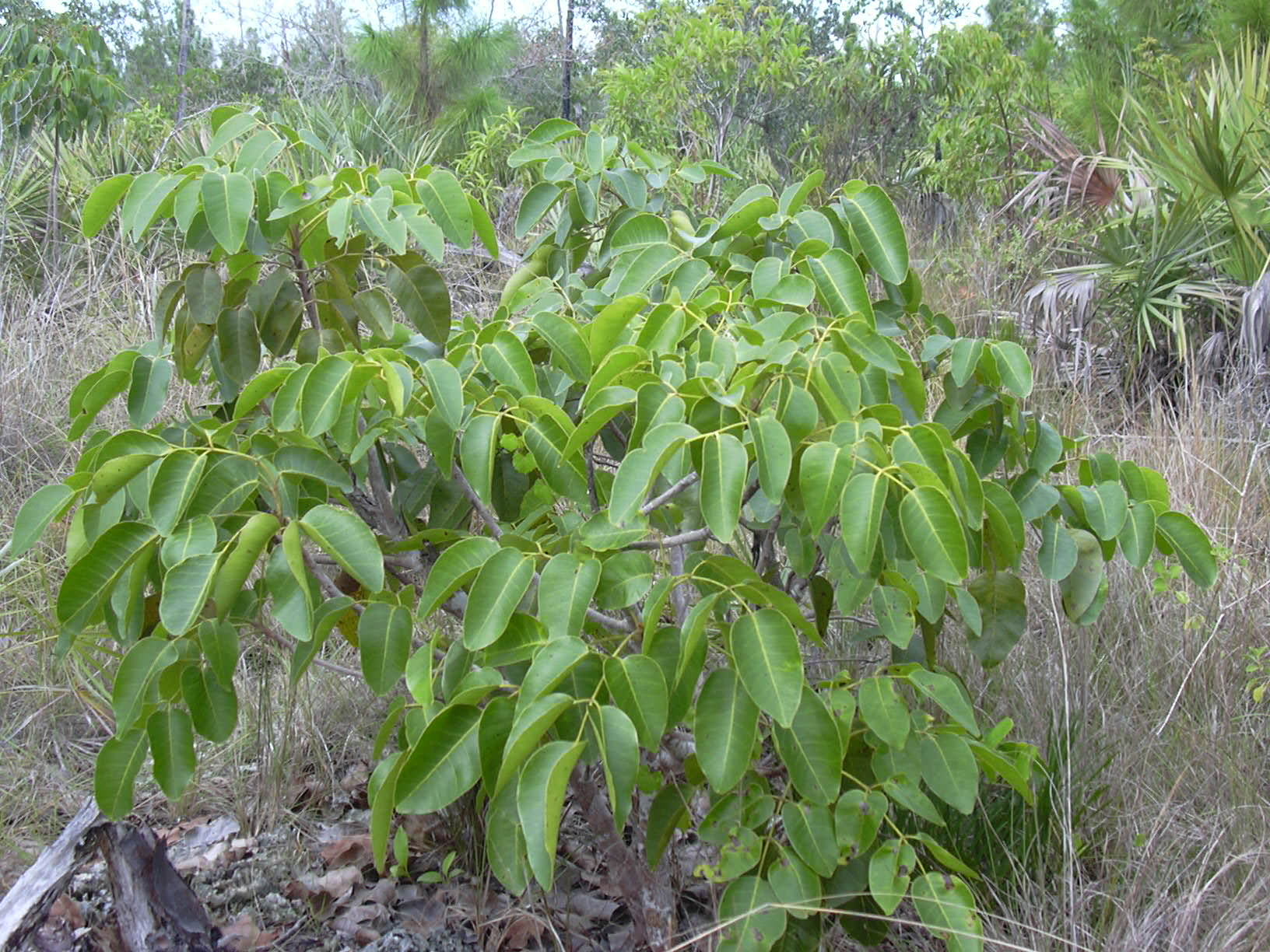
- Metopium toxiferum

Scientific classification
- Kingdom: Plantae
- Clade: Tracheophytes
- Clade: Angiosperms
- Clade: Eudicots
- Clade: Rosids
- Order: Sapindales
- Family: Anacardiaceae
- Subfamily: Anacardioideae
- Genus: Metopium; P.Browne

Type species
- Metopium brownei (Jacq.) Urb.

Species
- See text

= Metopium =

Genus of flowering plants

Metopium or poisonwood is a genus of flowering plants in the sumac family, Anacardiaceae. They are dioecious trees with poisonous sap that can induce contact dermatitis.

== Taxonomy ==
=== Species ===
As of August 2021, Plants of the World online has 4 accepted species:

- Metopium brownei (Jacq.) Urb. — black poisonwood
- Metopium gentlei Lundell
- Metopium toxiferum (L.) Krug & Urb. — Florida poisonwood
- Metopium venosum (Griseb.) Engl. — Cuban poisonwood
