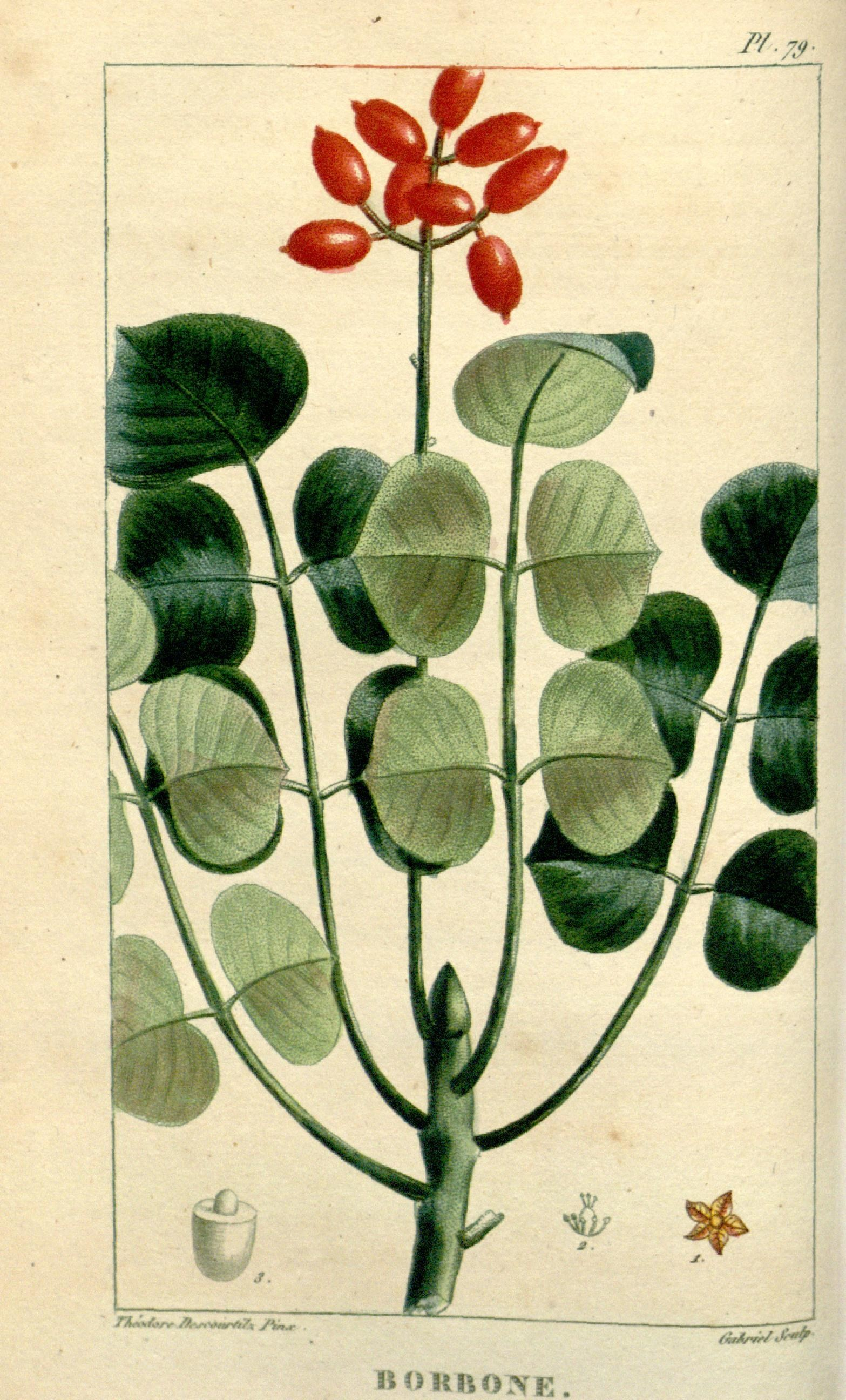

Conservation status
- Least Concern (IUCN 3.1)

Scientific classification
- Kingdom: Plantae
- Clade: Tracheophytes
- Clade: Angiosperms
- Clade: Eudicots
- Clade: Rosids
- Order: Sapindales
- Family: Anacardiaceae
- Genus: Metopium
- Species: M. brownei

Binomial name
- Metopium brownei Roxb.

= Metopium brownei =

Species of flowering plant

Metopium brownei (also known as chechem, chechen, or black poisonwood) is a species of plant in the family Anacardiaceae.

== Distribution and habitat ==
It is found in Hispaniola (the Dominican Republic and Haiti), Cuba, Jamaica, northern Guatemala, Belize, and from the Yucatán to Veracruz in Mexico.

== Description ==
Like its cousin, Metopium toxiferum, it produces urushiol in its bark, which can cause contact dermatitis; therefore, live trees and fresh cut logs should be handled carefully. The wood of this tree is a valuable source of lumber in Central America and the West Indies.

== Folklore ==
In the Yucatec Maya oral tradition, the chechém (Metopium brownei) and chaka (Bursera simaruba) trees originate from the legend of two brothers, Kinch and Tizic. The brothers, who embodied opposing natures (one gentle and one wrathful), fell in love with the same woman, Nicté-Ha. Their bitter rivalry culminated in a fatal battle where they died in each other's arms. With their final breaths, they begged the gods to let them see Nicté-Ha one more time. In answer, the deities transformed them into adjacent trees - the poisonous chechém representing the violent brother and the medicinal chaka representing the peaceful one - while Nicté-Ha became their shared flower, forever binding the three together.
