= National Key Deer Refuge =

Protected area in Monroe County, Florida, USA

- IUCN category IV (habitat/species management area)
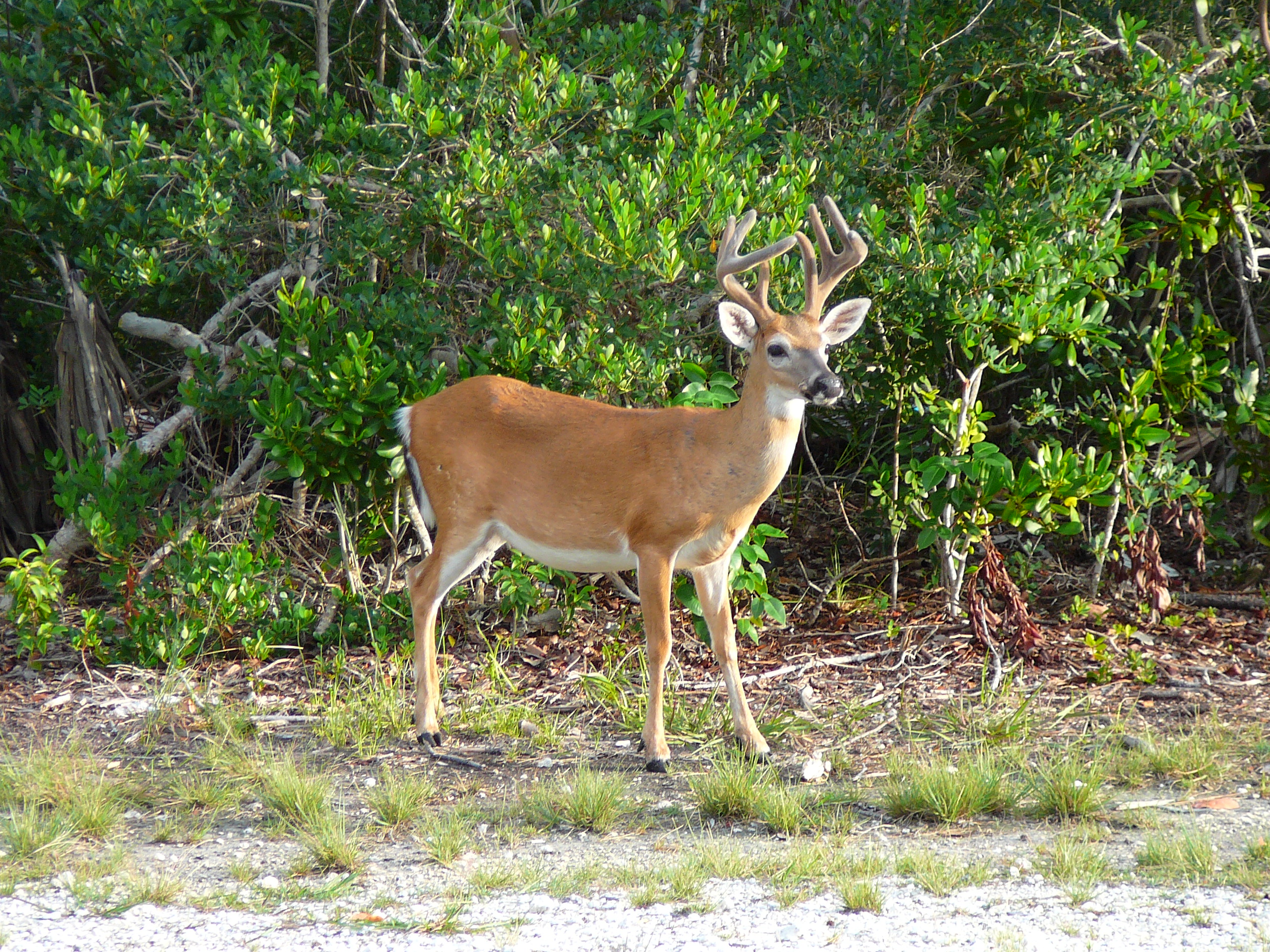
- Male Key deer on No Name Key in the Florida Keys.

- Location within Florida Location within the United States
- Location: Monroe County, Florida, United States
- Nearest city: Big Pine Key, Florida
- Coordinates: 24°44′N 81°24′W
- Area: 8,542 acres (34.57 km^{2})
- Established: 1957
- Governing body: U.S. Fish and Wildlife Service
- Website: National Key Deer Refuge

The National Key Deer Refuge is a 8,542-acre (3,457 ha) National Wildlife Refuge located on Big Pine Key and No Name Key in the Florida Keys in Monroe County, Florida.

== Overview ==
=== Fauna ===
The refuge is home to the endangered Key deer, a subspecies of the white-tailed deer that is endemic to the Florida Keys and has a current population of around 800 animals. 21 other threatened and endangered species of plants and animals are also found on the refuge.

=== Geography ===
The refuge which includes 2,400 acres (970 ha) of upland forests, 5,100 acres (2,100 ha) of wetlands, and 1,050 acres (420 ha) of marsh. 2,278 acres (922 ha) of the refuge have been designated as a wilderness area.

Crocodile Lake National Wildlife Refuge, Great White Heron NWR, and Key West NWR are administered by the National Key Deer Refuge.
