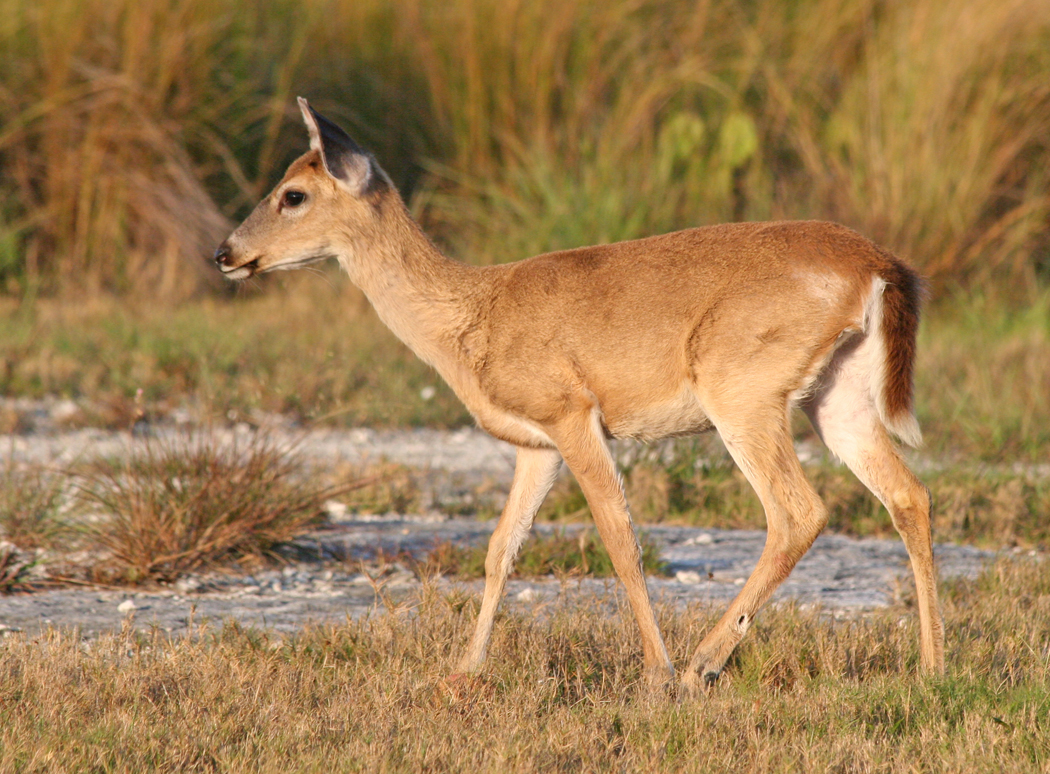
- A female on Big Pine Key

Conservation status
- Critically Imperiled (NatureServe)

- Endangered (ESA)

Scientific classification
- Kingdom: Animalia
- Phylum: Chordata
- Class: Mammalia
- Order: Artiodactyla
- Family: Cervidae
- Subfamily: Capreolinae
- Genus: Odocoileus
- Species: O. virginianus
- Subspecies: O. v. clavium

Trinomial name
- Odocoileus virginianus clavium Barbour & G. M. Allen, 1922
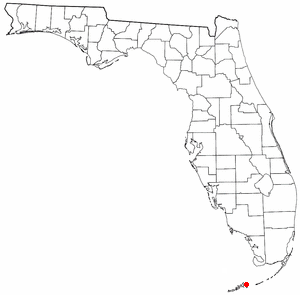
- Key Deer range

= Key deer =

Subspecies of deer endemic to the Florida Keys

The Key deer (Odocoileus virginianus clavium) is an endangered subspecies of the white-tailed deer that lives only in the Florida Keys. It is the smallest extant North American deer subspecies.

== Description ==
This deer can be recognized by its characteristic size, smaller than all other white-tailed deer. Adult males (known as bucks) usually weigh 25–34 kg (55–75 lb) and stand about 76 cm (30 in) tall at the shoulder. Adult females (does) usually weigh between 20 and 29 kg (44 and 64 lb) and have an average height of 66 cm (26 in) at the shoulders. The deer is a reddish-brown to grey-brown in color. Antlers are grown by males and shed between February and March and regrown by June. When the antlers are growing, they have a white velvet coating. The subspecies otherwise generally resembles other white-tailed deer in appearance.

== Behavior ==
Key deer easily swim between islands. Living close to humans, they have little of the natural fear of humans shown by most of their larger mainland relatives (an example of island tameness). The deer are often found in residents' yards and along roadsides where plants and flowers grow. This often results in car-to-deer collisions, as the deer are more active (and harder to avoid) at night. Seeing them at dusk and dawn is not unusual.

== Breeding ==
Breeding occurs all year, but peaks in October and December. Territorial activity is limited to defending a receptive doe from other bucks. Longevity records are 9 years for males and 7 years for females. Adult females form loose matriarchal groups with one or two generations of offspring, while bucks feed and bed together only outside the breeding season.

== Distribution and habitat ==
The range of the Key deer originally encompassed all of the lower Florida Keys (where standing water pools exist), but is now limited to a stretch of the Florida Keys from about Sugarloaf Key to Bahia Honda Key. Key deer use all islands during the wet season when drinking water is more generally available, retreating to islands with a perennial supply of fresh water in dry months. By August 2019, most individuals were living on only one of the Florida Key islands, Big Pine Key. Key deer inhabit nearly all habitats within their range, including pine rocklands, hardwood hammocks, mangroves, and freshwater wetlands.

== Diet ==
The species feeds on over 150 types of plants, but mangroves (red, white, and black), silver palm fruit and thatch palm berries make up the most important parts of their diets. Pine rockland habitat is important, as well, because it is often the only reliable source of fresh drinking water (Key deer can tolerate drinking only mildly brackish water). Habitat destruction due to human encroachment causes many deer to feed on non-native ornamental plants, which may only increase the likelihood of human conflict.

== History ==
The Key deer is a subspecies of white-tailed deer which migrated to the Florida Keys from the mainland over a land bridge during the Wisconsin glaciation. The earliest known written reference to Key deer comes from the writings of Hernando de Escalante Fontaneda, a Spanish sailor shipwrecked in the Florida Keys and captured by Native Americans in the 1550s.

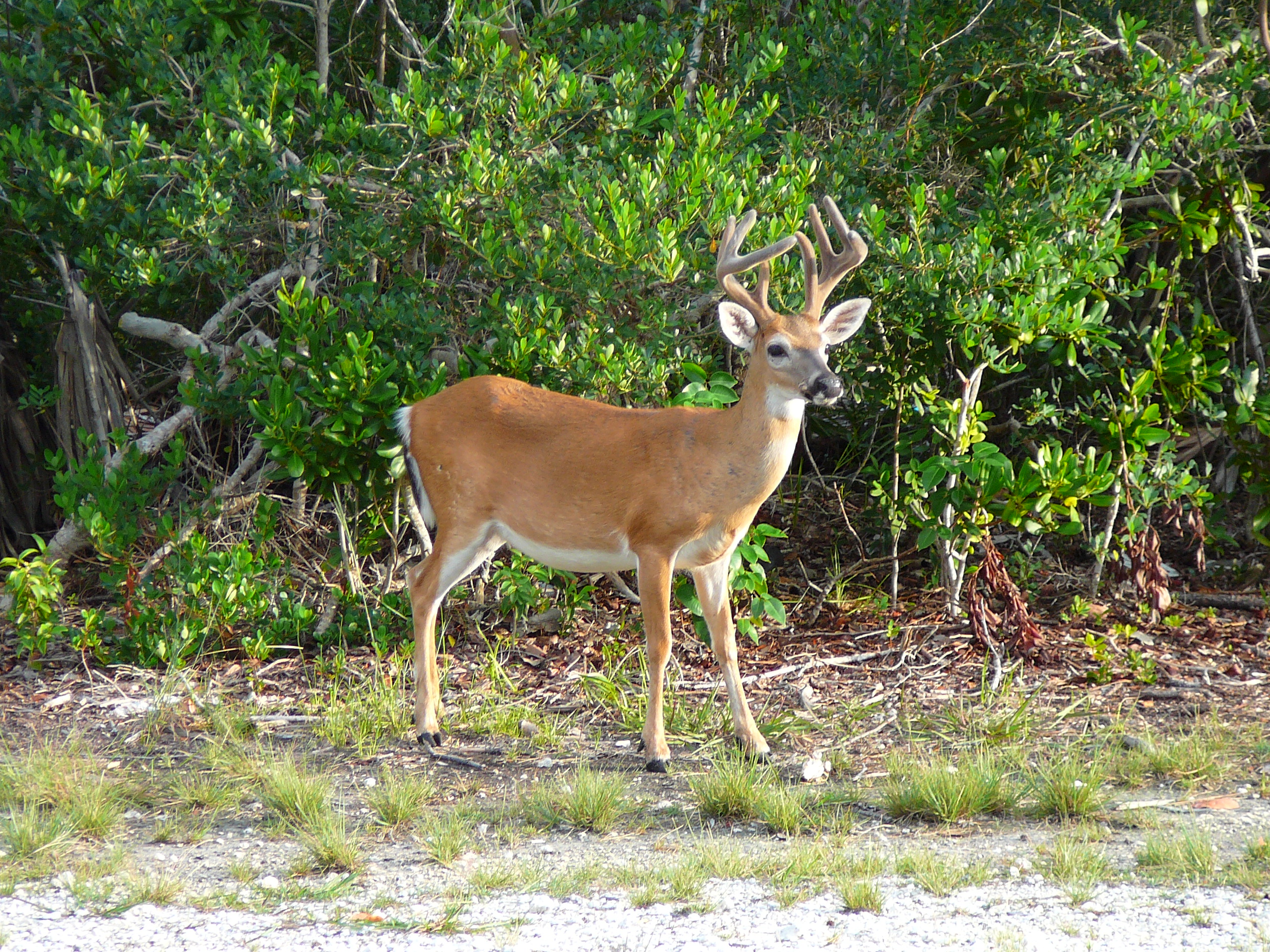
A male Key Deer on No Name Key in the lower Keys

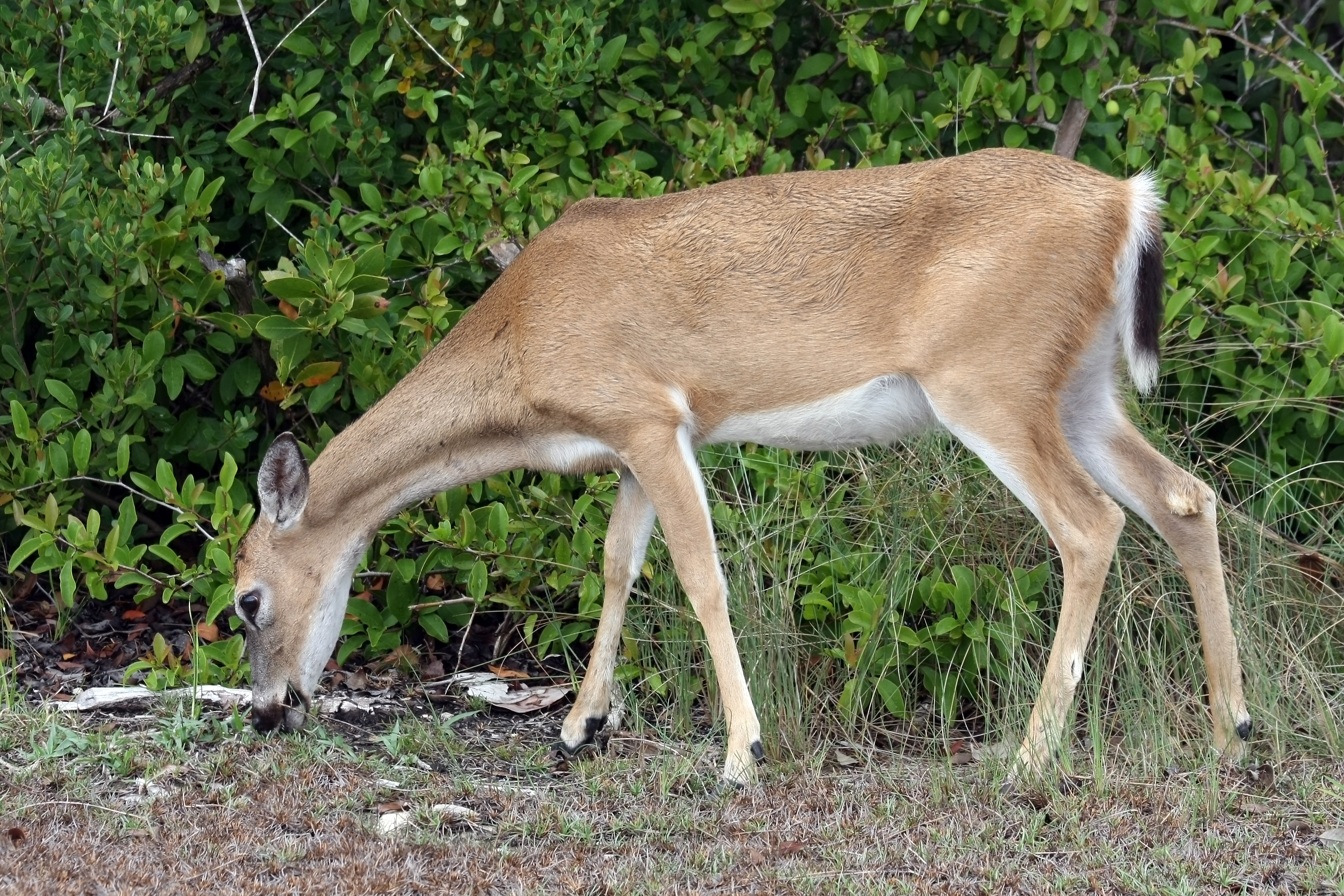
A female Key deer on Big Pine Key

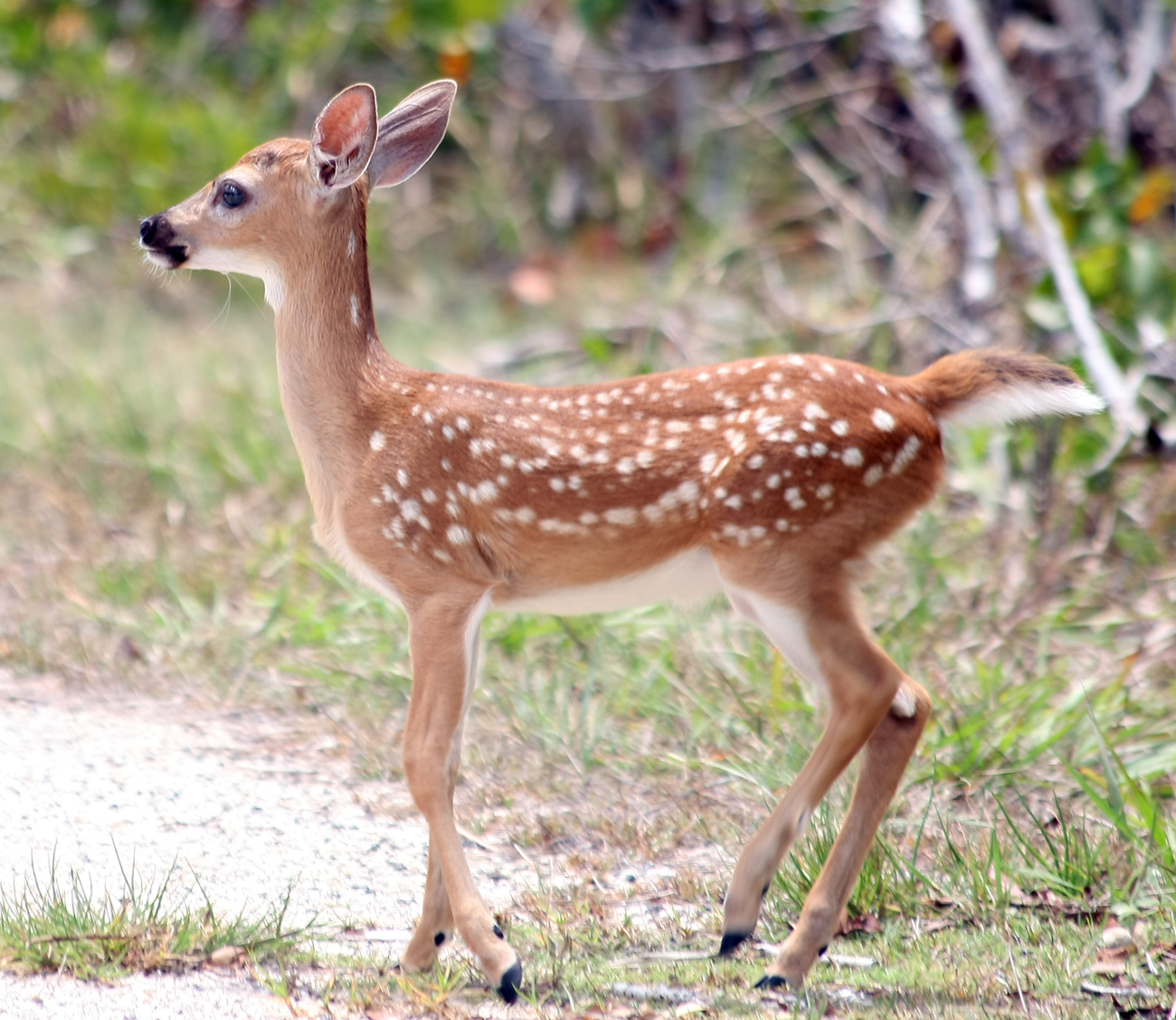
A juvenile Key deer is called a fawn.

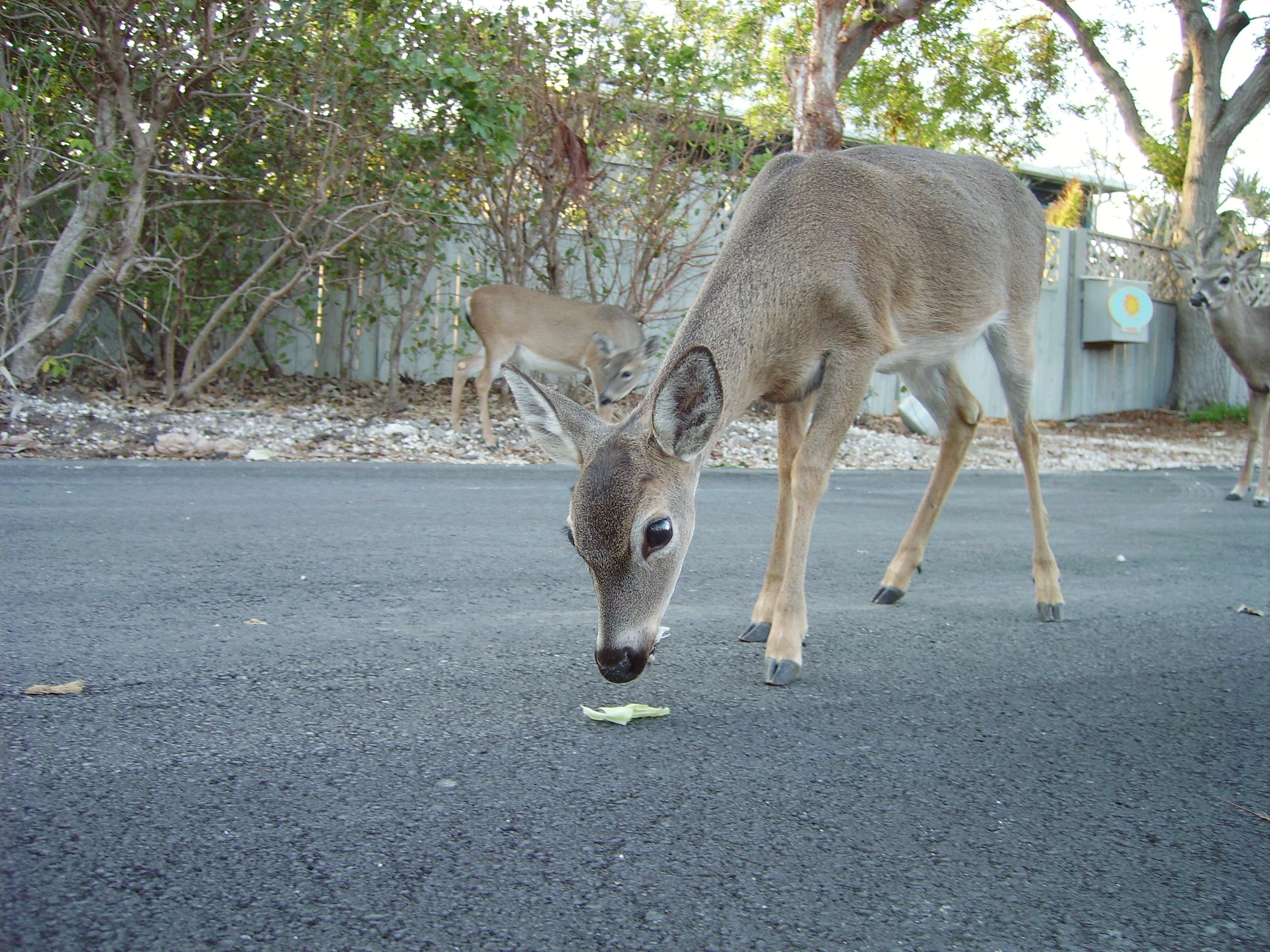
Due to proximity, most Key deer have lost their fear of humans. This, besides habitat loss, is the main reason why they have become endangered.

=== Endangered status ===
Key deer were hunted as a food supply by native tribes, passing sailors, and early settlers. Hunting them was banned in 1939, but widespread poaching and habitat destruction caused the subspecies to plummet to near-extinction by the 1950s. The National Key Deer Refuge, a federally administered National Wildlife Refuge operated by the Wildlife Service, was established in 1957.

Recent population estimates put the population between 700 and 800, putting it on the list of endangered species. Road kills from drivers on US 1, which traverses the deer's small range, are also a major threat, averaging between 125 and 150 kills per year, 70% of the annual mortality.

The population has been affected by the fragmentation, destruction and degradation of its habitat, generally due to urbanization. Human feeding of deer has also proven problematic, as the animals become dependent on this food source. Fences have become an obstacle to migration and dispersal.

However, the population has made an encouraging rise since 1955, when population estimates ranged as low as 25, and appears to have stabilized in recent years. Still, recent human encroachment into the fragile habitat and the deer's relatively low rate of reproduction point to an uncertain future for the subspecies. In August 2019 the USFWS recommended that the Key deer be "delisted due to recovery". The species remained listed, but its recovery plan was amended in 2022 to specify the conditions in which delisting or downlisting would be appropriate.

The ongoing rise in sea level, owing to climate change, is a new threat to its remaining habitat on the islands of southern Florida. Beginning in 2023 when assisted migration was newly authorized as a recovery option for endangered species, Key deer was among the animal species mentioned in the press that might have no other option for escaping extinction in its historical range. A November 2023 news article about the 50th anniversary of the Endangered Species Act summed up the problem for Key deer this way: "Rising seas created the Key deer. Rapidly rising seas, a symptom of human-caused climate change, are challenging its continued existence and raising tough questions for the people trying to keep the nation's more than 1,300 other threatened and endangered species alive."

=== Screw worm infestation ===
In September 2016, a screw worm infestation was discovered (the first infestation of its kind in the U.S. since 1982) to be affecting the Key deer population, necessitating the euthanasia of affected animals. The screw worm is a fly larva that enters an open wound of a live animal and eats the flesh of the animal from within, leading to a gruesome death. The female fly mates once in her life, so the infestation can be battled by introducing sterile male flies to the population, causing the females to die out without laying fertile eggs. Other steps to battle the outbreak included injecting deer with antiparasitic drugs, fencing off healthy sections of the population, and tracking a portion of deer with radio collars. The pest was declared as eradicated in April 2017. The outbreak killed 135 deer, roughly an eighth of the herd.

== Conservation efforts ==
Conservation efforts include the establishment of the National Key Deer Refuge, which consists of about 8,500 acres (34 km^{2}) on Big Pine, No Name Key, and several smaller uninhabited islands. Not all of the refuge lands are protected as public lands; despite extensive efforts of the refuge to purchase these private habitat lands for protection in the refuge, about 5,000 acres (20 km^{2}) currently remain in private ownership and can potentially be developed. About 1,000 acres (4.0 km^{2}) of this privately developable land is on Big Pine Key and No Name Key, which are the central population areas for the deer. In 2006, a habitat conservation plan was enacted by Monroe County and the US Fish and Wildlife Service, which will limit development in primary habitat and provide for additional habitat purchases over the next 15 years. At the end of this period, however, most of the 1,000 acres (4.0 km^{2}) of privately owned habitat land on Big Pine and No Name Keys will still be open for further development. Thus, while the short term promises some cushion from extinction, the long-term prospects for the deer remain in doubt.

A portion of U.S. Route 1 was also elevated in 2003 to allow the deer to pass safely beneath the roadway, in an attempt to lessen the chance of road kills. However, no decrease in total traffic deaths has been seen.

The National Key Deer Refuge encourages people to help keep the Key deer wild by not feeding them. Feeding acclimates them to humans and vehicles, and makes them more likely to be hit and killed by vehicles. Also, hanging around people and developed areas in higher than normal densities makes them more susceptible to diseases, dog attacks, and entanglements in human trash, all of which can lead to increased injuries or death.

== Predation ==
In Florida, Key deer may be eaten by some growth stage of invasive snakes such as Burmese pythons, reticulated pythons, Southern African rock pythons, Central African rock pythons, boa constrictors, yellow anacondas, Bolivian anacondas, dark-spotted anacondas, and green anacondas.
