= No Name Key =

Island in the lower Florida Keys, United States

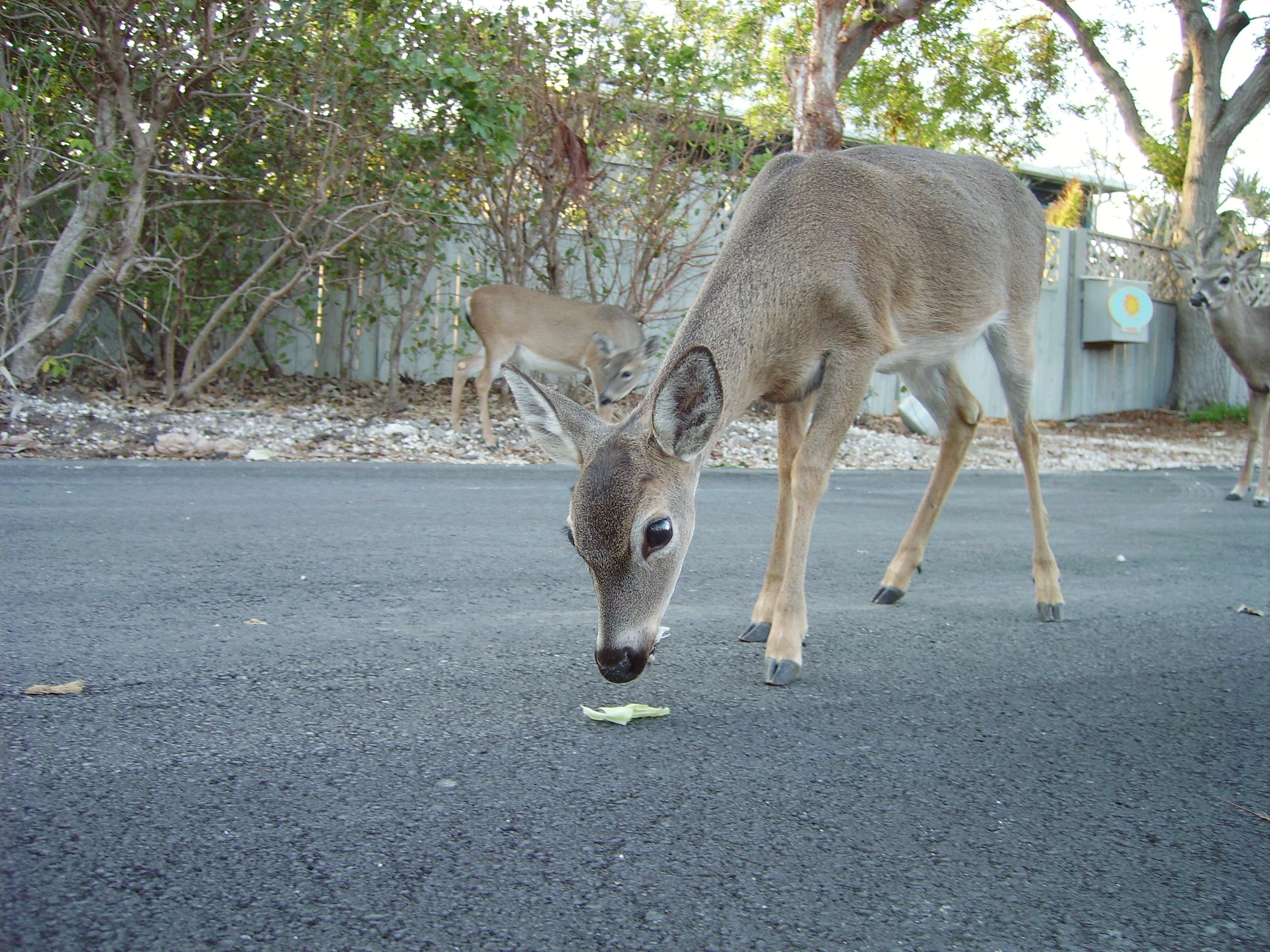
- Key deer walking on No Name Key

- No Name Key No Name Key (the Caribbean)

Geography
- Location: Gulf of Mexico
- Coordinates: 24.6926°N 81.3260°W
- Archipelago: Florida Keys
- Adjacent to: Florida Straits

Administration
- United States
- State: Florida
- County: Monroe

No Name Key is an island in the lower Florida Keys in the United States. It is 3 miles (4.8 km) from US 1 and sparsely populated, with only 43 homes. It is only about 1,140 acres (460 hectares) in comparison to its larger neighbor, Big Pine Key, which lies about half a mile (800 m) to its west. It is accessible by a concrete bridge from Big Pine Key and was the terminus of a car ferry that existed before the present Overseas Highway was built on the remains of Flagler's Overseas Railroad.

== Electricity ==
No Name Key was known for not being connected to the commercial power grid, for a local county ordinance prohibited this. Residents mostly used a combination of solar energy and diesel or gas generators.

This prohibition of commercial electricity sparked a lawsuit between Monroe County and the No Name Key property owners. In May 2013, the Florida Public Service Commission exercised its jurisdiction over public utilities and issued Order PSC-13-0207-PAA-EM declaring the residents had a right to commercial electrical power. A week later, the circuit court issued a writ of mandamus ordering the county to issue the permits necessary to connect the residential homes to the commercial electric grid.

On May 29, 2013, the decades-long battle over electricity ended as the residents began connecting to the commercial electric grid.

== Flora and fauna ==
Native fauna of No Name Key include the endangered Key deer.
