= Denisophytum =

Scientific classification
- Kingdom: Plantae
- Clade: Tracheophytes
- Clade: Angiosperms
- Clade: Eudicots
- Clade: Rosids
- Order: Fabales
- Family: Fabaceae
- Subfamily: Caesalpinioideae
- Tribe: Caesalpinieae
- Genus: Denisophytum; R.Vig. (1948)

Type species
- Denisophytum madagascariense R. Vig. (1948)

Species
- 8; see text

Genus of legumes

Denisophytum is a genus of flowering plants in the family Fabaceae. It belongs to subfamily Caesalpinioideae and tribe Caesalpinieae. It includes eight species, which have a disjunct distribution – northern Mexico, Florida and the Caribbean, southern South America, the Horn of Africa, the Arabian Peninsula, and Madagascar.

== Species ==
Denisophytum comprises the following species:

- Denisophytum bessac (Chiov. 1929) Gagnon & G.P.Lewis 2016
- Denisophytum buchii (Urb. 1913) Gagnon & G.P.Lewis 2016
- Denisophytum eriantherum (Chiov. 1929) Gagnon & G.P.Lewis 2016
  - var. eriantherum (Chiov. 1929) Gagnon & G.P.Lewis 2016
  - var. pubescens (Brenan) Gagnon & G.P.Lewis
- Denisophytum madagascariense R.Vig 1949
- Denisophytum pauciflorum (Griseb. 1866) Gagnon & G.P.Lewis 2016—Fewflower holdback
- Denisophytum rosei (Urb. 1918) Gagnon & G.P.Lewis 2016
- Denisophytum sessilifolium (S.Watson 1886) Gagnon & G.P.Lewis 2016
- Denisophytum stuckertii (Hassl. 1913) Gagnon & G.P.Lewis 2016
