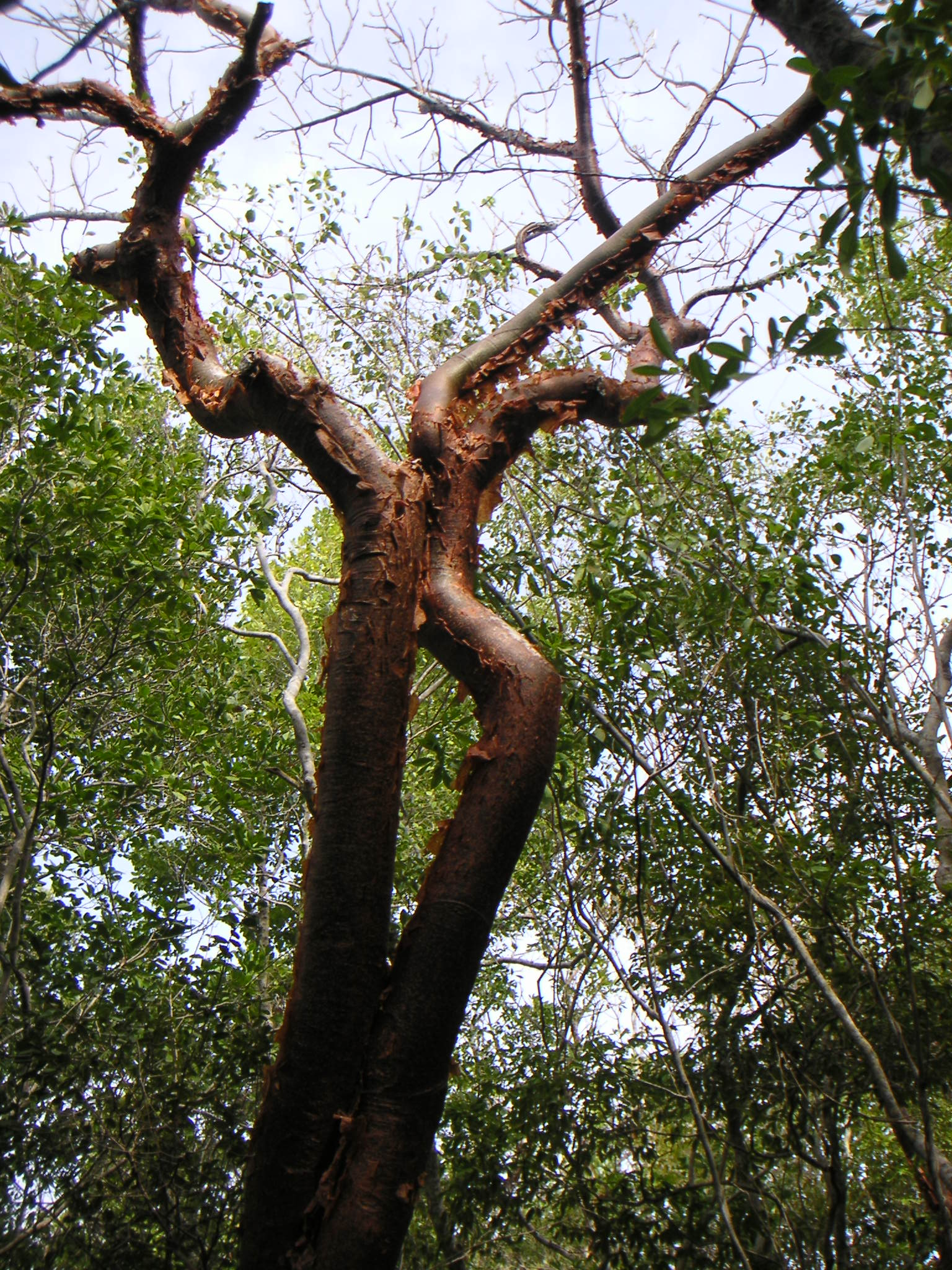
- Gumbo-limbo habitus

Conservation status
- Least Concern (IUCN 3.1)

Scientific classification
- Kingdom: Plantae
- Clade: Tracheophytes
- Clade: Angiosperms
- Clade: Eudicots
- Clade: Rosids
- Order: Sapindales
- Family: Burseraceae
- Genus: Bursera
- Species: B. simaruba

Binomial name
- Bursera simaruba (L.) Sarg. 1890

Synonyms
- List: Pistacia simaruba L. 1753; Elaphrium simaruba (L.) Rose; Bursera arborea (Rose) L.Riley; Bursera bonairensis Bold.; Bursera gummifera L.; Bursera gummifera var. glabrata Griseb.; Bursera gummifera var. polyphylla DC.; Bursera integerrima (Tul.) Triana & Planch.; Bursera simaruba var. yucatanensis Lundell; Bursera subpubescens (Rose) Engl.; Elaphrium arboreum (Rose) Rose; Elaphrium integerrimum Tul.; Elaphrium subpubescens Rose; Icicariba simaruba M.Gómez; Terebinthus arborea Rose; Terebinthus simaruba (L.) W.Wight ex Rose

= Bursera simaruba =

Species of flowering plant

Bursera simaruba, the gumbo-limbo, copperwood, tourist tree, turpentine tree, almácigo, or West Indian birch, is a tree species in the family Burseraceae. It is native to the Neotropics, from South Florida to Mexico and the Caribbean to Brazil, Nicaragua, and Venezuela. Bursera simaruba is prevalent in the Petenes mangroves ecoregion of the Yucatán, where it is a subdominant plant species to the mangroves. In the United States, specimens may be found along the regions adjacent to the Gulf of Mexico and extending down the western coast of Florida.

== Description ==
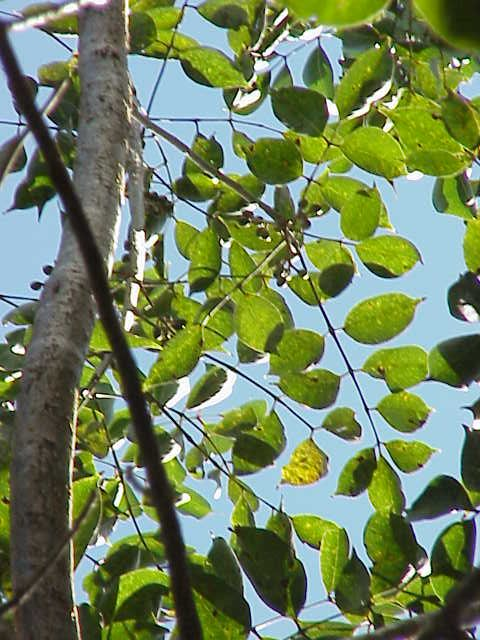
Leaves

Bursera simaruba is a small to medium-sized tree growing to 30 metres (98 ft) tall, with a diameter of one metre (3 ft 3 in) or less at 1.5 meters above ground. The bark is shiny dark red and the leaves are spirally arranged and pinnate with 7-11 leaflets, each leaflet broad ovate, 4–10 cm (1.6–3.9 in) long and 2–5 cm (0.79–1.97 in) broad. Gumbo-limbo is semi-evergreen, and some sources state it may be evergreen, depending upon location in the range and except for severe drought conditions, however generally retaining some foliage and rapidly recovering.

In Florida, the tree sometimes is known humorously by the common name the tourist tree because the tree's bark is red and peeling, resembling the skin of the sunburnt tourists who are a common sight in the plant range.

While the tree yields some ripe fruit year-round, the main fruiting season is March and April in the northern part of the range of the tree. The fruit is a small three-valved top-shaped capsule encasing a single seed that is covered in a red, fatty aril (seedcoat) of 5–6 mm diameter. Both ripe and unripe fruits are rather loosely attached at their stems and may detach spontaneously if the tree is shaken. Ripe capsules or dehisce are cracked open by birds. Birds will seek out the fruit to feed on the aril that, although it is relatively small, is rich in lipids (amounting to approximately half its dry weight).

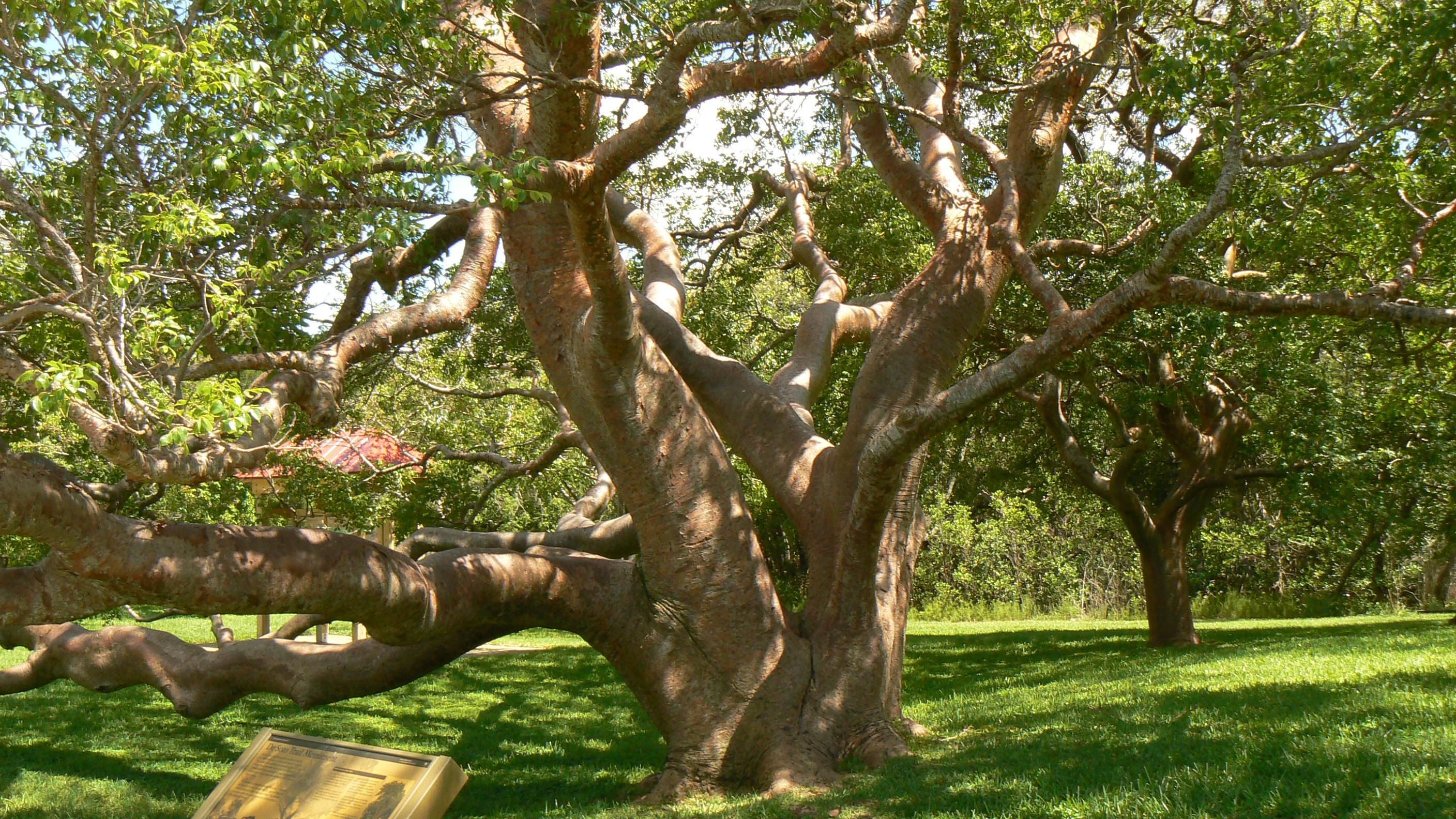
Gumbo-limbo tree at De Soto National Memorial, Manatee County, Florida

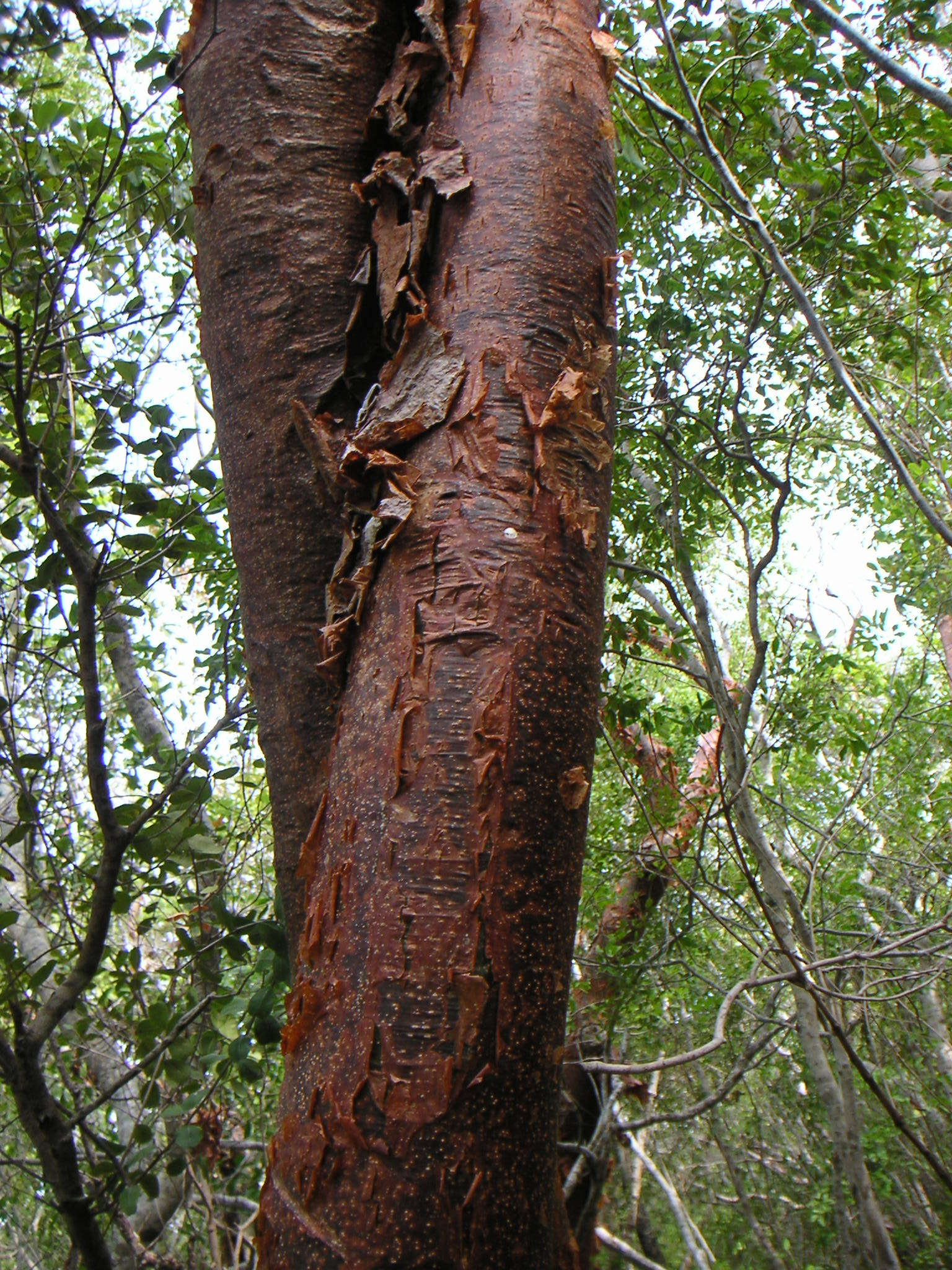
Bark of the gumbo-limbo tree

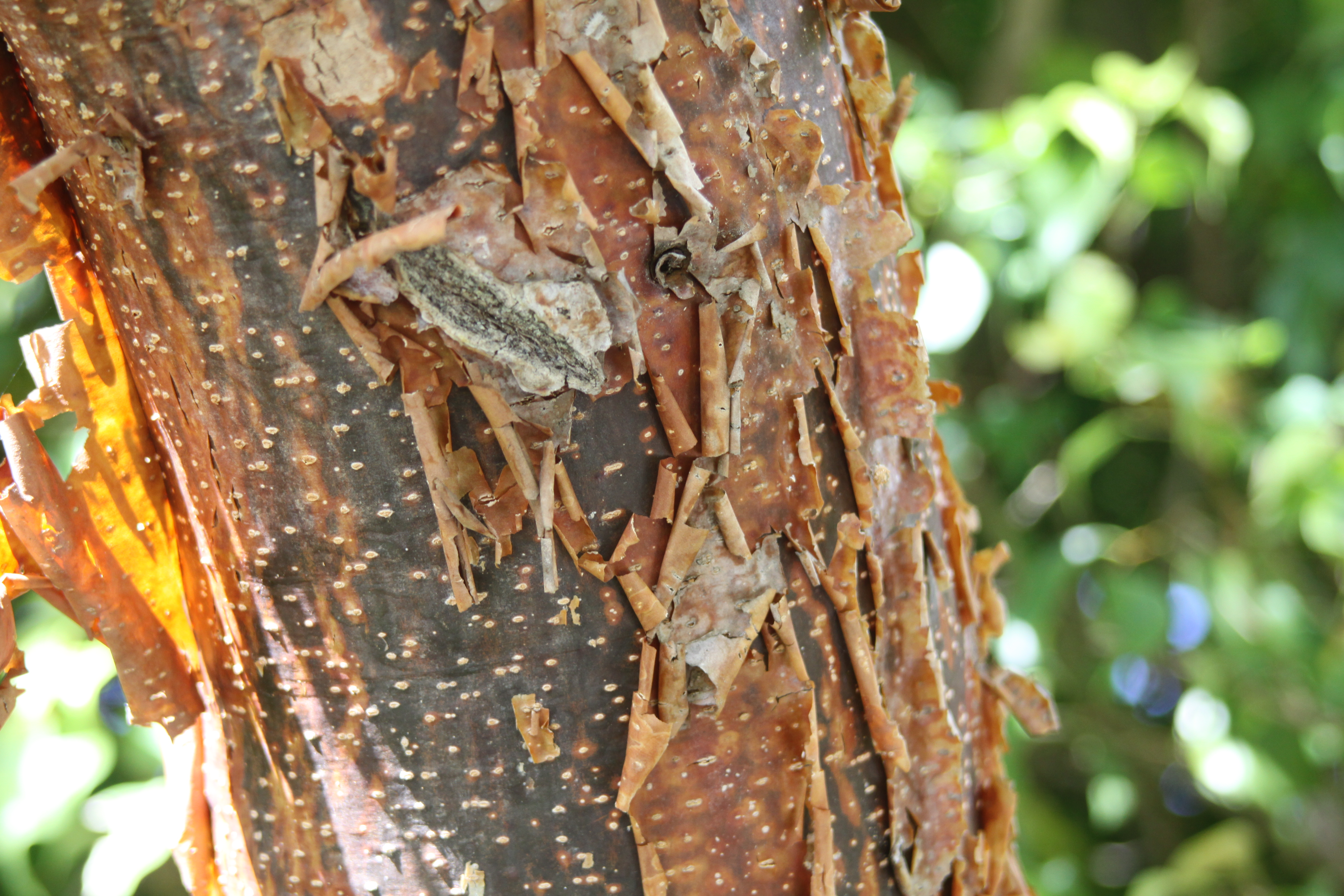
Bark of the gumbo-limbo tree in Duck Key, Florida

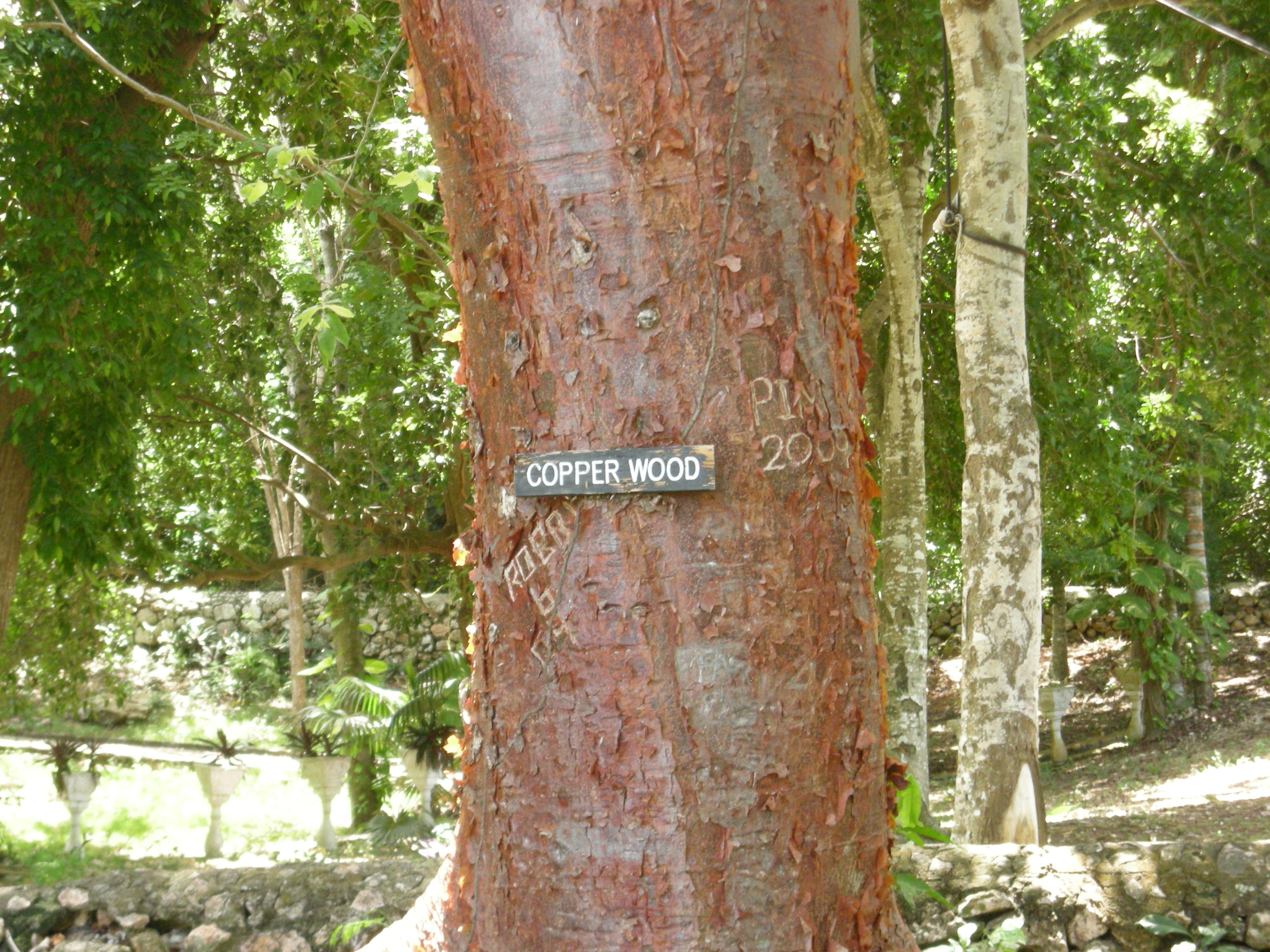
Gumbo-limbo, known as Copperwood in Jamaica, on the grounds of Rose Hall, Montego Bay, Jamaica

== Uses ==
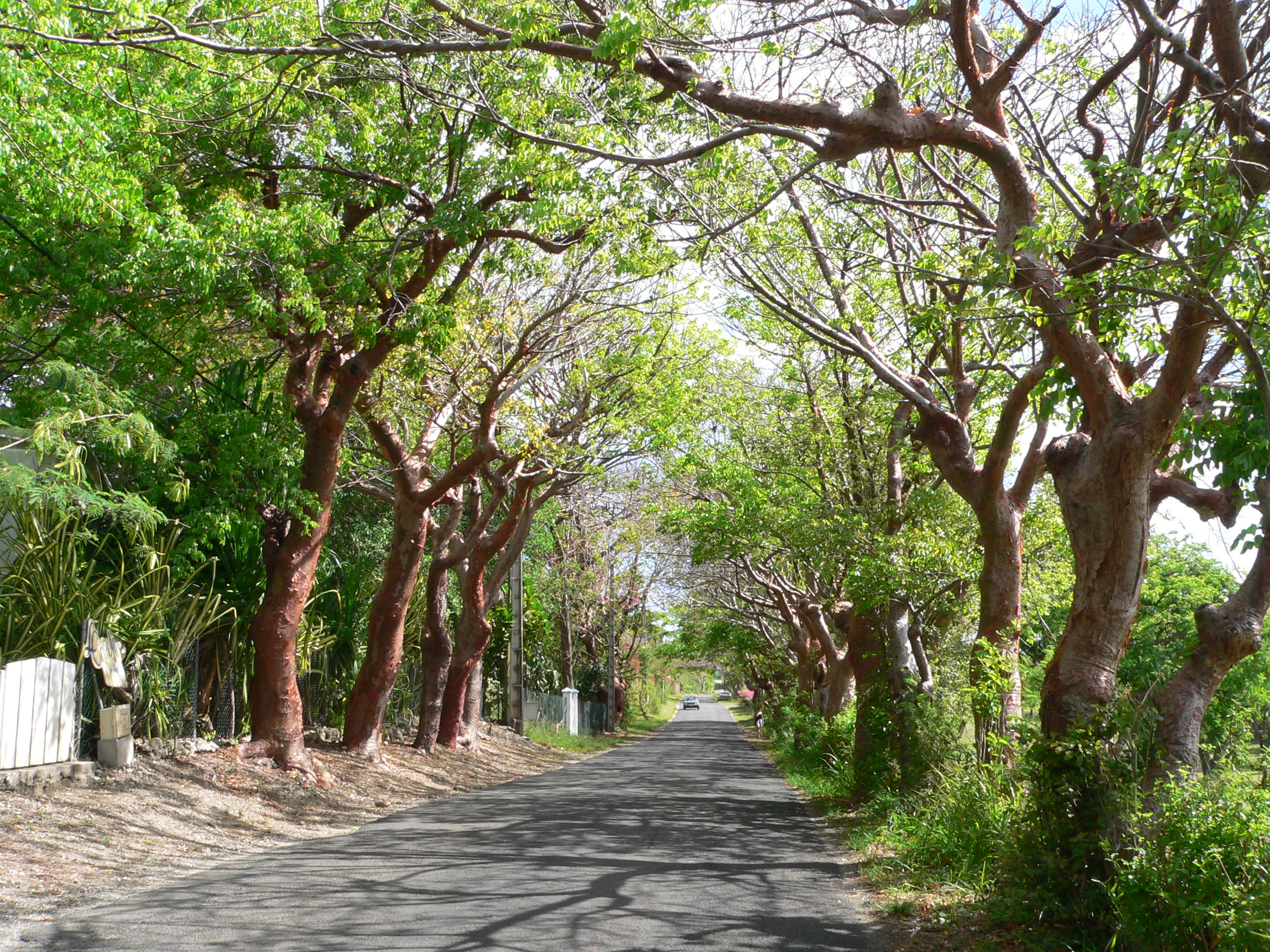
Guadelupe street planting of gumbo-limbo

Gumbo-limbo is a very useful plant economically and ecologically. It grows rapidly and is well adapted to several kinds of habitats that include salty and calcareous soils (however, it does not tolerate boggy soils). Gumbo-limbo also is considered one of the most wind-tolerant trees and it is recommended as a rugged, hurricane-resistant species in South Florida. They may be planted to serve as wind protection of crops and roads, or as live fence posts. If small branches are simply stuck into good soil, they will readily grow into sizable trees in a few years, but without a tap root, only producing side roots. Experience has demonstrated in Central America that using branch plantings for posts or wind protection is a questionable practice since those trees and fence posts are not so sturdy as a true, naturally occurring sapling being planted in a traditional manner. In Sarasota, Florida, gumbo-limbo trees have been used as street trees along a commercial portion of Boulevard of the Arts because the roots do not create problems for sidewalks and utilities.

Gumbo-limbo wood is suitable for light construction. It is rather brittle, although the trunk is used in Haiti to make drums. The resin of the tree, called chibou, cachibou, or gomartis, is used as glue, varnish, and incense, a frequent trait in other Burseraceae trees.

Gumbo-limbo's rapid growth, ease and low cost of propagation, and ecological versatility makes it highly recommended as a "starter" tree in reforestation, even of degraded habitat, and it performs much better overall in such a role than do most exotic species.

The arils produced by the tree are an important source of food for birds, including many winter migrants from North America. Local residents such as the masked tityra, bright-rumped attila, black-faced grosbeak, (and on Hispaniola, the palmchat), are particularly fond of gumbo-limbo fruit, as are migrants such as the Baltimore oriole or the dusky-capped flycatcher. When ripe fruit are abundant, it is an especially important local food source for vireos, such as the red-eyed vireo. Many migrant species will use gumbo-limbo trees that are in human-modified habitat, even in settlements. This creates the opportunity to attract such species to residential areas for bird watching, and to reduce the competition for gumbo-limbo seeds in undisturbed habitats that rarer local resident birds might face. Given the eagerness with which some birds seek out the arils, it may be that they contain lipids or other compounds useful to humans. In order for these to be exploited commercially, however, they probably would have to be synthetically produced, because although the crop of a single tree may be very large (up to or even exceeding 15,000 fruits, translating into a raw lipid yield of more than 200 grams per harvest), individual seeds are small and cumbersome to harvest.

The resin is used as a treatment for gout. The leaves are brewed into a medicinal tea. Hexane extracts from the leaves have been shown to possess anti-inflammatory properties in animal tests. Gumbo-limbo bark is an antidote to an extreme rash caused by Metopium brownei (also known as chechém tree) that may be compared to that of the related poison ivy that often grows in the same habitat.

== Folklore on origin ==
In Yucatec Maya oral tradition, the origins of the "chaka tree" (Bursera simaruba, the gumbo-limbo) and the "chechém tree" (Metopium brownei) are related in the legend of two brothers, Kinch and Tizic.

The brothers embody opposing natures, one gentle and one wrathful. Both fell in love with the same woman, Nicté-Ha. Their bitter rivalry in competition for the woman culminated in a fatal battle between them where they died in each other's arms. With their final breaths, they begged the deities to let them see Nicté-Ha one more time. In answer, the deities transformed the brothers into adjacent trees—the poisonous chechém representing the violent brother and the medicinal chaka representing the peaceful one—and because of the similarly-shaped flowers of the trees that were thought to be the same, Nicté-Ha became bound forever to both brothers in the legend.
