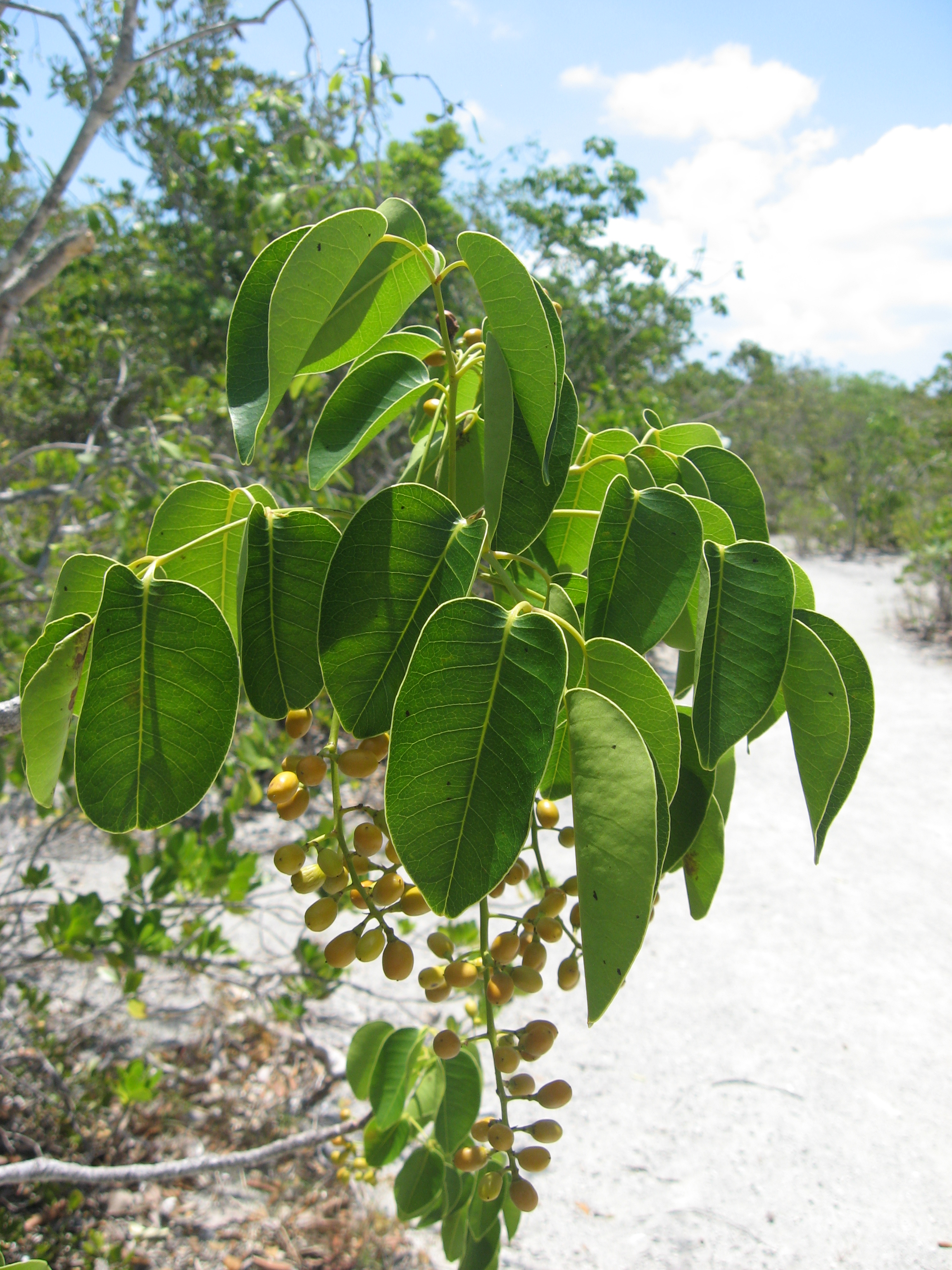

Conservation status
- Least Concern (IUCN 3.1)

- Apparently Secure (NatureServe)

Scientific classification
- Kingdom: Plantae
- Clade: Tracheophytes
- Clade: Angiosperms
- Clade: Eudicots
- Clade: Rosids
- Order: Sapindales
- Family: Anacardiaceae
- Genus: Metopium
- Species: M. toxiferum

Binomial name
- Metopium toxiferum (L.) Krug & Urb., 1896

Synonyms
- Amyris toxiferum L.

= Metopium toxiferum =

Species of tree

Metopium toxiferum, the poisonwood, Florida poisontree, coral sumac, or hog gum, is a species of flowering tree in the cashew or sumac family, Anacardiaceae, that is native to the American Neotropics. It produces the irritant urushiol much like its close relatives poison sumac and poison oak. It is related to black poisonwood (Metopium brownei).

== Distribution and habitat ==
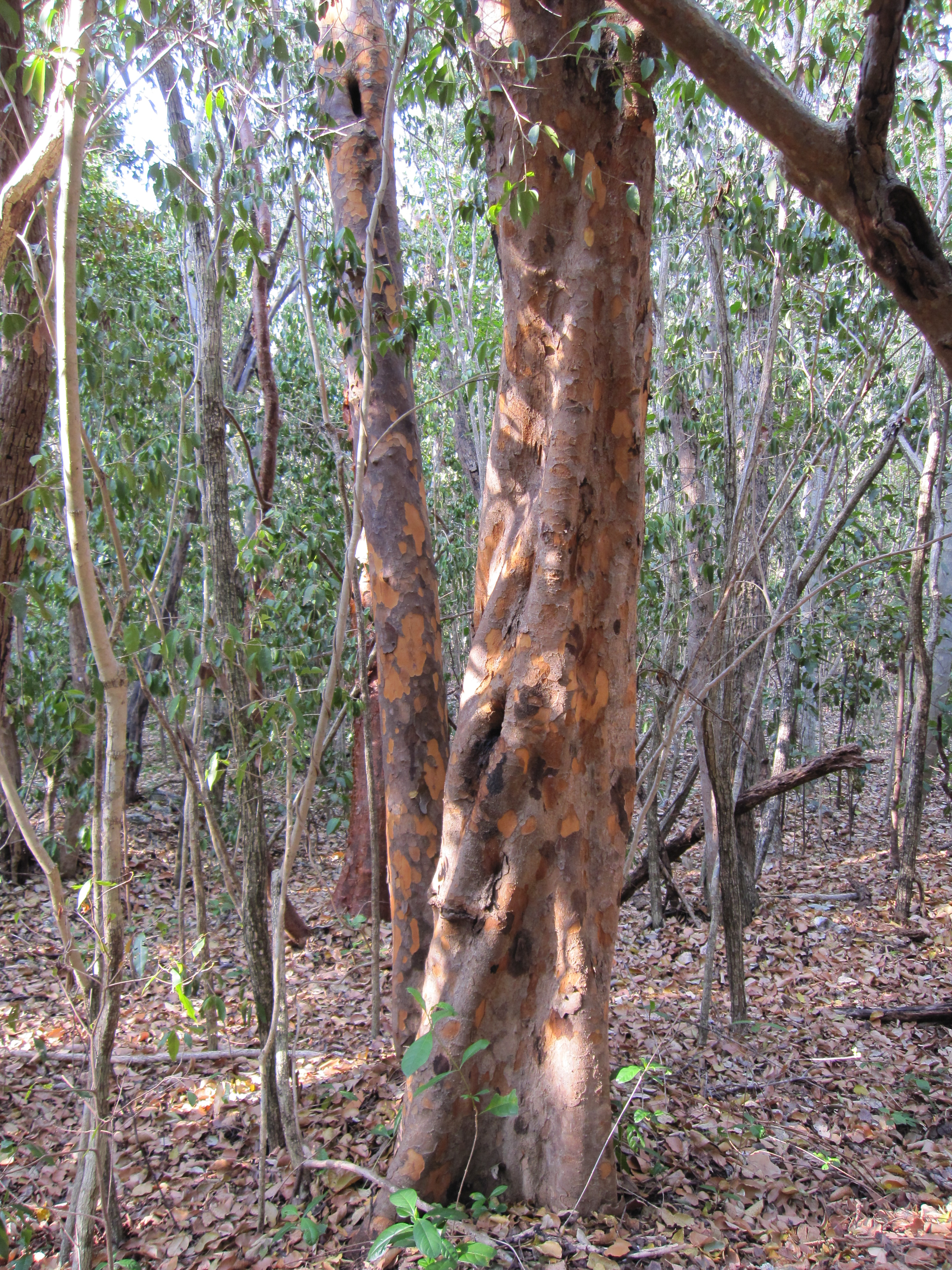
Log of the tree

This tree grows abundantly in the Florida Keys and can also be found in various ecosystems in southern Florida. Its range extends from Florida and The Bahamas south through the Caribbean.
