= Big Pine Key, Florida =

- Census-designated place
- Location in Monroe County and the state of Florida

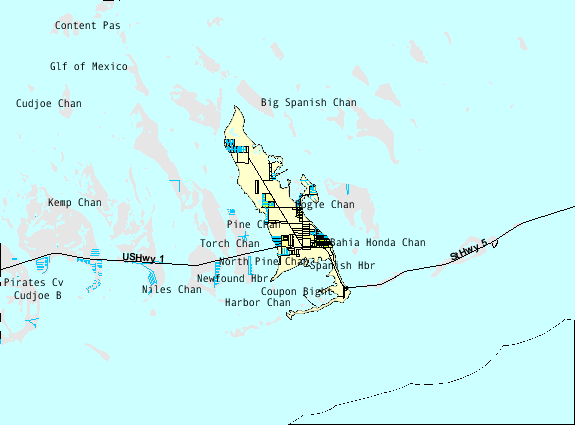
- U.S. Census Bureau map showing CDP boundaries
- Coordinates: 24°41′55″N 81°22′45″W
- Country: United States
- State: Florida
- County: Monroe

Area
  - Total: 10.31 sq mi (26.70 km^{2})
  - Land: 10.20 sq mi (26.43 km^{2})
  - Water: 0.11 sq mi (0.28 km^{2})
- Elevation: 0 ft (0 m)

Population (2020)
  - Total: 4,521
  - Density: 443.1/sq mi (171.07/km^{2})
- Time zone: UTC-5 (Eastern (EST))
  - Summer (DST): UTC-4 (EDT)
- ZIP code: 33043
- Area code: 305
- FIPS code: 12-06425
- GNIS feature ID: 2402688

Big Pine Key is a census-designated place and unincorporated community in Monroe County, Florida, United States, on an island of the same name in the Florida Keys. As of the 2020 census, the town had a total population of 4,521.

== Geography ==
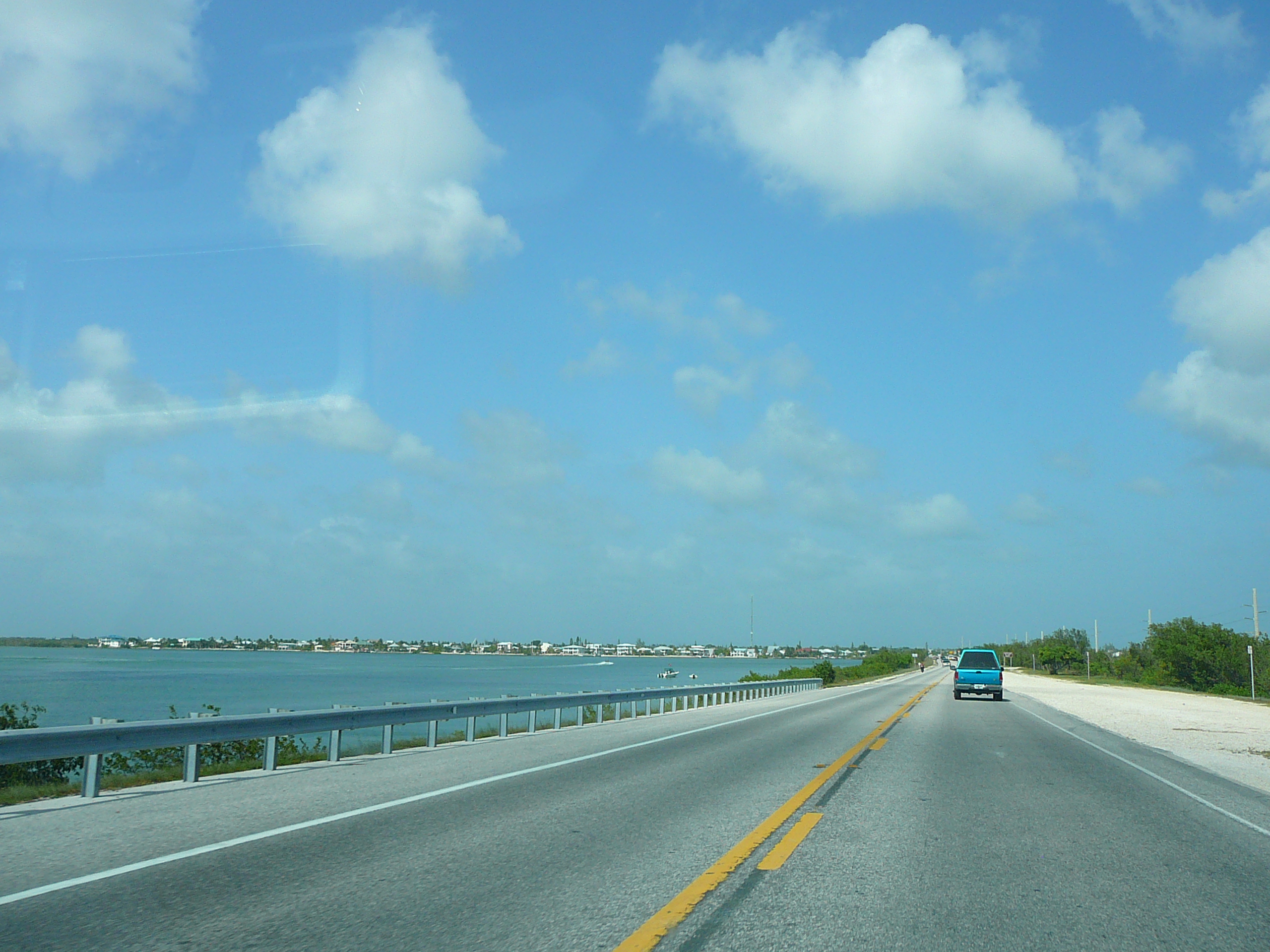
View of west side of the island from the Overseas Highway

U.S. 1 (the Overseas Highway) crosses the key at mile markers 29.5–33, one of the few places on the keys where the road orients north–south (along the eastern edge of the Key). The highway leads west-southwest 29 miles (47 km) to Key West and east-northeast 21 miles (34 km) to Marathon.

Big Pine Key was the location of one of the stations of the Overseas Railroad.

According to the United States Census Bureau, the CDP has a total area of 10.3 square miles (27 km^{2}), of which 0.1 square miles (0.3 km^{2}), or 1.04%, is covered by water.

== Demographics ==
Historical population
Census	Pop.	Note	%±
1980	2,350		—
1990	4,206		79.0%
2000	5,032		19.6%
2010	4,252		−15.5%
2020	4,521		6.3%
U.S. Decennial Census

=== 2020 census ===
As of the 2020 census, Big Pine Key had a population of 4,521. There were 2,099 households and 1,180 families residing in the CDP. The median age was 54.4 years. 12.7% of residents were under the age of 18 and 27.2% were 65 years of age or older. For every 100 females, there were 107.4 males, and for every 100 females age 18 and over, there were 107.9 males.

82.5% of residents lived in urban areas, while 17.5% lived in rural areas.

Of the 2,099 households, 17.5% had children under the age of 18 living in them. 49.0% were married-couple households, 21.7% were households with a male householder and no spouse or partner present, and 18.2% were households with a female householder and no spouse or partner present. About 27.3% of all households were made up of individuals, and 14.1% had someone living alone who was 65 years of age or older.

There were 3,037 housing units, of which 30.9% were vacant. The homeowner vacancy rate was 3.4% and the rental vacancy rate was 22.4%.

Big Pine Key racial composition
Race	Number	Percentage
White (non-Hispanic)	3,612	79.89%
Black or African American (non-Hispanic)	49	1.08%
Native American	9	0.2%
Asian	46	1.02%
Pacific Islander	2	0.04%
Other/Mixed	182	4.03%
Hispanic or Latino	621	13.74%

=== 2000 census ===
As of the census of 2000, 5,032 people, 2,247 households, and 1,420 families resided in the CDP. The population density was 198.9/km^{2} (515.3/mi^{2}). The 3,153 housing units averaged 124.6/km^{2} (322.9/mi^{2}). The racial makeup of the CDP was 94.83% White, 1.09% African American, 0.50% Native American, 0.58% Asian, 0.02% Pacific Islander, 1.19% from other races, and 1.79% from two or more races. Hispanics or Latinos of any race were 6.72% of the population.

Of the 2,247 households, 41.4% had children under the age of 18 living with them, 43.8% were married couples living together, 5.7% had a female householder with no husband present, and 6.8% were not families. About 26.0% of all households were made up of individuals, and 7.8% had someone living alone who was 65 years of age or older. The average household size was 2.21 and the average family size was 2.63.

In the CDP, the population was distributed as 16.8% under the age of 18, 4.3% from 18 to 24, 30.3% from 25 to 44, 33.7% from 45 to 64, and 14.9% who were 65 years of age or older. The median age was 44 years. For every 100 females, there were 110.4 males. For every 100 females age 18 and over, there were 111.6 males.

The median income for a household in the CDP was $44,514, and for a family was $47,639. Males had a median income of $31,552 versus $28,021 for females. The per capita income for the CDP was $23,169. About 5.6% of families and 9.5% of the population were below the poverty line, including 17.4% of those under age 18 and 7.0% of those aged 65 or over.

== The Blue Hole ==
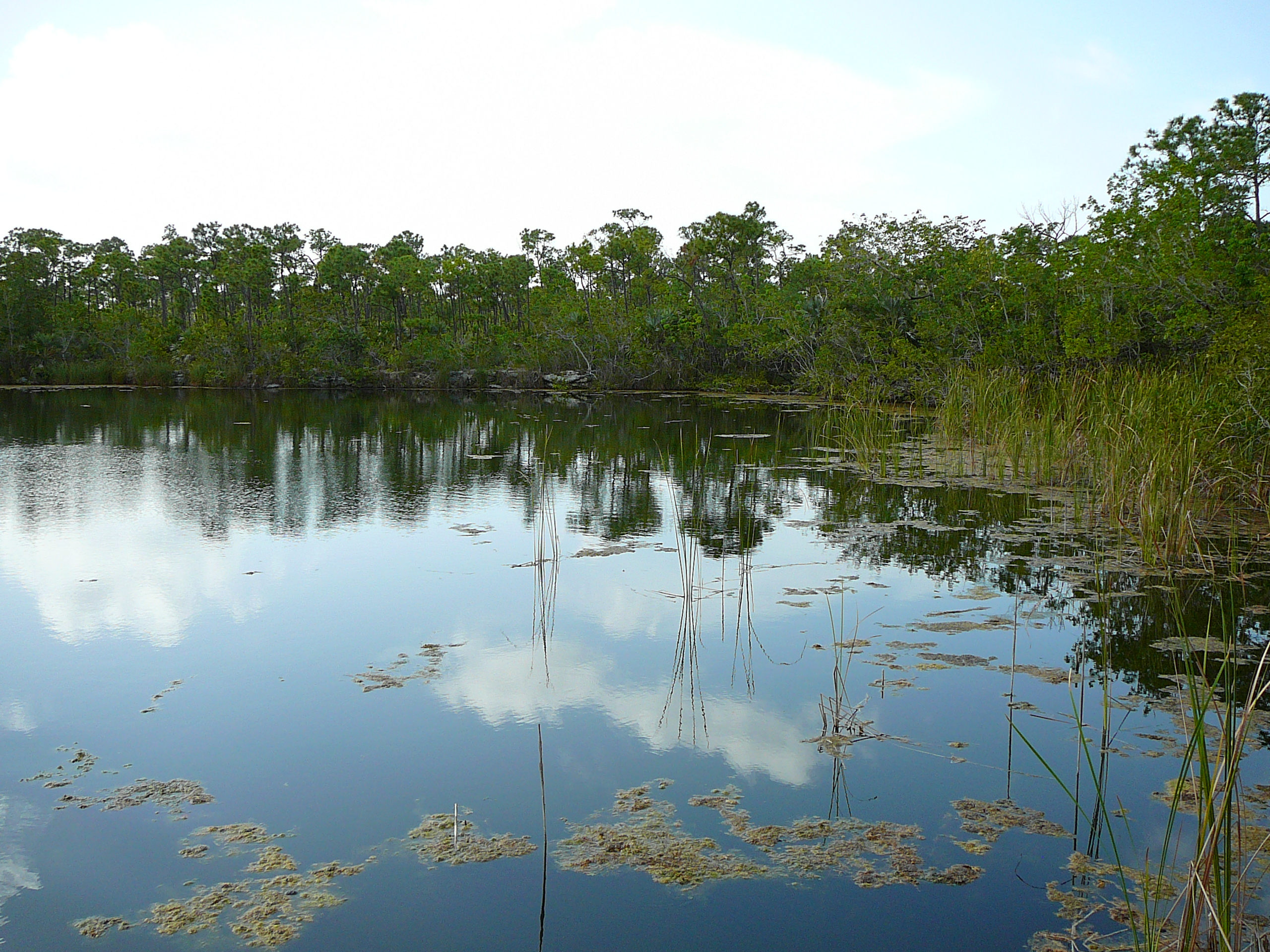
The Blue Hole is the only freshwater lake in the Florida Keys.

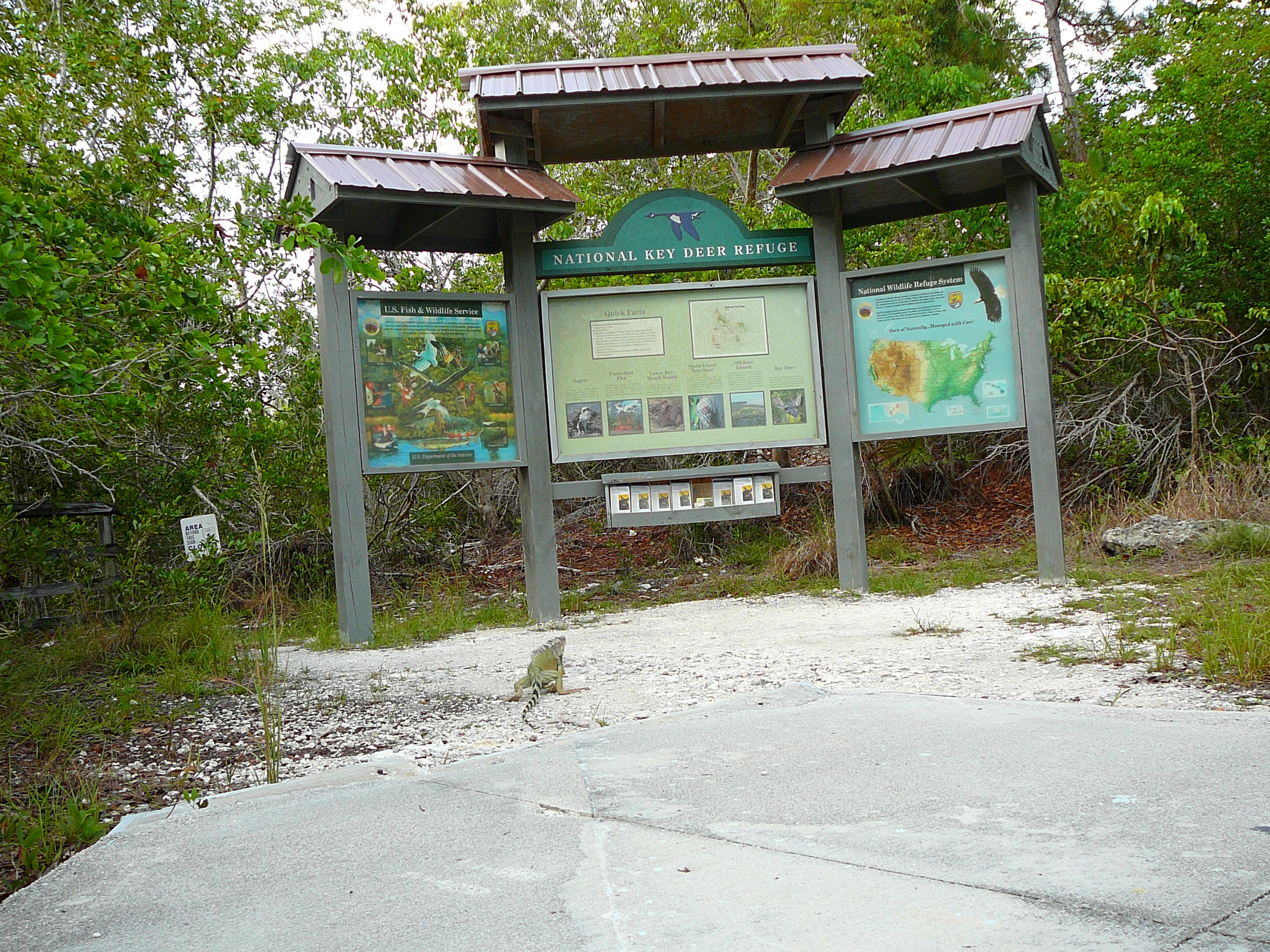
A green iguana in front of the Blue Hole sign

The Blue Hole is an abandoned rock quarry that was used for nearby road fills and Henry Flagler's Overseas Railroad. The water it contains is mostly fresh and is used by various wildlife in the area, such as birds, snakes, alligators and invasive green iguanas. It is part of the National Key Deer Refuge.

== Business and commerce ==
The primary grocery store is located in a shopping center just north of US 1. This shopping center contains several restaurants, an outlet store, electronics store, the visitor center for the National Key Deer Refuge, and a branch of the Monroe County Library (with WiFi internet access). Pharmacies are located along US 1, as well as a shoe store, a tropical decor store, and a bait and tackle shop. A small hardware store in the same area sells typical paint, hardware, tools, other goods needed to build/repair items around the home, and a limited selection of parts for boat repair.

Several bars and restaurants are along the US 1 corridor. The nearest city of note is Marathon about 23 miles (37 km) "north" on US 1. Key West, a major shopping and cultural hub for the area, is about 30 miles (48 km) "south" on US 1.

Accommodation is limited, though RV/camping and a small number of motel-style units are available on the far southeast side of the island.

== Key deer ==
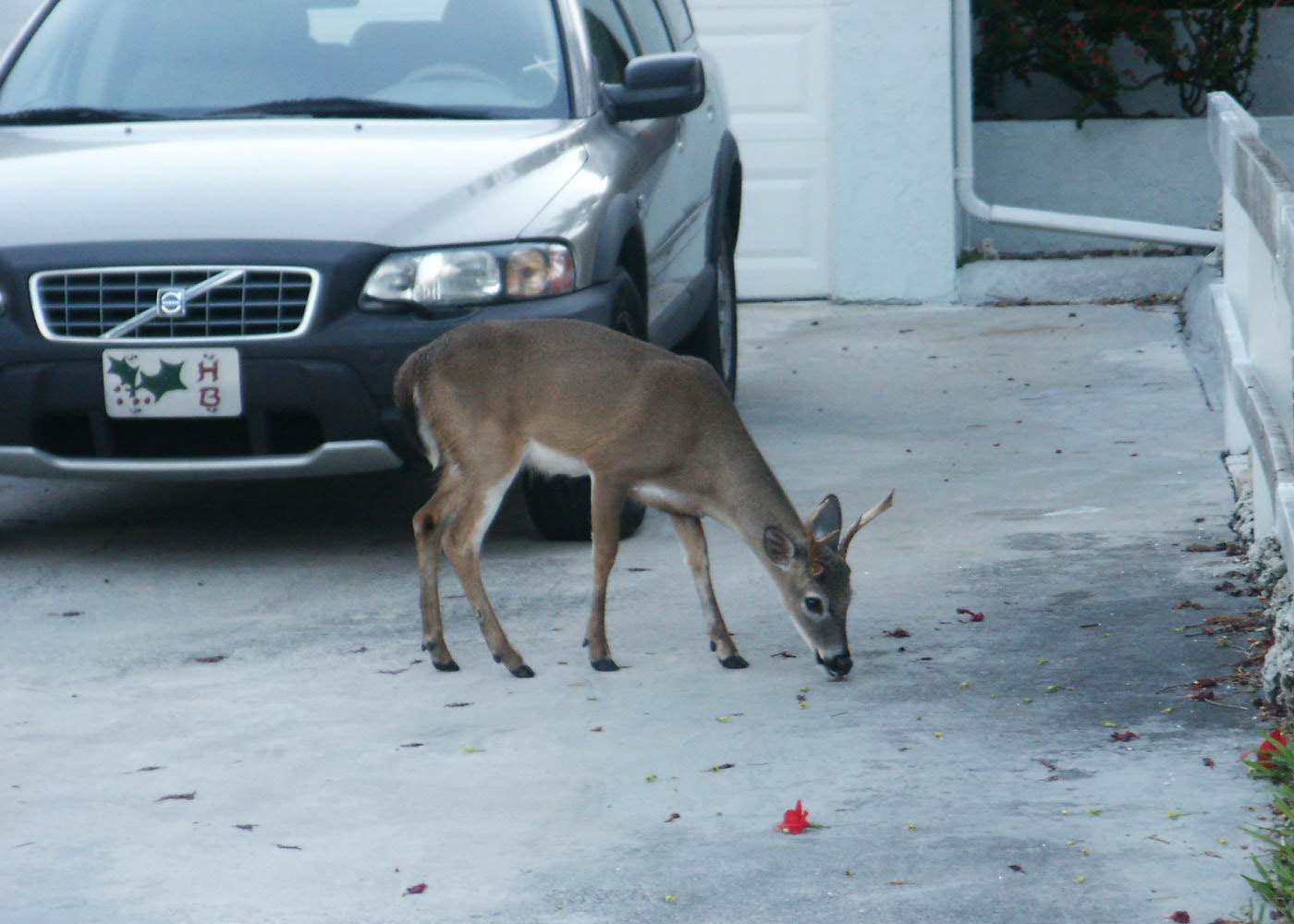
Key deer (buck)

The island of Big Pine Key is home to the National Key Deer Refuge. The majority of the Key deer population are found on this island.

The Key deer is the smallest subspecies of white-tailed deer. The largest bucks are less than a yard high at the shoulders and weigh approximately 80 pounds. The does are 24 to 28 inches at the shoulders and weigh approximately 65 pounds. They have many habitats in the Florida Keys including pine rocklands, hardwood hammocks, mangroves, and freshwater wetlands. Key deer are only found from Big Pine Key to Sugarloaf Key.

As Key deer are endangered, many precautions have been taken to preserve as much Key deer habitat as possible:

- Signs are prominently placed along US 1 to inform drivers that they are entering Key deer habitat, and warning them that feeding Key deer is prohibited.
- About 2 miles of US 1 on the eastern end of Big Pine Key are elevated and fenced off to allow Key deer to pass under the road.
- The stretch of US 1 in Big Pine Key has a night-time speed limit of 35 miles per hour (as Key deer are most active at night) and the speed limits (45 MPH in the day) are "strictly enforced" according to signage.
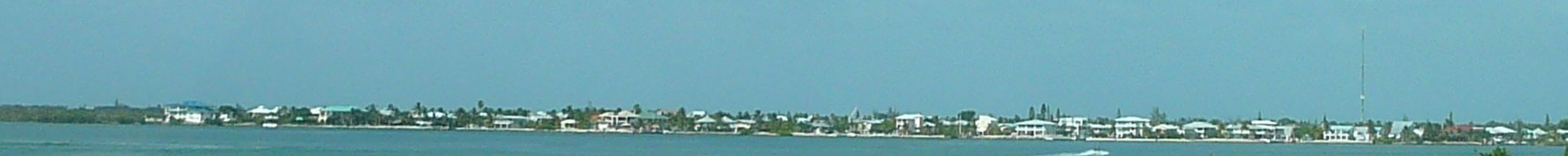
View of a portion of the west side of the island as seen from the Overseas Highway.
