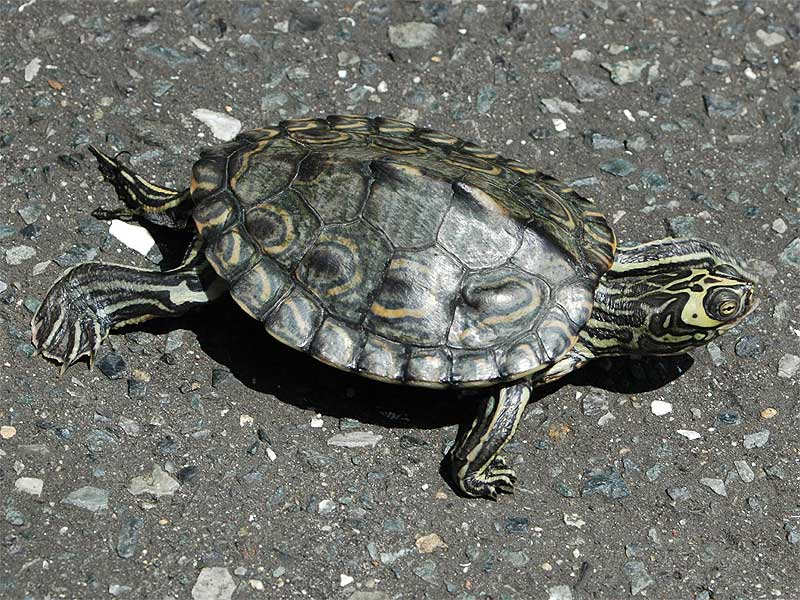
- Graptemys barbouri, hatchling

Conservation status
- Near Threatened (IUCN 3.1)
- CITES Appendix II

Scientific classification
- Kingdom: Animalia
- Phylum: Chordata
- Class: Reptilia
- Order: Testudines
- Suborder: Cryptodira
- Family: Emydidae
- Genus: Graptemys
- Species: G. barbouri

Binomial name
- Graptemys barbouri Carr & Marchand, 1942
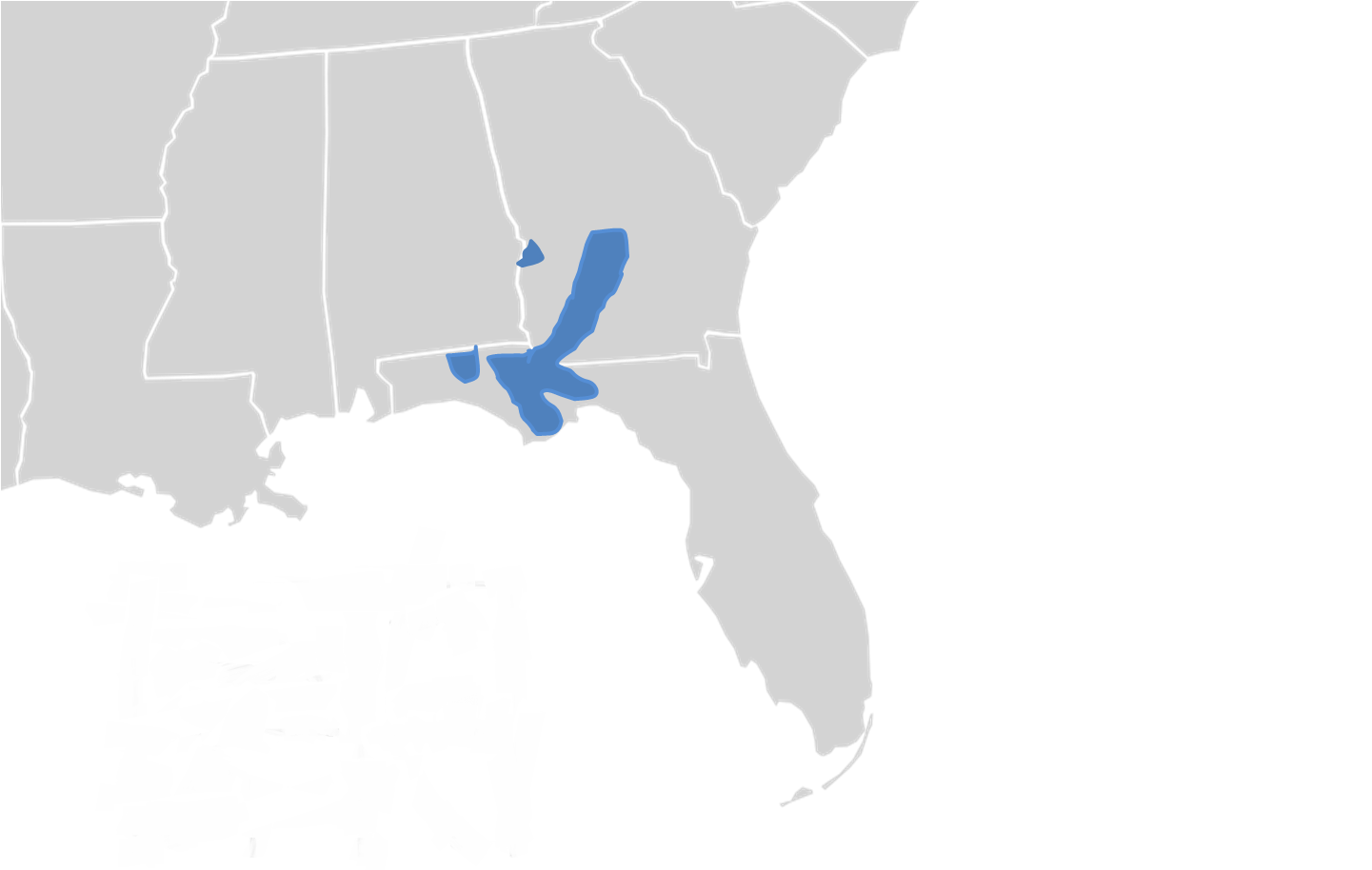
- Range map

Synonyms
- Graptemys barbouri Carr & Marchand, 1942; Malaclemys barbouri — McDowell, 1964; Graptemys barbouri — Conant, 1975

= Barbour's map turtle =

Species of turtle

Barbour's map turtle (Graptemys barbouri) is a species of turtle in the family Emydidae. The species is native to the southeastern United States.

== Geographic range ==
G. barbouri is found in rivers located in southeastern Alabama, the western panhandle of Florida, and southwestern Georgia.

== Habitat Preference ==
G. barbouri have been shown to prefer areas in deeper water, close to rocky areas with large amounts of woody debris.

== Etymology ==
The specific name or epithet, barbouri, is in honor of American herpetologist Thomas Barbour.

== Ownership ==
Owning Barbour's map turtle is illegal in Georgia, Michigan, and Alabama. The limit is two turtles per person in Florida. Like all map turtles, it is under the protection of the Salmonellosis Four-inch Regulation, disallowing G. barbouri to be sold if it is under the length of 4 in (10 cm).

== Description ==
Adult male Barbour's map turtles are on average 3.5 to 5.5 in (8.9 to 14.0 cm) in straight-line carapace length. Adult females are much larger and can vary from 6 to 12.5 in (15 to 32 cm) in straight-line carapace length. "Females attain really imposing dimensions, and their heads are enormously enlarged". G. barbouri possesses black-tipped spines on the second, third, and fourth vertebral scutes. These spines are very noticeable in males, and resemble a dorsal fin.

== Diet ==
Barbour's map turtle mainly consumes mollusks, insects, and small fish found in rivers.

== Predation ==
Humans sometimes eat Barbour's map turtles as food. The nests of Barbour's map turtles are subject to predation by snakes and terrestrial mammals, such as raccoons.

In Florida, Barbour’s map turtles may be eaten by some growth stage of invasive snakes like Burmese pythons, reticulated pythons, Southern African rock pythons, Central African rock pythons, boa constrictors, yellow anacondas, Bolivian anacondas, dark-spotted anacondas, and green anacondas.
