= List of largest snakes =

The largest living snakes in the world, measured either by length or by weight, are various members of the Boidae and Pythonidae families. They include anacondas, pythons and boa constrictors, which are all non-venomous constrictors. The longest venomous snake, with a length up to 18.5–18.8 ft (5.6–5.7 m), is the king cobra, while contesters for the heaviest title include the Gaboon viper and the Eastern diamondback rattlesnake. All of these three species reach a maximum mass in the range of 6–20 kg (13–44 lb). The largest known snake overall is the extinct Titanoboa.

There are fourteen or fifteen living snake species that have a maximum mass of at least 50 lb (23 kg), as shown in the table below. These include all species that reach a length of at least 20 ft (6 m). There are also two other species that reach nearly this length – the Oenpelli python (binomial name Nyctophilopython oenpelliensis, Simalia oenpelliensis or Morelia oenpelliensis), and the olive python (Liasis olivaceus). The information available about these two species is rather limited. The Oenpelli python, in particular, has been called the rarest python in the world.

There is considerable variation in the maximum reported size of these species, and most measurements are not verifiable, so the sizes listed should not be considered definitive. In general, the reported lengths are likely to be somewhat overestimated. In spite of what has been, for many years, a standing offer of a large financial reward (initially $1,000 offered by U.S. President Theodore Roosevelt in the early 1900s, later raised to $5,000, then $15,000 in 1978 and $50,000 in 1980) for a live, healthy snake over 30 ft (9.14 m) long by the New York Zoological Society (later renamed as the Wildlife Conservation Society), no attempt to claim the reward has ever been made.

Although it is generally accepted that the reticulated python is the world's longest snake, most length estimates longer than 6 m (20 ft) have been called into question. It has been suggested that confident length records for the largest snakes must be established from a dead body soon after death, or alternatively from a heavily sedated snake, using a steel tape and in the presence of witnesses, and must be published (and preferably recorded on video). At least one reticulated python was measured under full anesthesia at 6.95 m (22.8 ft), and somewhat less reliable scientific reports up to 10.05 m (33.0 ft) have appeared.

Although weight is easier to measure reliably than length (e.g., by simply measuring the weight of a container with and without the snake inside it and subtracting one measurement from the other), a significant factor in the weight of a snake is whether it has been kept in captivity and provided an unusual abundance of food in conditions that also cause reduced levels of activity. Moreover, the weight of wild specimens is often reduced as a symptom of parasite infestations that are eliminated by veterinary care in captivity. Thus, the largest weights measured for captive specimens often greatly exceed the largest weights observed in the wild for the same species. This phenomenon may particularly affect the weight measurements for anaconda species that are especially difficult to keep in captivity due to their semi-aquatic nature, resulting in other species having larger weights measured in captivity. In particular, the green anaconda (Eunectes murinus) is an especially massive snake if only observations in the wild are considered.

== Largest serpent species in the world ==
Rank	Common name	Scientific name	Family	Mass	Image	Length	Range map
1	Green anaconda (a.k.a. giant anaconda)	Eunectes murinus	Boidae	May exceed 227 kg (500 lb), measurement validity questionable 170 kg (370 lb), unverified but plausible weight for wild-caught specimen in Acre, Brazil, see section on remarkable individual specimens 130 kg (290 lb) to 147 kg (324 lb), not firmly verified, specimen kept at Reptilarium du Larzac in Sainte-Eulalie-de-Cernon, France; 97.5 kg (215 lb), reliable, maximum among 780 specimens caught over a seven-year period 1992–98; Average 30.8 kg (68 lb) among 45 specimens (1992–98); Generally considered the heaviest in the wild (exceeded by P.bivittatus and M. reticulatus in captivity) Some specimens may be of a distinct "northern green anaconda" species.		May exceed 8.8 m (28 ft 10 in), not firmly verified 6.32 m (20 ft 9 in), reliable for specimen listed by Rivas et al. 6.27 m (20 ft 7 in), somewhat reliable 5.6 m (18 ft 4 in), somewhat reliable 5.21 m (17 ft 1 in), reliable, maximum among 780 specimens caught over a seven-year period 1992–98; Average 3.7 m (12 ft 2 in) among 45 specimens (1992–98); Minimum adult length 3.2 m (10 ft 6 in) Some specimens may be of a distinct "northern green anaconda" species.	
2	Burmese python	Python bivittatus (now recognized as distinct from P. molurus)	Pythonidae	182.8 kg (403 lb), reliable, for "Baby" in 1998 (in captivity); 98 kg (216 lb), reliable, for the heaviest specimen found in the wild 94 kg (207 lb), reliable, for the biggest male in the wild		5.7912 m (19 ft 0 in), reliable, for the longest specimen found in the wild 10 July 2023; Minimum adult length 2.35 m (7 ft 9 in)	
3	Reticulated python	Malayopython reticulatus	Pythonidae	Up to 158 kg (350 lb), somewhat reliable 158.8 kg (350 lb), somewhat reliable, for "Medusa" in 2011; About 156 kg (344 lb), somewhat reliable, for "Twinkie" in 2014; 136 kg (300 lb), somewhat reliable, for "Fluffy" in 2010; 133.7 kg (295 lb), reasonably reliable, for "Colossus" in 1954 (with an empty stomach); 124.7 kg (275 lb), somewhat reliable, for "Samantha" in 2002; 115 kg (254 lb), somewhat reliable, for "Super Snake" in 2021; 59 kg (130 lb), reliable, wild specimen in 1999 (after not eating for nearly 3 months)		10.05 m (33 ft 0 in), not firmly verified 7.92 m (26 ft 0 in), somewhat reliable, for "Samantha" in 2002; 7.67 m (25 ft 2 in), somewhat reliable, for "Medusa" in 2011; 7.3 m (23 ft 11 in), somewhat reliable, for "Fluffy" in 2010; 7 m (23 ft 0 in), somewhat reliable, for "Twinkie" in 2014; 7 m (23 ft 0 in), somewhat reliable, for "Super Snake" in 2021; 6.95 m (22 ft 10 in), reliable, wild specimen in 1999; 6.35 m (20 ft 10 in), reasonably reliable, for "Colossus" in 1963 (skeletal length); Specimens longer than 6 m (19 ft 8 in) are rare Minimum adult length 3.04 m (10 ft 0 in); Generally considered the world's longest	
4	Central African rock python	Python sebae (now recognized as distinct from P. natalensis)	Pythonidae	Up to 113 kg (250 lb), not firmly verified 91 kg (200 lb), reliable		Up to 7.5 m (24 ft 7 in), not firmly verified 6.5 m (21 ft 4 in), reliable Minimum adult length 2.50 m (8 ft 2 in)	Range shown as green region
5	Southern African rock python	Python natalensis (now recognized as distinct from P. sebae)	Pythonidae	80 kg (180 lb), somewhat reliable, for the largest specimen 65 kg (143 lb), reliable Of 75 specimens measured in South Africa, the longest female weighed 53.4 kg (118 lb).		6 m (19 ft 8 in) not firmly verified 5.8 m (19 ft 0 in), reliable Of 75 specimens measured in South Africa, the longest female was 4.34 m (14 ft 3 in) long. Specimens longer than 4.6 m (15 ft 1 in) are rare. Typically 2.8–4 m (9 ft 2 in – 13 ft 1 in)	Range shown as orange region
6	Indian python	Python molurus (now recognized as distinct from P. bivittatus)	Pythonidae	91 kg (200 lb), not firmly verified 52 kg (115 lb), reliable		6.4 m (21 ft 0 in), not firmly verified 4.6 m (15.1 ft), reliable	
7	Australian scrub python	Simalia kinghorni (now recognized as distinct from S. amethistina)	Pythonidae	35 kg (77 lb), reliable 24 kg (53 lb), reliable		Some reports up to or exceeding 8 m (26 ft 3 in), not firmly verified 7.2 m (23 ft 7 in), not firmly verified In excess of 6 m (19 ft 8 in); 5.65 m (18 ft 6 in), reliable Typically 3.5 m (11 ft 6 in); Minimum adult length 1.8 m (5 ft 11 in); Little information about size is available	Range shown as dark green region
8	Amethystine python	Simalia amethistina (recently recognized as distinct from S. kinghorni)	Pythonidae	Able to reach 20 kg (44 lb), and probably larger Little information about size is available		Able to reach 5.5 m (18 ft 1 in); 4.72 m (15 ft 6 in), reliable Little information about size is available	Range shown as dark orange and bright orange regions
9	Yellow anaconda	Eunectes notaeus	Boidae	They commonly weigh 25–35 kg (55–77 lb), though large specimens can weigh 40–55 kg (88–121 lb) or even more.		4.6 m (15.1 ft), reasonably reliable Typically 3–4 m (9 ft 10 in – 13 ft 1 in); 3.1 m (10 ft 2 in) maximum among 86 specimens in a field study	South America
10	Red tailed boa	Boa constrictor	Boidae	More than 45 kg (99 lb)		Possibly up to 4.3 m (14 ft 1 in); A much larger report was debunked	
11	Cuban boa	Chilabothrus angulifer	Boidae	Maximum 40 kg (88 lb), reliable 27 kg (60 lb), reliable		5.65 m (18 ft 6 in), for the largest specimen Up to 4.8 m (15 ft 9 in)	
12	Beni anaconda	Eunectes beniensis (now recognized as distinct from E. murinus and E. notaeus)	Boidae	35 kg (77 lb)		Largest specimen 3.2 m (10 ft 6 in), relatively reliable Typically up to 2 m (6 ft 7 in), relatively reliable Little information about size is available (known from only six specimens as of 2009)	
13	Dark-spotted anaconda	Eunectes deschauenseei (sometimes confused with E. notaeus)	Boidae	30 kg (66 lb)		3 m (9 ft 10 in), relatively reliable	
14	Papuan python	Apodora papuana	Pythonidae	Average reported as 22.5 kg (50 lb); Little information about size is available		One reasonably reliable report of 4.39 m (14 ft 4.8 in); Average reported as 4 m (13 ft 1.5 in); Often reaches 3–4 m (9 ft 10.1 in – 13 ft 1.5 in); Most specimens 1.4–3.6 m (4 ft 7 in – 11 ft 10 in); Little information about size is available	

== By families ==
=== Boas (Boidae) ===
- The most massive living member of this highly diverse reptilian order is the green anaconda (Eunectes murinus) of the neotropical riverways. These may exceed 8.8 m (29 ft) and 227 kg (500 lb), although such reports are not fully verified. Rumors of larger anacondas also persist.

=== Pythons (Pythonidae) ===
- The reticulated python (Python reticulatus) of Southeast Asia is longer but more slender than the green anaconda, and has been reported to measure as much as 10 m (33 ft) in length and to weigh up to 158 kg (348 lb).

=== Typical snakes (Colubridae) ===
- Among the colubrids, the most diverse snake family, the largest snakes may be the keeled rat snake (Ptyas carinata) at up to 4 m (13 ft). The genus Drymarchon also contains some of the largest colubrids such as the eastern indigo snake (Drymarchon couperi) and the indigo snake (Drymarchon corais) which can both reach lengths of almost 3 m (9.8 ft). The former may grow to weights of 5 kg (11 lb) or greater.
- Another large species in this family is the false water cobra (Hydrodynastes gigas) reaching a length of 3 m (9.8 ft), and a mass of 4.56 kg (10.1 lb), one of the largest venomous snakes in South America. The tiger rat snake (Spilotes pullatus), also living in South America, can reach a length of 2.7 m (8 ft 10 in). The yellow-bellied puffing snake (Pseustes sulphureus) can exceed a length of 3 m (9.8 ft).
- The largest racer, the Hispaniola racer (Haitiophis anomalus), at an average length of 2 m (6 ft 7 in), is the longest snake species in the West Indies.

=== Elapids (Elapidae) ===
King cobra, the largest elapid

- The longest venomous snake is the king cobra (Ophiophagus hannah), with lengths (recorded in captivity) of up to 5.7 m (19 ft) and a weight of up to 12.7 kg (28 lb). The second-longest venomous snake in the world is possibly the African black mamba (Dendroaspis polylepis), which can grow up to 4.5 m (15 ft). Among the genus Naja, the longest member arguably may be the forest cobra (Naja melanoleuca), which can reportedly grow up to 3 m (9.8 ft). In the case of the Indian cobra (Naja naja), the majority of adult specimens range from 1 to 1.5 m (3 ft 3 in to 4 ft 11 in) in length. Some specimens, particularly those from Sri Lanka, may grow to lengths of 2.1 to 2.2 m (6 ft 11 in to 7 ft 3 in), but this is relatively uncommon.

=== Blind snakes (Leptotyphlopidae) ===
- The largest blind snake Giant blind snake (Rena maxima) is a female with a snout-to-vent length (SVL) of 33 cm (13 in) plus a tail 1.8 cm (0.71 in) long.

=== Lamprophids (Lamprophiidae) ===
- The largest lamprophids Cape file snake (Heterolepsis capensis) is a medium to large snake. With an average total length (including tail) of about 120 cm (3 ft 11 in), specimens of 165 cm (5 ft 5 in) total length have been recorded. It has a very flat head, and its body is strikingly triangular in cross-section.

=== Vipers (Viperidae) ===
- The Gaboon viper (Bitis gabonica), a very bulky species with a maximum length of around 2 m (6 ft 7 in), is typically the heaviest non-constrictor snake and the biggest member of the viper family, with unverified specimens reported to as much as 20 kg (44 lb). The wild verified largest specimen of 1.8 m (5 ft 11 in) total length, caught in 1973, was found to have weighed 11.3 kg (25 lb) with an empty stomach. And therefore, the heaviest venomous snake and also the largest species of viper in present usually is an eastern diamondback rattlesnake (Crotalus adamanteus) with a maximum reliable mass in 15.4 kg (34 lb) and maximum length of 2.4 m (7 ft 10 in). While not quite as heavy, another member of the viper family is longer still, the South American bushmaster (Lachesis muta), with a maximum length of 3.65 m (12.0 ft).
- The rattlesnake genus Crotalus, which includes the aforementioned eastern diamondback rattlesnake and western diamondback rattlesnake (Crotalus atrox), reaches a maximum length of 2.13 m (7 ft 0 in), and according to W. A. King one large specimen had a length of 2.26 m (7 ft 5 in) and a mass of 11 kg (24 lb). The third largest rattlesnake is the Mexican west coast rattlesnake (Crotalus basiliscus), which reaches 2.04 m (6 ft 8 in) long and 7.7 kg (17 lb) mass, and one captive-raised male was weighed at 8.8 kg (19.4 lb) in 2020.

== Remarkable individual specimens ==
Individual specimens considered among largest measured for their respective species include the following:

=== Green anacondas ===
- Specimen killed in February 2013 in the state of Acre, Brazil in the municipality of Feijó reportedly weighing 170 kg (370 lb).

The skeleton of this specimen was apparently preserved at the Federal University of Acre and reportedly measured 6.21 m (20.4 ft), which implies that the live snake must have been about 6.4 m (21 ft 0 in) to 6.5 m (21 ft 4 in). Weight appears not reliably verified, but is plausible for a bulky specimen of that length based on allometric scaling of verified bulky specimens of shorter length.

- Specimen caught at Vale das Palmeiras, Guarantã do Norte, Mato Grosso, Brazil, 26 August 2011 reportedly measuring 6 m (19 ft 8 in) and weighing 120 kg (260 lb)
- Captive specimen at Reptilarium du Larzac, France measured as 6 m (19 ft 8 in) and 147 kg (324 lb)
- Captive specimen named "Pippi" at Den lille dyrehage in Arendal, Norway measured 6 m (19 ft 8 in) and weighed 120 kg (260 lb)

=== Burmese pythons ===
- Wild caught (non-native invasive) Burmese python (Python bivittatus) female♀ 5.7912 m (19 ft 0 in) (19 ft) 56.699 kg (125.00 lb) caught in the Big Cypress National Preserve in eastern Collier County, Florida by Jake Waleri and Stephen Gauta on 10 July 2023. Waleri and several friends caught the large snake. They brought her to the Conservancy of Southwest Florida to have her officially documented. New current world record longest Burmese Python recorded by official measurement 12 July 2023.
- "Baby" a captive Burmese python (Python bivittatus) female♀ 5.74 m (18 ft 10 in), 182.8 kg (403 lb); "Baby" was kept at Serpent Safari in Gurnee, Illinois, until her death at almost 27 years old, euthanized due to deteriorating condition caused by a tumor in 2006. Several live measurements and post mortem measurement.
- "Hexxie" a captive Burmese python (Python bivittatus) female♀ 5.48 m (18.0 ft), 110 kg (240 lb) and still growing; "Hexxie" lives in a terraced house in Tewkesbury, Gloucestershire, England, with owner Marcus Hobbs.
- Wild-caught non-native (invasive) Burmese python (Python bivittatus) female♀ 5.39 m (17.7 ft), 98 kg (216 lb) and measured 64 cm (25 in) in diameter; She was carrying 122 developing eggs. Caught by a team of biologists in Everglades, Florida, 22 June 2022.
- Wild-caught non-native (invasive) Burmese python (Python bivittatus) male♂ 5.23 m (17.2 ft), 94 kg (207 lb) and measured 66 cm (26 in) in diameter; caught by Okeechobee Veterinary Hospital, Florida, 31 July 2009.
- Wild-caught non-native (invasive) Burmese python (Python bivittatus) female♀ 5.72 m (18.8 ft), 47.2 kg (104 lb); caught in Miami-Dade County, Florida, 2 October 2020.
- Wild-caught non-native (invasive) Burmese python (Python bivittatus) female♀ 5.68 m (18.6 ft), 58.1 kg (128 lb); caught in Miami-Dade County, Florida, 11 May 2012. Intact specimen measured post mortem by University of Florida.
- Wild-caught non-native (invasive) Burmese python (Python bivittatus) female♀ 5.56 m (18.2 ft), 60.3 kg (133 lb); caught by University of Florida wildlife biologist in Miami-Dade County, Florida, 9 July 2015. Intact specimen measured post mortem by University of Florida.
- Wild-caught non-native (invasive) Burmese python (Python bivittatus) female♀ 4.57 m (15.0 ft), 65.3 kg (144 lb); caught by Nicholas Banos and Leonardo Sanchez, Everglades, Florida, 1 April 2017.
- Wild-caught non-native (invasive) Burmese python (Python bivittatus) female♀ 5.2 m (17 ft), 63.5 kg (140 lb); she was carrying 73 developing eggs. Caught by Big Cypress National Preserve, Florida, 7 April 2019.

=== Reticulated pythons ===
- "Medusa" a captive reticulated python (Malayopython reticulatus) female♀ 7.67 m (25.2 ft) 158.8 kg (350 lb); "Medusa" is kept at the Edge of Hell haunted house attraction in Kansas City, Missouri, and was last officially measured in 2011.
- "Samantha" a captive (originally wild-caught near Samarinda, Borneo, as an already very large adult) reticulated python (Malayopython reticulatus) female♀ 7.92 m (26.0 ft), somewhat reliable in 2002
- "Fluffy" a captive reticulated python (Malayopython reticulatus) female♀ 7.3 m (24 ft) 136 kg (300 lb); "Fluffy" was last officially measured live on 30 September 2009, and died at the Columbus Zoo and Aquarium in Powell, Ohio, on 26 October 2010, due to an apparent tumor. She was 18 years old. 24 feet confirmed when measured at death.
- "Colossus", a captive reticulated python (Maylayopython reticulatus) male♂, skeletal measurement 6.35 m (20.8 ft) 133.7 kg (295 lb); "Colossus" was kept at the Highland Park Zoo in Pittsburgh, Pennsylvania, died in April 1963, and the body was deposited at the Carnegie Museum.
- "Twinkie" a captive reticulated python (Malayopython reticulatus) female♀ 7 m (23 ft 0 in) 156 kg (344 lb); "Twinkie" found sanctuary in the 2014 Guinness World Records book as the world's largest albino python in captivity. She was a fixture at The Reptile Zoo in Fountain Valley, CA.
- "Super Snake", a captive reticulated python (Malayopython reticulatus) 14-year-old female♀ 7 m (23 ft), 115 kg (254 lb); "Super Snake" is kept at the National Aquarium in Al Qana, Abu Dhabi, United Arab Emirates.
- Wild-caught reticulated python (Malayopython reticulatus) Female♀ 7.5 m (25 ft) adjusted post-mortem measurement, unreliable, originally measured alive at 8 m (26 ft) unreliably, using an unknown method, 250 kg (550 lb) – estimated weight upon capture, unreliable; caught 7 April 2016, Paya Terubong district, Penang Island, Malaysia. Died 10 April 2016.
- Wild-caught reticulated python (Malayopython reticulatus) unknown sex 7.8 m (26 ft), unverified; Was killed on 5 October 2017, Pekanbaru, Indonesia.
- Wild-caught reticulated python (Malayopython reticulatus) unknown sex 6 m (20 ft), 80 kg (180 lb); Probably, this is largest snake in Phuket in last decade. Caught by Ruamjai Rescue Foundation, 18 December 2014, Phuket, Thailand.

=== Australian scrub pythons ===
- "Maximus" a captive scrub python (Simalia kinghorni) male♂ 5.1 m (17 ft), 25 kg (55 lb), at the peak weighed about 27 kg (60 lb), when he was last weighed and measured in 2008; "Maximus" is believed to be the largest Australian native snake in captivity. He is kept at the Currumbin Wildlife Sanctuary on the Gold Coast, Queensland.
- Wild-caught scrub python (Simalia kinghorni) unknown sex 5 m (16 ft), 28 kg (62 lb); caught by Machans Beach in Cairns, Queensland, 14 November 2017.
- Wild-caught scrub python (Simalia kinghorni) unknown sex 5.1 m (17 ft), 27 kg (60 lb); caught by Speewah in Mareeba, Queensland, unknown date.
- Wild-caught scrub pythons (Simalia kinghorni) unknown sex Both of were more 5 m (16 ft 5 in) (Second caught as stated measuring 5.1 m (16 ft 9 in) long and 27 kg (60 lb) in weight); caught by Speewah in Mareeba, Queensland, 24 October 2016.
- Wild-caught scrub python (Simalia kinghorni) unknown sex 5.2 m (17 ft), 22 kg (49 lb); caught by Speewah in Mareeba, Queensland, 6 February 2017.

== See also ==
- List of largest reptiles
- List of largest extant lizards
- Largest organisms
- Titanoboa and Vasuki, two of the world's largest known fossil snakes
- Gigantophis, a previous record-holder for the world's largest fossil snake
