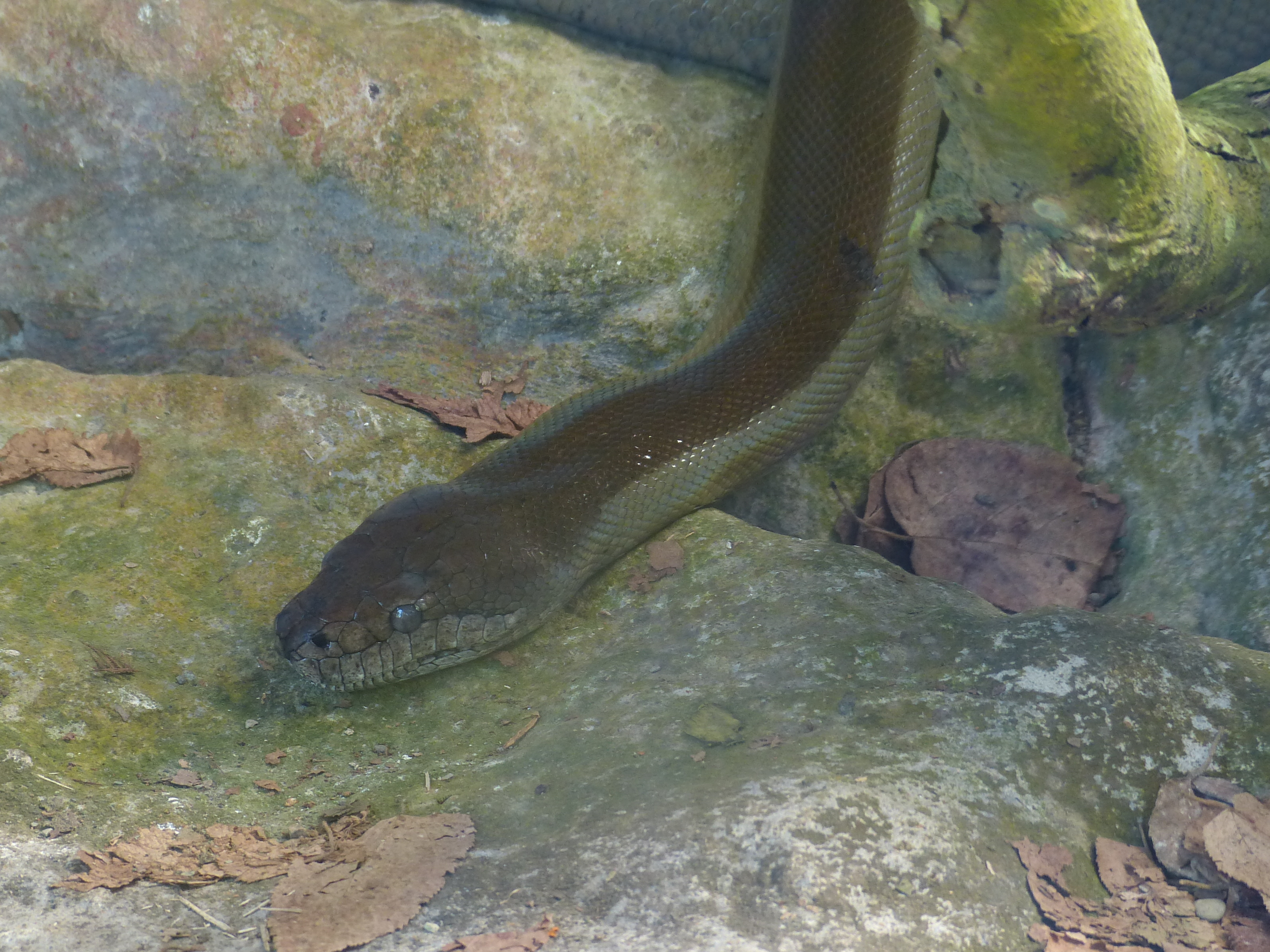

Conservation status
- Least Concern (IUCN 3.1)

Scientific classification
- Kingdom: Animalia
- Phylum: Chordata
- Class: Reptilia
- Order: Squamata
- Suborder: Serpentes
- Family: Pythonidae
- Genus: Apodora; Kluge, 1993
- Species: A. papuana

Binomial name
- Apodora papuana (Peters and Doria, 1878)

Synonyms
- Liasis papuanus Peters & Doria, 1878; Liasis papuanus Boulenger, 1893; Liasis papuanus Boulenger, 1895; Liasis tornieri Werner, 1897; Liasis olivaceus papuanus Stull, 1935; Liasis maximus Werner, 1936; Liasis papuano Werner, 1936; Liasis papuanus McDowell, 1975; Lisalia papuana Wells & Wellington, 1985; Morelia papuana Underwood & Stimson, 1990; Apodora papuana Kluge, 1993

= Apodora =

Genus of snakes

Apodora papuana is a species of python, commonly known as the Papuan python, Irian python or Papuan olive python. It is found in New Guinea. It is the only species in the genus Apodora. No subspecies are currently recognized.

== Description ==
The Papuan python is a large snake, with adults growing to an average length of 4 meters (13 ft) and some specimens growing to lengths of over 5 meters (16 ft). However, they are not nearly as heavy-bodied as most other pythons, typically weighing only about 22.5 kilograms (50 lb). The available information about the species size is limited. They are noted for having the ability to change color, though the exact mechanism and reasons for it are not completely understood. The color is reputed to change when the snake is agitated. They can vary from black to a mustard yellow, but are normally an olive green in appearance when young and dark olive when older, with the sides and underside distinctly lighter.

== Distribution and habitat ==
Papuan pythons are found in most of New Guinea, from Misool to Fergusson Island. The type locality given is "Ramoi Nova Guinea austro-occidentiali" (Ramoi, near Sorong, Irian Jaya, Indonesia).

== Behavior ==
The Papuan python is largely terrestrial and mostly nocturnal. Despite their size and impressive strength, they are relatively inoffensive animals and are not prone to bite even if handled.

== Feeding ==
Their diet consists primarily of smaller mammals, but they are also known to be partly ophiophagous.

== Captivity ==
The Papuan python is not commonly available in the exotic pet trade, and when they are available they command high prices. They are a relatively hardy species that adapts well to captivity, readily feeding in commercially available rats. Captive breeding has been done.

== See also ==
- List of largest snakes
