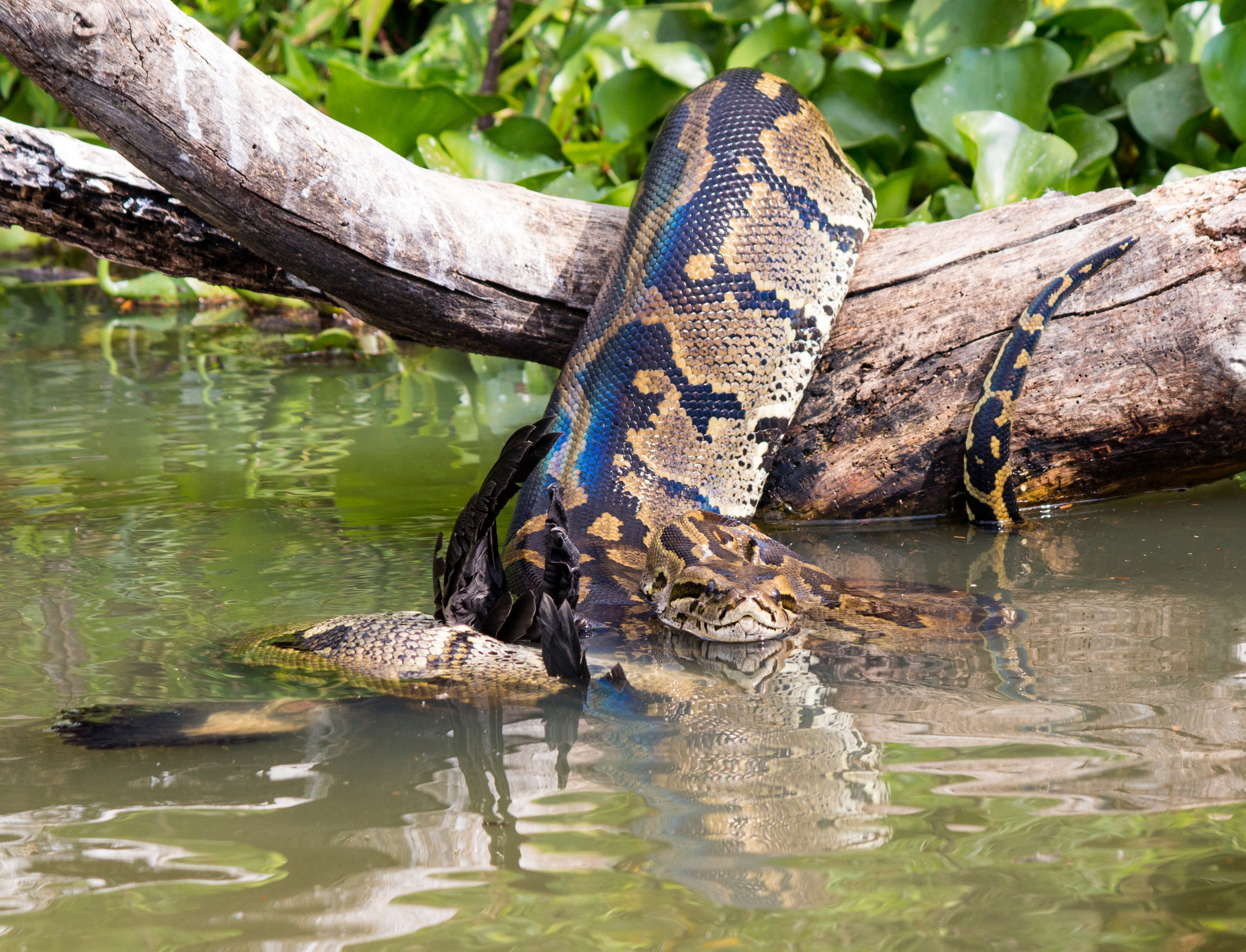
- Central African rock python after hunting a cormorant, Lake Naivasha, Kenya

Conservation status
- Near Threatened (IUCN 3.1)

Scientific classification
- Kingdom: Animalia
- Phylum: Chordata
- Class: Reptilia
- Order: Squamata
- Suborder: Serpentes
- Family: Pythonidae
- Genus: Python
- Species: P. sebae

Binomial name
- Python sebae (Gmelin, 1789)
- Range of Python sebae Range of Python natalensis Range of hybrids

Synonyms
- List: Coluber sebae Gmelin, 1789; Coluber speciosus Bonnaterre, 1790; Boa hieroglyphica Schneider, 1801; Python houttuyni Daudin, 1803; Python liberiensis Hallowell, 1845; Hortulia sebae Gray, 1849; Boa liberiensis Hallowell, 1854; Python sebae Boettger, 1887; Python sebae Boulenger, 1893; Python jubalis Pitman, 1936; Python sebae sebae Broadley, 1983; Python sebae Branch, 1991; Python sebae Kluge, 1993

= Central African rock python =

Species of snake

The Central African rock python (Python sebae) is a species of large constrictor snake in the family Pythonidae. The species is native to sub-Saharan Africa. It is one of ten living species in the genus Python.

It is Africa's largest snake, and one of the eight largest snake species in the world, along with the green anaconda, reticulated python, Burmese python, Southern African rock python, Indian python, yellow anaconda and Australian scrub python. Specimens may approach or exceed 6 m (20 ft). The Southern African rock python is generally smaller than its northern relative and in general, the Central African rock python is regarded as one of the longest species of snake in the world. The snake is found in a variety of habitats, from forests to near deserts, although usually near sources of water. The snake becomes dormant during the dry season. The Central African rock python kills its prey by constriction and often eats animals up to the size of antelope, occasionally even crocodiles. The snake reproduces by egg-laying. Unlike most snakes, the female protects her nest and sometimes even her hatchlings.

The snake is widely feared, though it is nonvenomous and very rarely kills humans. Although the snake is not endangered, it does face threats from habitat reduction and hunting. Some cultures in sub-Saharan Africa consider it a delicacy, which may pose a threat to its population.

== Taxonomy and etymology ==
The Central African rock python was first described by Johann Friedrich Gmelin, a German naturalist, in 1789. It is one of ten species in the genus Python, large constricting snakes found in the moist tropics of Asia and Africa.

The generic name Python is a Greek word referring to the enormous serpent at Delphi slain by Apollo in Greek mythology. The specific name sebae is a latinization of the surname of Dutch zoologist, Albertus Seba. Common name usage varies with the species referred to as the African rock python or simply the rock python.

== Description ==
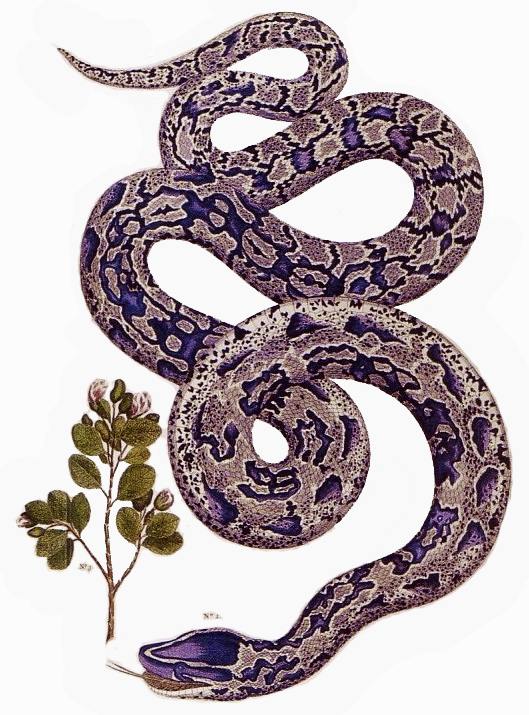
An 18th-century illustration

The Central African rock python is Africa's largest snake species and one of the world's largest. Adults measure 3 to 3.53 m (9 ft 10 in to 11 ft 7 in) in total length, with only unusually large specimens likely to exceed 4.8 m (15 ft 9 in). Reports of specimens over 6 m (19 ft 8 in) are considered reliable, although larger specimens have never been confirmed. Weights are reportedly in the range of 55 to 65 kg (121 to 143 lb) or more. Exceptionally large specimens weigh 91 kg (201 lb) or more. On average, large adults of Central African rock pythons are quite heavily built, perhaps more so than most specimens of the somewhat longer reticulated as well as Indian and Burmese pythons and far more so than the amethystine python, although the species is on average less heavily built than the green anaconda. The species may be the second heaviest living snake with some authors agreeing that it can exceptionally exceed 100 kg (220 lb), possibly up to 200 kg (440 lb). A large specimen considered authentic was shot in the Gambia and measured 7.5 m (24 ft 7 in).

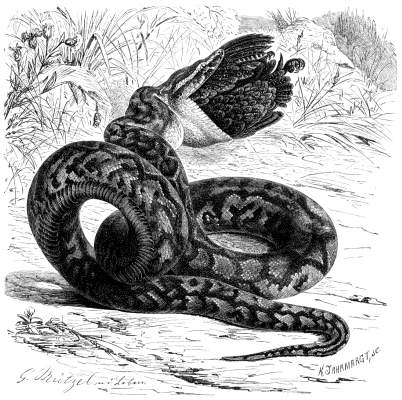
Illustration by German zoologist Alfred Brehm in his treatise Brehms Thierleben

The snake varies considerably in body size between different areas. In general, it is smaller in highly populated regions, such as in southern Nigeria, only reaching its maximum length in areas such as Sierra Leone, where the human population density is lower. Males are typically smaller than females. One individual captured in Côte d'Ivoire was allegedly 9.96 m (32.7 ft) long.

The body is thick and covered with coloured blotches, often joining up in a broad, irregular stripe. Body markings vary between brown, olive, chestnut, and yellow, but fade to white on the underside. The head is triangular and is marked on top with a dark brown "spear-head" outlined in buffy yellow. Teeth are many, sharp, and backwardly curved. Under the eye, there is a distinctive triangular marking, the subocular mark. Like all pythons, the scales of the African rock python are small and smooth. Those around the lips possess heat-sensitive pits, which are used to detect warm-blooded prey, even in the dark. Pythons also possess two functioning lungs, unlike more advanced snakes, which have only one, and also have small, visible pelvic spurs, believed to be the vestiges of hind limbs.

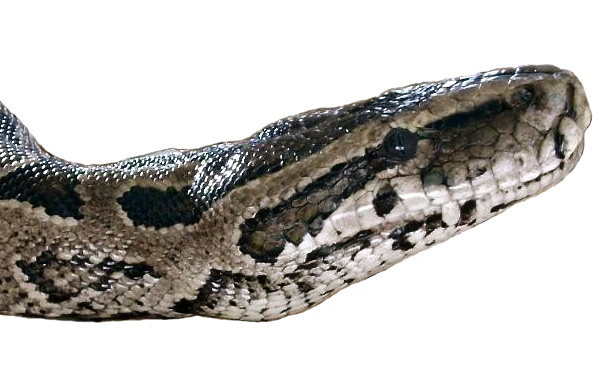
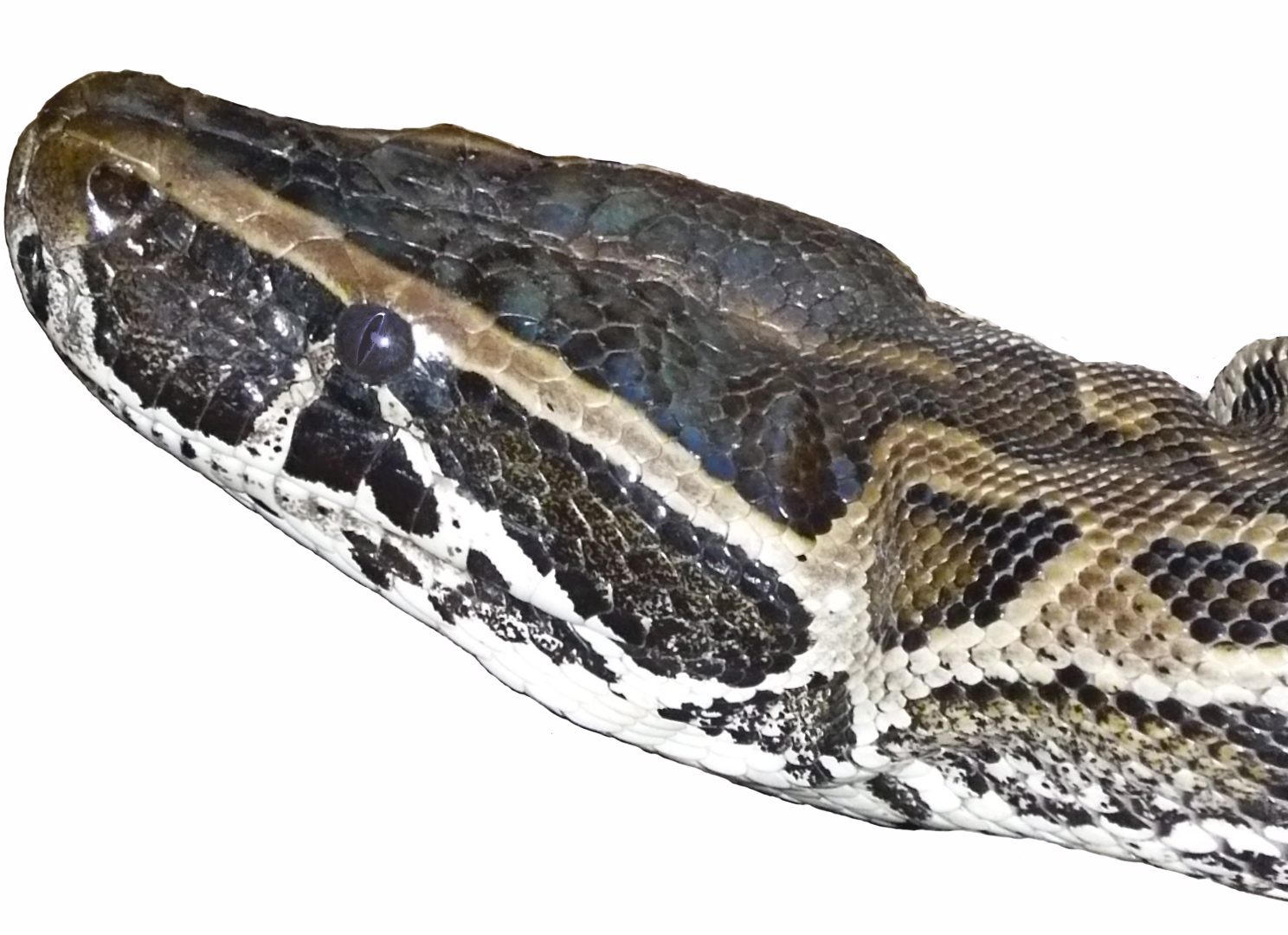
Cephalic features of the Southern African rock python (Python natalensis, left) and the Central African rock python (Python sebae, on the right).

The Southern African rock python and the Central African rock python differ in the following ways:

- The southern has a similar colour to its northern relative, however it is described as being "drabber".
- P. sebae has two prominent light lines from the nose, over the eye to the back of the head, which are much duller in P. natalensis.
- The northern species has considerably larger head scales.
- Also, P. natalensis is typically smaller in size relative to P. sebae. P. natalensis reaches an average length of between 2.8 and 4 m (max.size measured 5.8 m.) and, while P. sebae with an average length between 2.7 and 4.6 m long (max.size measured 6.5 m.).
- In P. natalensis, the dark patch in front of and posterior to the eye is paler and narrower than in P. sebae, giving the appearance of a dark stripe as opposed to a yellow stripe at the level of the eye.

== Distribution and habitat ==
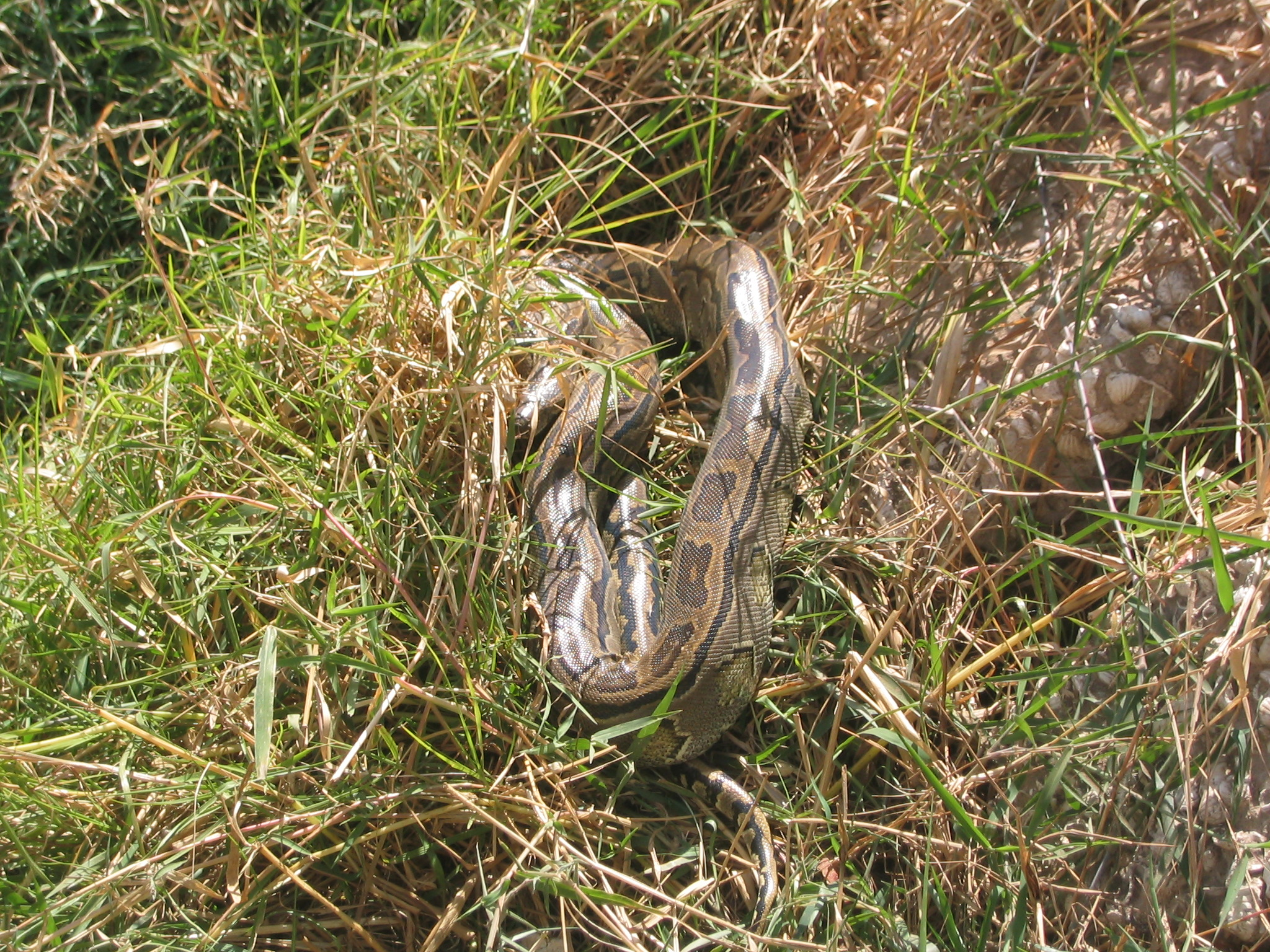
Central African rock python in Djoudj National Bird Sanctuary

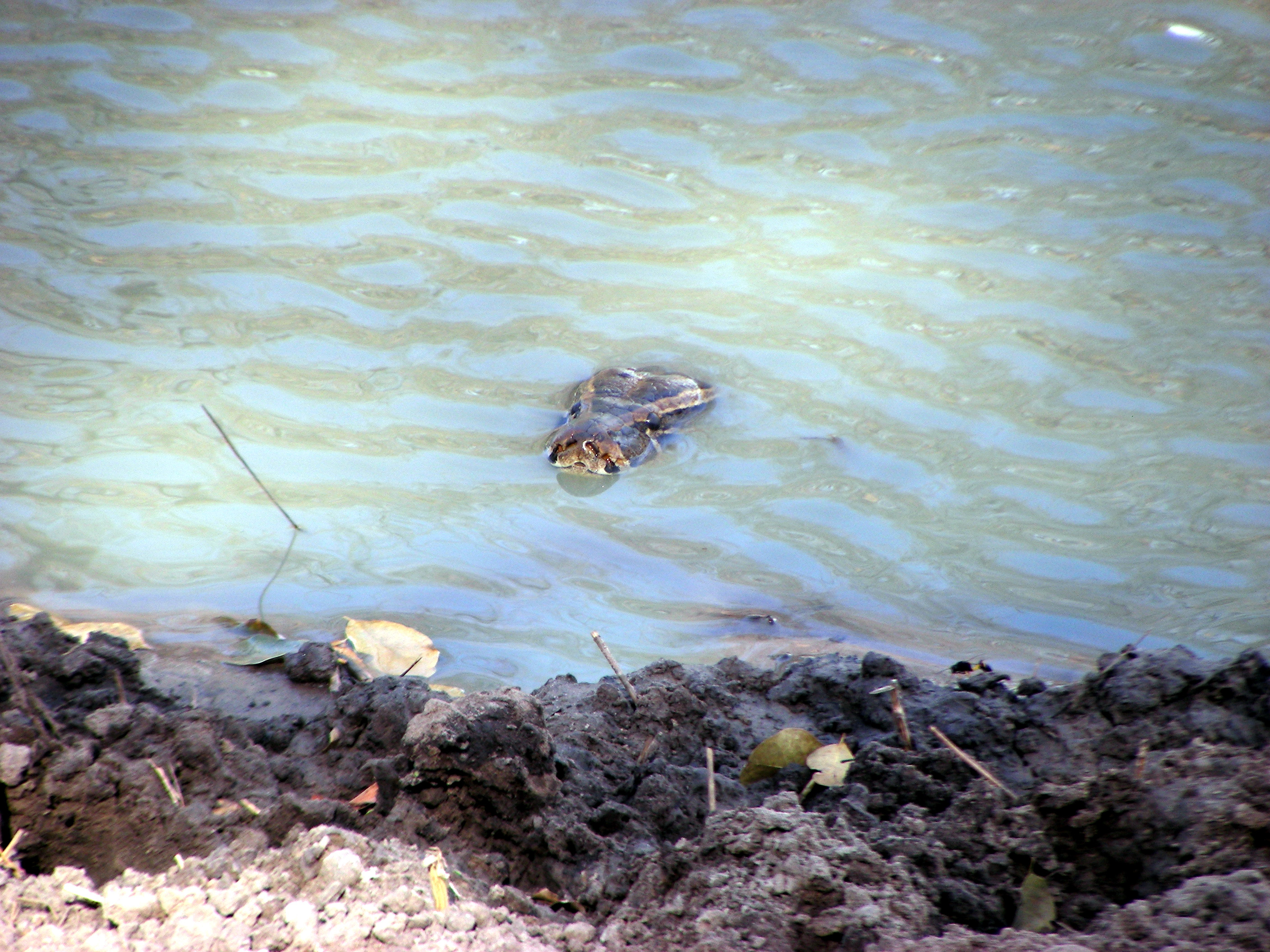
Adult Central African rock python at the edge of a watering hole in Fathala Reserve, Senegal

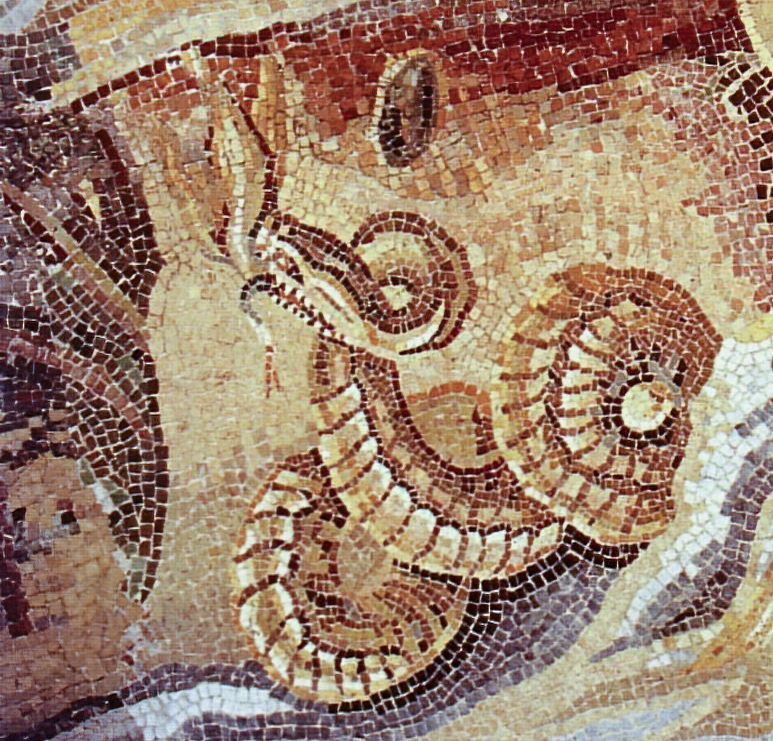
A Roman mosaic showing a Central African rock python from the southern Nile

The Central African rock python occurs throughout much of tropical sub-Saharan Africa. It ranges across central and western Africa, from Senegal east to Ethiopia and Somalia and south to northern Angola and northern Tanzania.

The Central African rock python inhabits a wide range of habitats, including forest, savanna, grassland, semidesert, and rocky areas. It is particularly associated with areas of permanent water, on the edges of swamps, lakes, and rivers. It also adapts to disturbed habitats around settlements, especially cane fields.

In 2009, a Central African rock python was found in the Everglades. It is feared to be establishing itself as an invasive species alongside the already-established Burmese python. Feral rock pythons were also noted in the 1990s in the Everglades.

== Behaviour and ecology ==
=== Feeding ===
Like all pythons, the Central African rock python is non-venomous and kills by constriction. After gripping the prey, it coils around it, tightening its coils every time the victim breathes out. Death is thought to be caused by cardiac arrest rather than by asphyxiation or crushing. The Central African rock python mainly feeds on small antelopes, hyraxes, monkeys and occasionally waterbirds, monitor lizards and crocodiles. Poultry, dogs, goats and other livestock are eaten in suburban areas. Central African rock pythons may also prey on the cubs of lions, leopards and hyenas. In March 2017, a 3.9-m (12-ft 10-in) African rock python was filmed eating a large adult male spotted hyena weighing 70 kg (150 lb). This encounter suggests that the snake might very well be capable of hunting and killing larger and more dangerous animals than previously thought. The largest ever recorded meal of any snake was when a 4.9 m African Rock Python consumed a 59 kg impala.

=== Reproduction ===
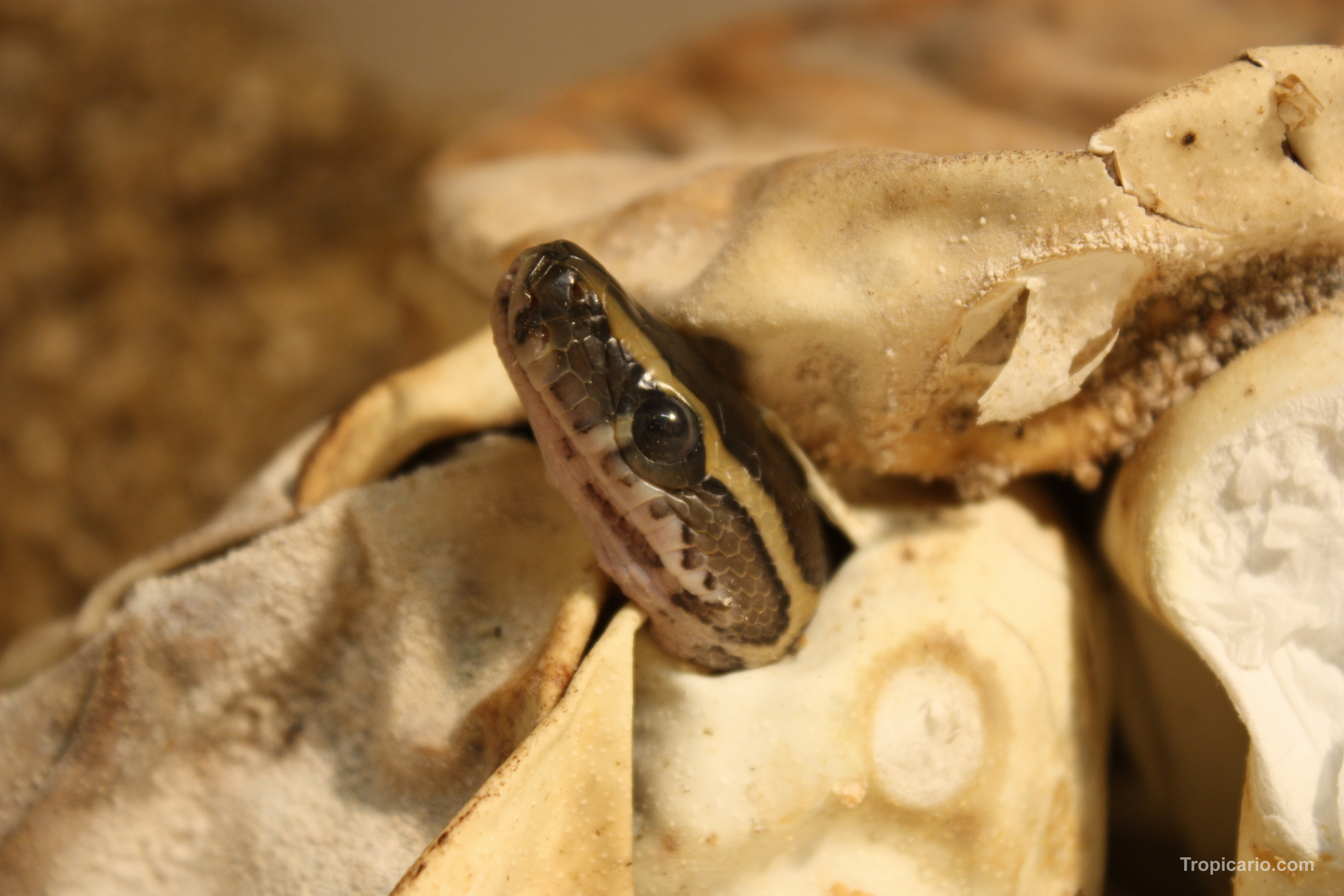
Central African rock python emerging from egg

Reproduction occurs in the spring. Central African rock pythons are oviparious, laying between 20 and 100 hard-shelled, elongated eggs in an old animal burrow, termite mound, or cave. The female shows a surprising level of maternal care, coiling around the eggs, protecting them from predators, and possibly helping to incubate them, until they hatch around 90 days later. The female guards the hatchlings for up to two weeks after they hatch from their eggs to protect them from predators in a manner unusual for snakes in general and pythons in particular.

Hatchlings are between 45 and 60 cm (17.5 and 23.5 in) in length and appear virtually identical to adults, except with more contrasting colours. Individuals may live over 12 years in captivity.

== Human interaction ==
=== Attacks ===
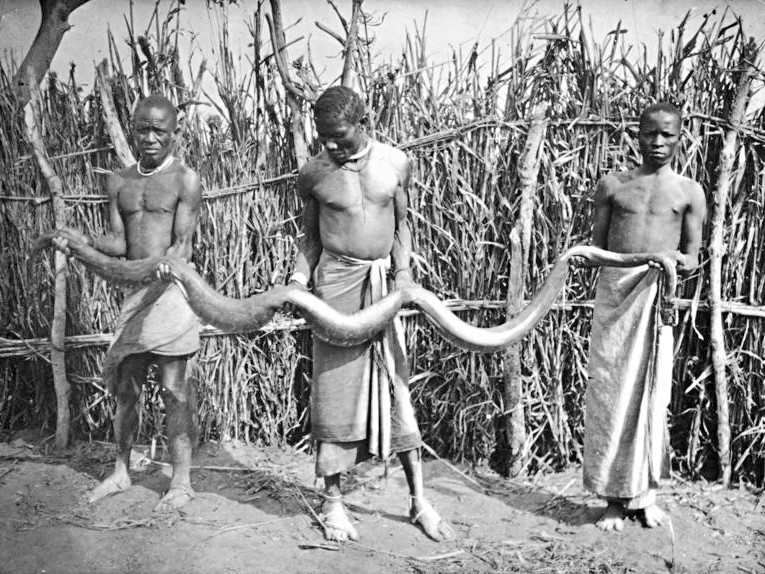
Early 1900s, East Africa

Documented attacks on humans are exceptionally rare, despite the species being common in many regions of Africa, and living in diverse habitats including those with agricultural activity. Few deaths are well-substantiated, with no reports of a human being consumed. Large specimens (which are more common in Western Africa) "would have no difficulty in eating adult humans", though it would have to be a small adult human.

==== Well-substantiated attacks ====
- A scholarly article published in 1980 said no prior well-substantiated fatalities were reported of humans killed by Central African rock pythons, and the only prior such attack by any type of python or boa was by a reticulated python in 1927.
- In 1999 in Centralia, Illinois, a 3-year-old boy was suffocated during the night by an escaped 2.3 m (7.5 ft) pet African rock python. Bite marks around the boy's neck and ears may have resulted from an attempt to swallow him.
- In 2013 in Campbellton, New Brunswick, Canada, two brothers aged four and six were reportedly killed by a 4.3-to-4.9 m (14-to-16 ft), 45 kg (99 lb) Central African rock python kept by a pet shop owner. The circumstances of the incident prompted some skepticism from experts not involved in the case. An autopsy showed that the boys died of asphyxiation, which does not fit with how constricting snakes kill. The owner was charged with criminal negligence for not adequately protecting the boys from the snake. (See main article).
- In 2017, a 2.4 m-long (8 ft) female Central African rock python, kept as a pet in Hampshire, England, was found to have killed its owner by asphyxiation, according to a coroner's inquest.

==== Other reported attacks ====
- In 2009 in Sabaki Village, Malindi District, Kenya, a male farm manager was reportedly attacked after stepping on a 4 m (13 ft) python, the exact species of which was not determined. After an hour's struggle, he was reportedly dragged up a tree, but was then rescued by police and villagers after he was able to call for help on his mobile phone. The snake was reportedly captured by police, but had escaped and disappeared by the next day. The man said he bit the snake's tail while he was being attacked and was injured on his lower lip because the tip of the tail was sharp.

=== Bushmeat ===
As the mammalian and avian game populations are gradually depleted in the Congo Basin, the proportion of large-bodied snakes offered at rural bushmeat markets increases. Consequently, a large proportion of the human population faces the threat of Armillifer armillatus infections, a python-borne zoonotic disease.

=== Conservation ===
People are often fearful of large pythons and may kill them on sight. The Central African rock python is threatened by hunting for leather in some areas. Consequently, it is listed as a Near threatened species. It is also collected for the pet trade, although it is not generally recommended as a pet due to its large size and unpredictable temperament. Little information is available on levels of international trade in this species.

Some of the Central African rock python's habitats are also known to be under threat. For example, mangrove and rainforest habitats and their snake communities are under serious threat in southeastern Nigeria from habitat destruction and exploration for the oil industry.

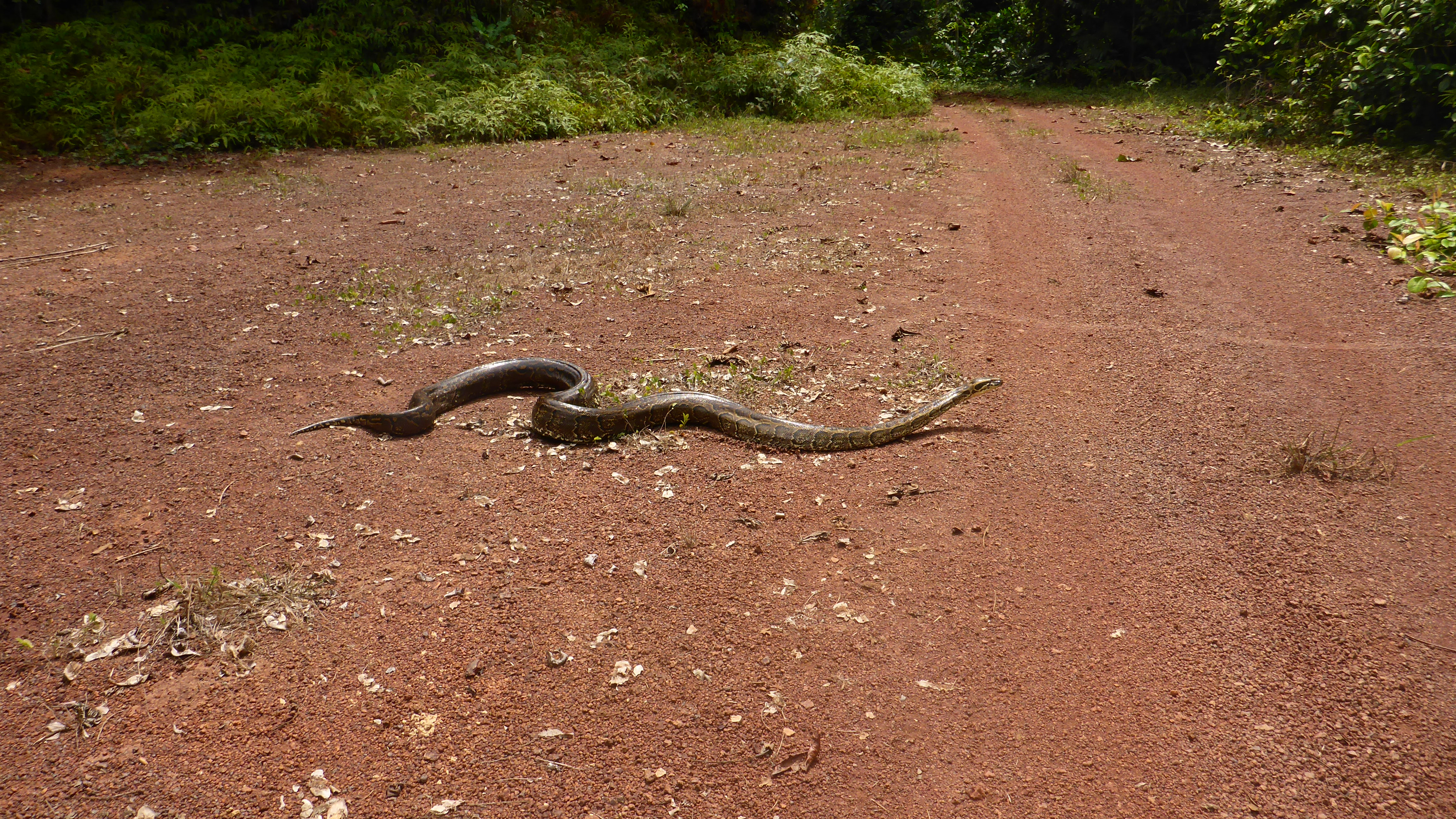
The Central African rock python on the road to the south of Ivindo National Park, Gabon

The Central African rock python is still relatively common in many regions across Africa, and may adapt to disturbed habitats, provided that food is available. The Central African rock python's population in West Africa has suffered greatly, whilst the Southern African species has fared better. This species is heavily exploited throughout its West African range, particularly for bushmeat and leather, and high rates of decline have been reported within the region. These declines appear to exceed 60% over three generations. However, both subspecies have faced declines in population and consequently it is at high risk of being a threatened species. It is listed on Appendix II of the Convention on International Trade in Endangered Species, meaning international trade in Central African rock pythons should be carefully monitored and controlled, giving wild populations some protection from overcollection for pets and skins. The species is also likely to occur in a number of protected areas, such as the Serengeti National Park in Tanzania, a World Heritage site.

In the Florida Everglades, where the Central African rock python is an invasive species and posing a threat to indigenous wildlife, it has no protected status and is one of the species listed on a hunting program recently authorized by state officials to eradicate non-native reptiles, the others being the Burmese python, reticulated python, green anaconda, and Nile monitor.

=== In culture ===
Luo people of Kenya living mainly in the area near Lake Victoria generally consider snakes to be evil and believe that sorcerers make them harm people. They express a different attitude towards pythons – such as making them appear in play songs and even worshiping them. The Luo call the Central African rock python ng'ielo in their language, and with the songs containing a phrase ng'ielo jadhogre "python the coiling", children make a line and imitate a python's motion. When the Luo worship a python, they call her Omieri (or Omweri) a returning python-spirit. The python is then seen as a reincarnation of Omieri, Goddess of Harvest and linked with rain and fertility. One which appeared in 2003 raised international controversy over how she should be treated, with coverage from BBC News through the Daily Nation.

In some parts of eastern Nigeria, particularly in the towns of Idemili in Anambra, the python is revered as a sacred symbol of the deity Eke Idemili. Similarly, in Njaba, the Eke Njaba, a harmless snake regarded as the deity's property, is also held in high esteem. This reverence is so deeply ingrained culturally that even Christians in these areas have not fully renounced the sacredness of the snake, and any harm to the Eke Njaba requires ritual cleansing or even a proper burial when killed, to avoid the deity's wrath.

== See also ==
- List of largest snakes
