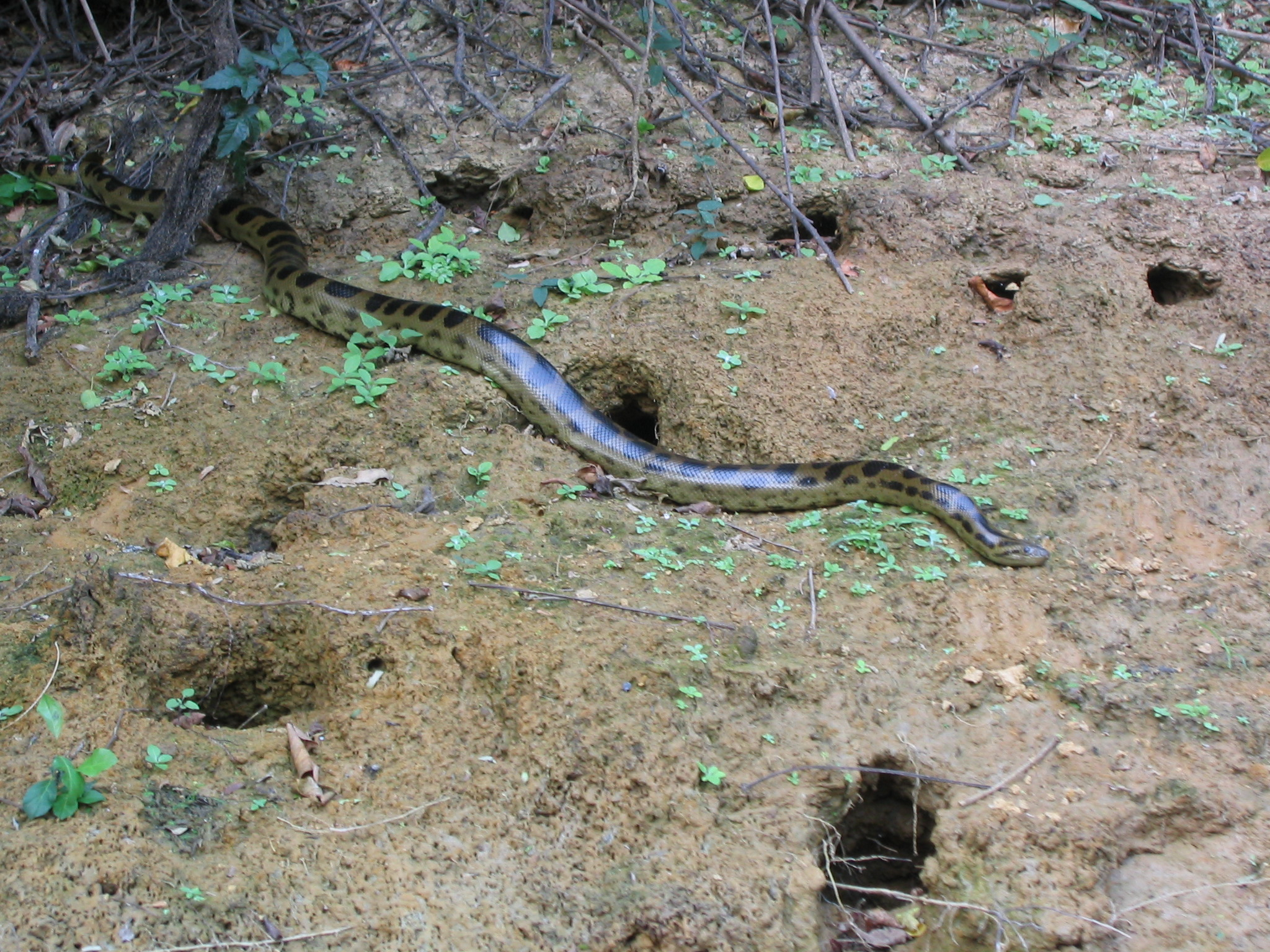

Conservation status
- Least Concern (IUCN 3.1)
- CITES Appendix II

Scientific classification
- Kingdom: Animalia
- Phylum: Chordata
- Class: Reptilia
- Order: Squamata
- Suborder: Serpentes
- Family: Boidae
- Genus: Eunectes
- Species: E. beniensis

Binomial name
- Eunectes beniensis Dirksen, 2002

= Eunectes beniensis =

Species of snake

Eunectes beniensis is a boa species known from the northeastern parts of Bolivia and possibly nearby Brazil. Its common names, the Bolivian anaconda and Beni anaconda, are derived from the geographic location of its native habitat: the Beni area of Bolivia. Like all boas, it is nonvenomous. It eats fish, chickens, dogs, and cats.

== Description ==
Eunectes beniensis is a species of boa, reaching between 3.3–4.4 meters (11–14 ft) in length and can weigh up to 35 kilograms (77 lb). It was initially believed to be the result of hybridization between the green (Eunectes murinus) and yellow anaconda (Eunectes notaeus), but was later determined to be a distinct species. Its taxonomic status is unclear due to lack of information and the similarity in appearance to Eunectes notaeus. It is closely related to Eunectes notaeus and Eunectes deschauenseei.

== Range, habitat and behavior ==
The Bolivian anaconda's habitat usually consists of wetlands and other muddy, swampy or flooded areas. It is known only from northern Bolivia.

In April 2022, three researchers published data on an observation of Bolivian river dolphins playing with a large (presumably deceased) E. beniensis specimen, possibly representing either an occasional food item for the dolphins or an item for adults to teach their young about. The species is also often seen predated on by caimans (C. yacare & M. niger) in the Bolivian Amazon. [6]

== See also ==
- List of largest snakes

== Bibliography ==
- Dirksen, Lutz (2002). Anakondas (in German). Münster: Natur und Tier-Verlag. ISBN 3-931587-43-6.
- Dirksen, Lutz; Böhme, Wolfgang (2005). "Studies on anacondas III. A reappraisal of Eunectes beniensis Dirksen, 2002, from Bolivia, and a key to the species of the genus Eunectes Wagler, 1830 (Serpentes: Boidae)". Russian Journal of Herpetology. 12 (3): 223–229. doi:10.30906/1026-2296-2005-12-3-223-229 (inactive 12 July 2025).
- Reed, Robert N.; Rodda, Gordon H. (2009). Giant constrictors: Biological and management profiles and an establishment risk assessment for nine large species of pythons, anacondas, and the boa constrictor. U.S. Geological Survey Open-File Report 2009-1202. Reston, Virginia: U.S. Geological Survey.
- Anonymous (1963). "Hybrid anacondas". Animal Kingdom. 66: 31.
- Dirksen, Lutz (1995). Zur Reptilienfauna Boliviens unter spezieller Berücksichtigung taxonomischer und zoogeographischer Aspekte (MSc) (in German). Bonn: Universität Bonn.
- Dirksen, Lutz (2000). Monographische Revision der Gattung Eunectes Wagler, 1830 (Serpentes, Boidae) (PhD) (in German). Bonn: Universität Bonn.
