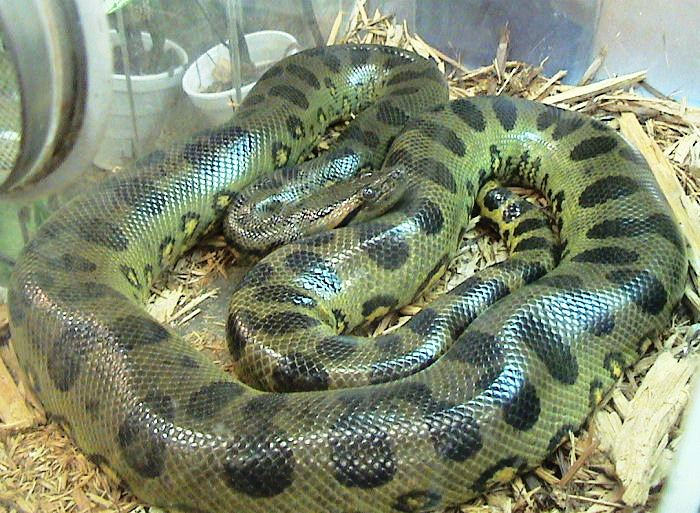
- Green anaconda (E. murinus)

Scientific classification
- Kingdom: Animalia
- Phylum: Chordata
- Class: Reptilia
- Order: Squamata
- Suborder: Serpentes
- Family: Boidae
- Subfamily: Boinae
- Genus: Eunectes; Wagler, 1830

Type species
- Boa murina (Linnaeus, 1758)
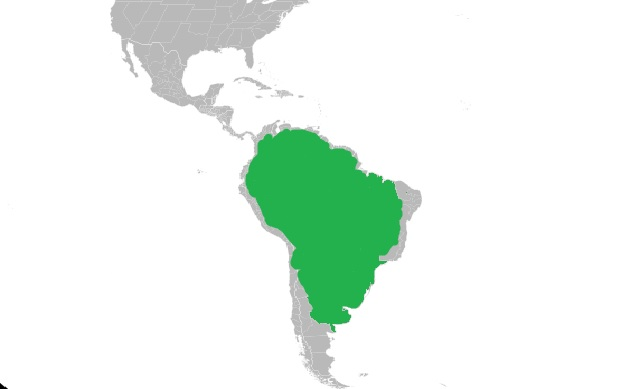
- Range of Eunectes

Synonyms
- Draco Oken, 1816 (preoccupied)

= Anaconda =

Anaconda Temporal range: Miocene–recent

Genus of snakes

Anacondas or water boas are a group of large boas of the genus Eunectes. They are a semiaquatic group of snakes found in tropical South America. Two to four extant and one extinct species are currently recognized, including one of the largest snakes in the world, E. murinus, the green anaconda.

== Etymology ==
The generic name Eunectes is derived from Ancient Greek: εὐνήκτης, romanized: eunēktēs, lit. 'good swimmer'.

The South American names anacauchoa and anacaona were suggested in an account by Peter Martyr d'Anghiera. The idea of a South American origin was questioned by Henry Walter Bates who, in his travels in South America, failed to find any similar name in use. The word anaconda is derived from the name of a snake from Ceylon (Sri Lanka) that John Ray described in Latin in his Synopsis Methodica Animalium (1693) as serpens indicus bubalinus anacandaia zeylonibus, ides bubalorum aliorumque jumentorum membra conterens. Ray used a catalogue of snakes from the Leyden museum supplied by Dr. Tancred Robinson. The description of its habit was based on Andreas Cleyer, who in 1684 described a gigantic snake that crushed large animals by coiling around their bodies and crushing their bones.

Henry Yule in his 1886 work Hobson-Jobson, notes that the word became more popular due to a piece of fiction published in 1768 in the Scots Magazine by a certain R. Edwin. Edwin described a 'tiger' being crushed to death by an anaconda, when there were never any tigers in Sri Lanka. (Note: In South Asian languages like Hindi, the leopard and tiger may share the same name, that is Bágh (Hindi: बाघ), and it is the former that occurs in Sri Lanka.) Yule and Frank Wall noted that the snake was likely a python and suggested a Tamil origin anai-kondra meaning elephant killer. A Sinhalese origin was also suggested by Donald Ferguson who pointed out that the word Henakandaya (hena lightning/large and kanda stem/trunk) was used in Sri Lanka for the small whip snake (Ahaetulla pulverulenta) and somehow got misapplied to the python before myths were created.

The name commonly used for the anaconda in Brazil is sucuri, sucuriju or sucuriuba.

== Description ==
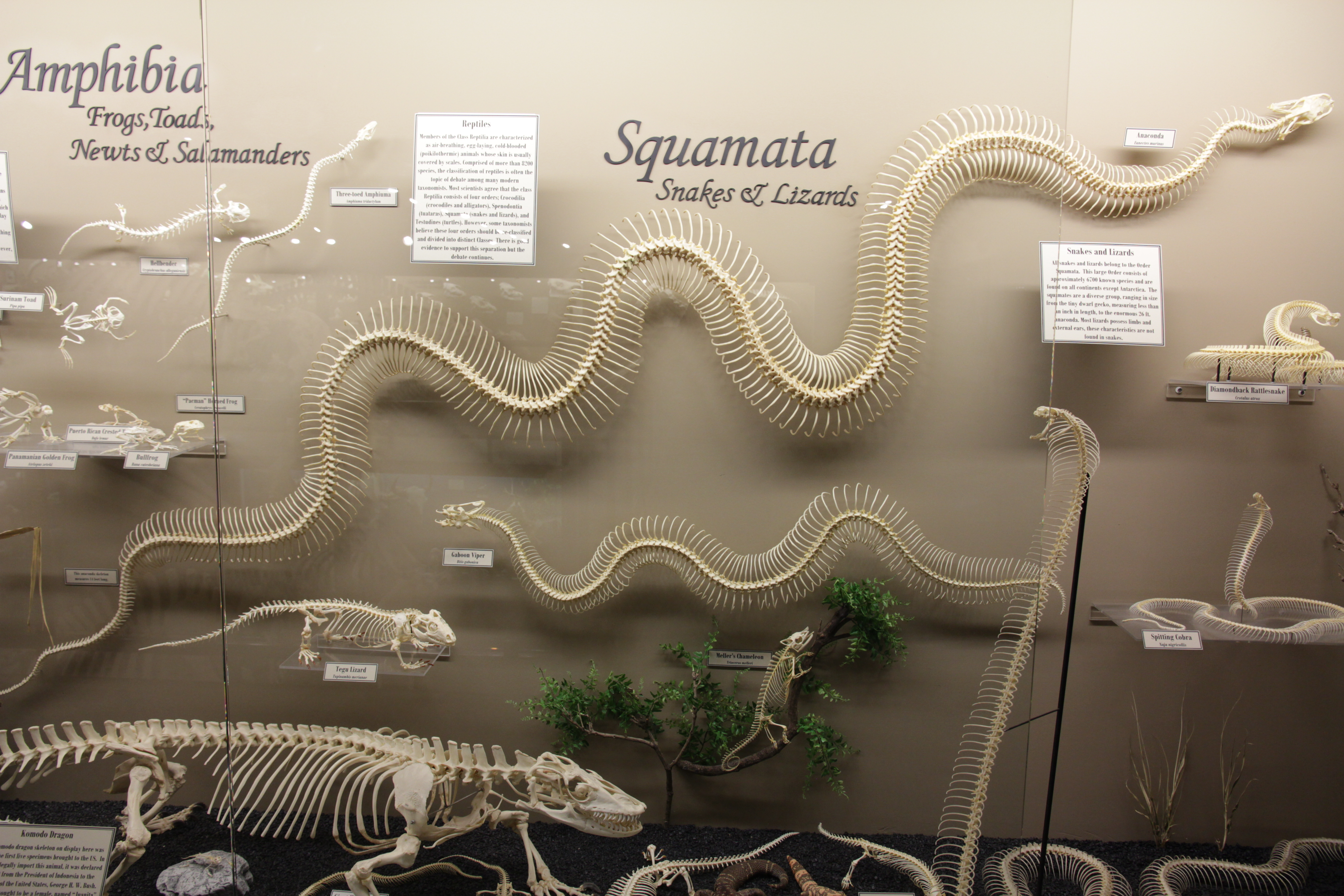
4.5-metre (14 ft) green anaconda skeleton on display at Museum of Osteology with other squamates and reptiles

Although the name applies to a group of snakes, it is often used to refer only to one species, in particular, the common or green anaconda (Eunectes murinus), which is the largest snake in the world by weight, and it is the second longest after the reticulated python.

Anacondas are native to South America, found in tropical regions from Ecuador, Brazil, Colombia and Venezuela south to northern Argentina.

== Systematics ==
Species	Taxon author	Common name	Geographic range	Image
E. beniensis (=E. notaeus?)	Dirksen, 2002	Bolivian anaconda	South America in the Departments of Beni and Pando in Bolivia	
E. deschauenseei (=E. notaeus?)	Dunn and Conant, 1936	Dark-spotted anaconda	South America in northern Brazil and coastal French Guiana	
E. murinus	(Linnaeus, 1758)	Green anaconda	Peru, Bolivia, French Guiana, Suriname and Brazil	
E. notaeus	Cope, 1862	Yellow anaconda	South America in eastern Bolivia, central-western Brazil, Paraguay and northeastern Argentina	
†E. stirtoni	Hoffstetter and Rage, 1977		This species is extinct; its fossils have been found in the La Venta fauna (Miocene) in Colombia. Its validity, however, is questionable.	

Rivas et al. revised the taxonomy of Eunectes, describing a new species of green anaconda (Eunectes akayima) and merging E. deschauenseei and E. beniensis with E. notaeus, which resulted in the recognition of only three species of anaconda. The result of their phylogenetic analysis is represented below:

- Green anacondas
  - Eunectes murinus
  - Eunectes akayima
- Eunectes notaeus
  - Eunectes notaeus
  - - Eunectes notaeus
    - - "Eunectes beniensis"
      - - Eunectes notaeus
        - "Eunectes deschauenseei"

In a response paper, Dubois et al. questioned the results of the mtDNA analysis above and the validity of Eunectes akayima. The name of the new species was considered a nomen nudum.

The recent fossil record of Eunectes is relatively sparse compared to other vertebrates and other genera of snakes. The fossil record of this group is effected by an artifact called the Pull of the Recent. Fossils of recent ancestors are not known, so the living species 'pull' the historical range of the genus to the present.

== Biology ==
Anacondas prey on fish, deer, capybaras, turtles, caiman, wading birds, and other birds associated with rivers and water bodies.

=== Reproduction ===
The mating seasons in Eunectes varies both between species and within species depending on locality, although the trend appears to be the dry season. The green anaconda (E. murinus) is the most well-studied species of Eunectes in terms of their mating system, followed by the yellow anaconda (E. notaeus); E. deschauenseei and E. beniensis are much less common, making the specific details of their mating systems less well understood.

==== Sexual dimorphism ====
Sexual size dimorphism in Eunectes is the opposite of most other vertebrates. Females are larger than males in most snakes, and green anacondas (E. murinus) have one of the most extreme size differences, where females average roughly 32 kg (70 lb) and males average only around 7 kg (15 lb). This size difference has several benefits for both sexes. Large size in females leads to higher fecundity and larger offspring; as a result male mate choice favours larger females. Large size is also favoured in males because larger males tend to be more successful at reproducing, both because of their size advantage in endurance rivalry and their advantage in sperm competition because larger males are able to produce more sperm. One reason that males are so much smaller in Eunectes is that large males can be confused for females, which interferes with their ability to mate when smaller males mistakenly coil them in breeding balls; as a result, there is an optimum size for males where they are large enough to successfully compete, but not large enough to risk other males trying to mate with them.

==== Breeding balls ====
During the mating season female anacondas release pheromones to attract males for breeding, which can result in polyandrous breeding balls; these breeding balls have been observed in E. murinus, E. notaeus, and E. deschauenseei, and likely also occur in E. beniensis. In anaconda breeding balls, several males coil around one female and attempt to position themselves as close to her cloaca as possible where they use their pelvic spurs to "tickle" and encourage her to allow penetration. Since there are often many males present and only one male can mate with the female at a time, the success of a male often depends on his persistence and endurance, because physical combat is not a part of the Eunectes mating ritual, apart from firmly pushing against other males in an attempt to secure the best position on the female. In the green anaconda E. murinus, up to 13 males have been observed in a breeding ball, which have been recorded to last two weeks on average.

==== Sexual cannibalism ====
Cannibalism is quite easy in anacondas since females are so much larger than males, but sexual cannibalism has only been confirmed in E. murinus. Females gain the direct benefit of a post-copulatory high-protein meal when they consume their mates, along with the indirect benefit of additional resources to use for the formation of offspring; cannibalism in general (outside of the breeding season) has been confirmed in all but E. deschauenseei, although it is likely that it occurs in all Eunectes species.

==== Asexual reproduction ====
Although sexual reproduction is by far the most common in Eunectes, E. murinus has been observed to undergo facultative parthenogenesis. In both cases, the females had lived in isolation from other anacondas for over eight years, and DNA analysis showed that the few fully formed offspring were genetically identical to the mothers; although this is not commonly observed, it is likely possible in all species of Eunectes and several other species of Boidae.

== Relationship with humans ==
While encounters between people and anacondas may be dangerous, they do not regularly hunt humans. Nevertheless, threat from anacondas is a familiar trope in comics, movies, and adventure stories (often published in pulp magazines or adventure magazines) set in the Amazon jungle. Local communities and some European explorers have given accounts of giant anacondas, legendary snakes of much greater proportion than any confirmed specimen.

Although charismatic, there is little known on the biology of wild anacondas. Most of our knowledge comes from the work of Dr. Jesús A. Rivas and his team working in the Venezuelan Llanos.

=== Indigenous mythology ===
According to the founding myth of the Huni Kuin, a man named Yube fell in love with an anaconda woman and was turned into an anaconda as well. He began to live with her in the deep world of waters. In this world, Yube discovered a hallucinogenic drink with healing powers and access to knowledge. One day, without telling his anaconda wife, Yube decided to return to the land of men and resume his old human form. The myth also explains the origin of cipó or ayahuasca—a hallucinogenic drink taken ritualistically by the Huni Kuin.

== See also ==
- Jaguar, a competitor or predator
