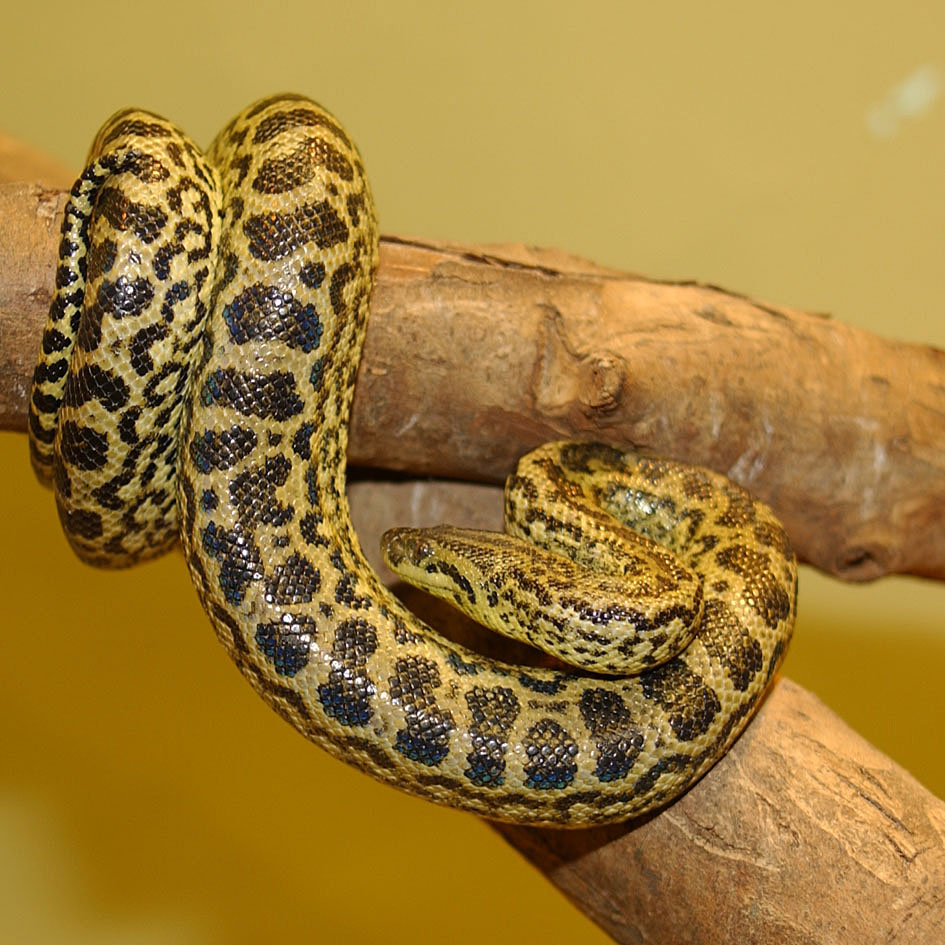

Conservation status
- Least Concern (IUCN 3.1)
- CITES Appendix II

Scientific classification
- Kingdom: Animalia
- Phylum: Chordata
- Class: Reptilia
- Order: Squamata
- Suborder: Serpentes
- Family: Boidae
- Genus: Eunectes
- Species: E. notaeus

Binomial name
- Eunectes notaeus Cope, 1862

Synonyms
- Epicrates wieningeri Steindachner, 1903; Eunectes deschauenseei? Dunn & Conant, 1936; Eunectes beniensis? Dirksen, 2002

= Yellow anaconda =

Species of reptile

The yellow anaconda (Eunectes notaeus), also known as the Paraguayan anaconda, is a boa species endemic to southern South America. It is one of the largest snakes in the world but smaller than its close relative, the green anaconda. No subspecies are currently recognized. Like all boas and pythons, it is non-venomous and kills its prey by constriction.

== Etymology ==
The Neo-Latin specific name notaeus derives from Ancient Greek: νωταίος, romanized: nōtaios, lit. 'dorsal' (νωταίος is a poetic form of νωτιαίος/nōtiaios). In distinguishing his new species Eunectes notaeus from Eunectes murinus, Edward Drinker Cope stated, "Dorsal scales are larger and in fewer rows."

== Description ==
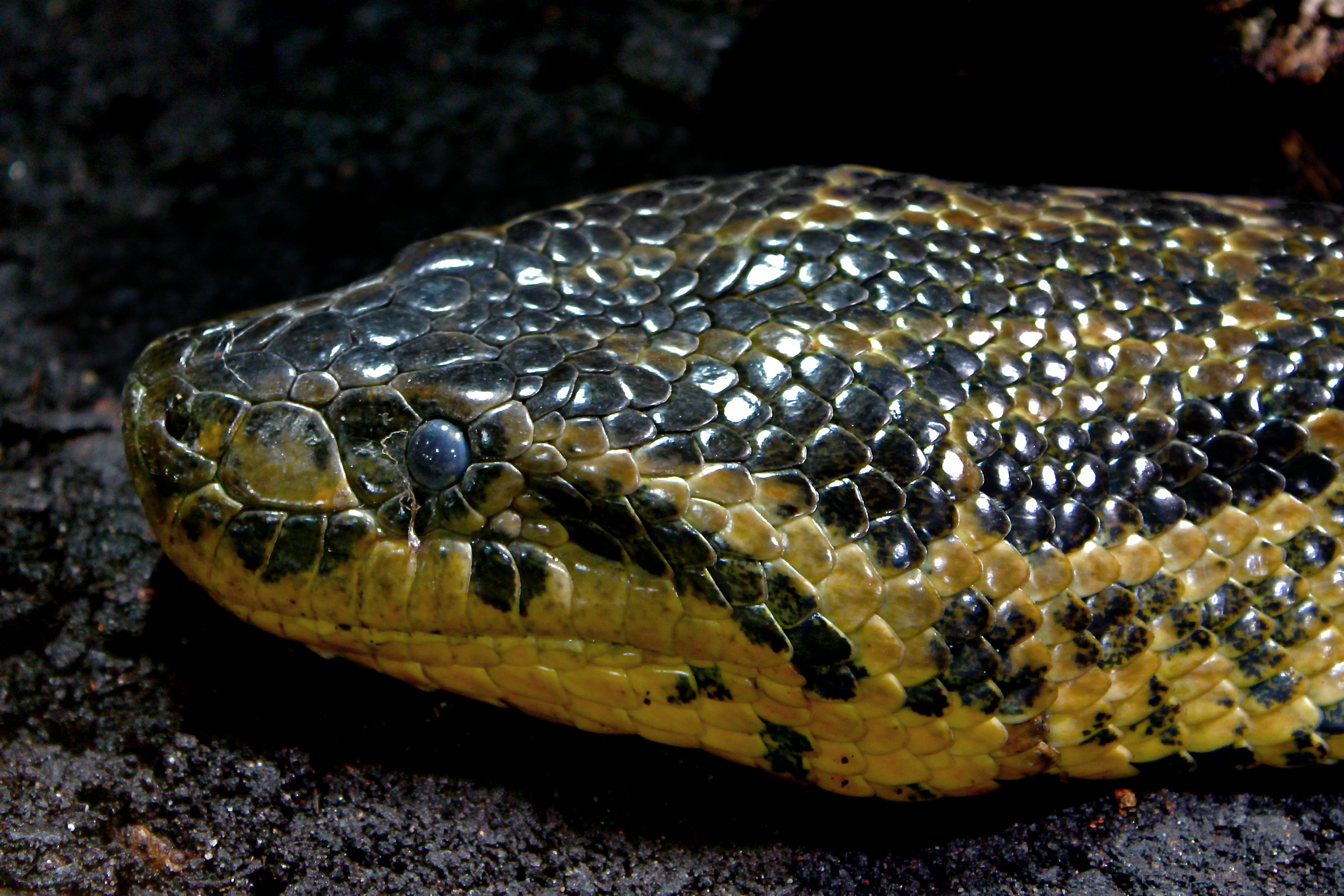
Close-up of head, at the Reptilium Terrarium and Desert Zoo, Landau, Germany

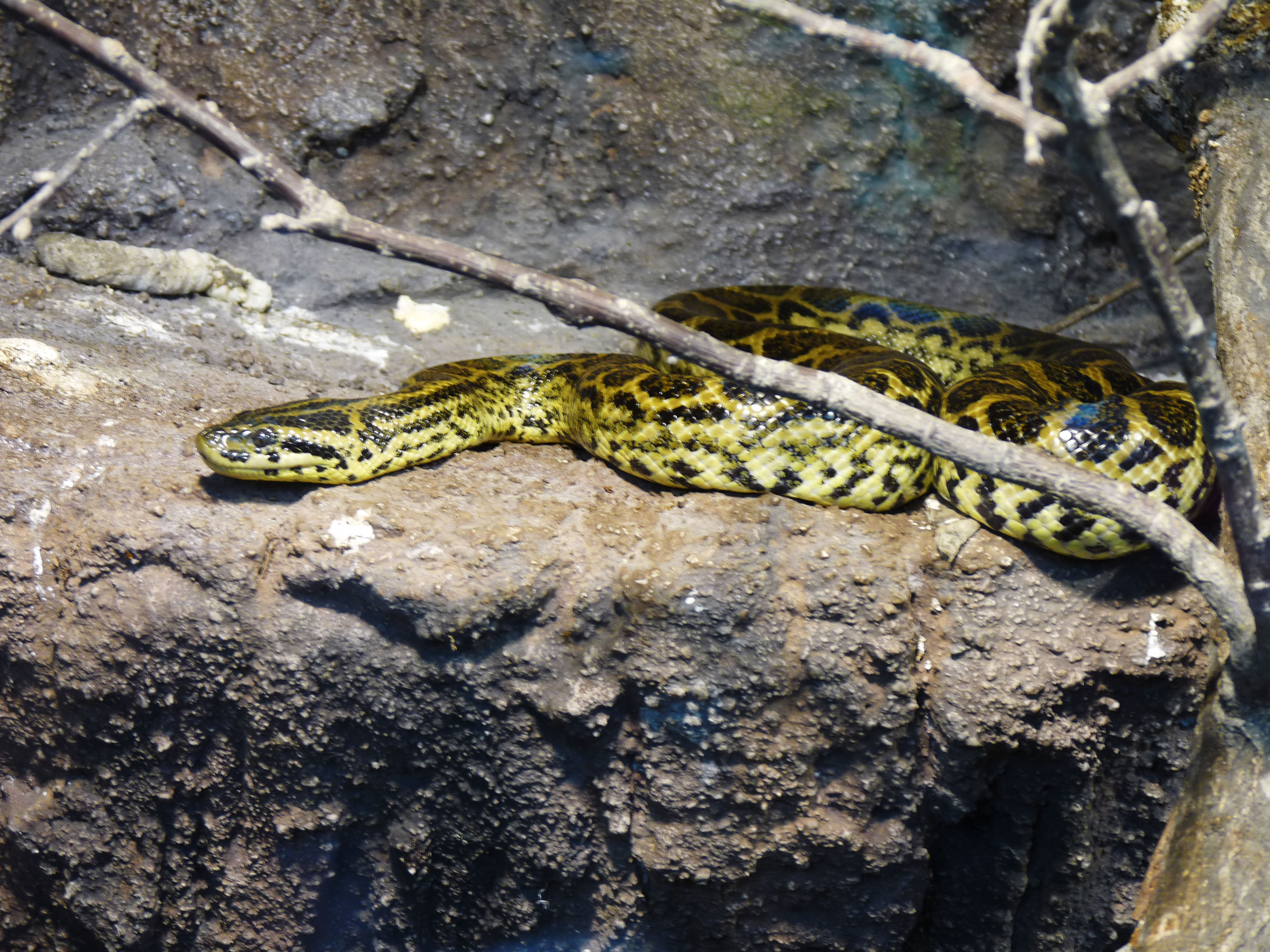
In the Ohrada Zoo, Hluboká nad Vltavou, Czech Republic

Adults grow to an average of 3.7 m (12 ft 1 1/2 in) in total length. Females are generally larger than males and have been reported up to 4.6 m (15 ft 1 in) in length. They commonly weigh 25 to 35 kg (55 to 77 lb), but specimens weighing more than 55 kg (121 lb) have been observed. The color pattern consists of a yellow, golden-tan or greenish-yellow ground color overlaid with a series of black or dark brown saddles, blotches, spots and streaks.

== Distribution and habitat ==
The range of the yellow anaconda encompasses the drainage of the Paraguay River and its tributaries, from the Pantanal region in Bolivia, Paraguay, and western Brazil to northeastern Argentina and northern Uruguay. The anaconda's most suitable habitat occurs mostly in northern Argentina and southern Paraguay. It prefers mostly aquatic habitats, including swamps, marshes, and brush-covered banks of slow-moving rivers and streams. The species appears to have been introduced in Florida, although it is unknown whether the small population (thought to derive from escaped pets) is reproductive.

The taxonomic sinking of Eunectes beniensis and Eunectes deschauenseei into Eunectes notaeus proposed by Rivas et al. (2023) results in this species also being found in western Bolivia (and possibly nearby Brazil), northern Brazil, coastal French Guiana and possibly Suriname.

== Reproduction ==
Yellow anacondas are mostly sequentially monogamous. Males will follow the scent of a female's pheromones in the air to begin courtship which usually happens in the water. Yellow anacondas can form breeding balls which consist of one female and several males at a time. In the breeding ball, the males will fight for access to the female and the largest male typically succeeds. The breeding period for yellow anacondas occurs every year between April and May. The gestation period for female yellow anacondas is 6 months. Females are ovoviviparous, so they will incubate the eggs inside of their body and give birth to live young. The female can give birth anywhere from 4 to 82 young which can be around 60 cm in length. The female leaves the young directly after they are born to fend for themselves. Sexual maturity for yellow anacondas is 3 to 4 years old.

== Ecology ==
The yellow anaconda forages predominantly in shallow water in wetland habitats. Most predation occurs from June to November, when flooding has somewhat subsided and wading birds are the most common prey. Observations and analysis of gut and waste contents from regularly flooded areas in the Pantanal region of southwestern Brazil indicate that they are generalist feeders that employ both ambush predation and wide-foraging strategies.

Their prey consists nearly exclusively of aquatic or semi-aquatic species, including apple snails and a wide variety of mammals, birds, reptiles (such as lizards, turtles, and caimans), fish, carrion, eggs, and possibly amphibians. Larger specimens can prey upon larger animals, such as brocket deer, capybaras or peccaries. The prey-to-predator weight ratio is often much higher than for other types of Boidae. Cannibalism has been observed in this species, though it is not clear how often this occurs.

The yellow anaconda has few predators. Predators of juveniles and the occasional adult include crab-eating foxes, tegu lizards, spectacled caimans, larger anacondas, felids, canids, procyonids, mustelids, herons, and raptors such as the crested caracara. The species is also hunted by humans for its skin.

== Behavior ==
Yellow anacondas are solitary creatures and are only found together during mating season. The anacondas will separate once mating season is over. Most of the yellow anaconda's time is spent in the water to hunt but they may venture on land for mating, to move to other water bodies, or to hunt terrestrial prey. When in the water, yellow anacondas will float on top of the water with their nose poking out of the surface. Yellow anacondas are considered timid snakes and will try to run away from predators but will defend themselves if necessary. The snakes mostly hunt from June to November due to flooding being mostly subsided. There are rare reports of attacks on humans from yellow anacondas. In captivity, yellow anacondas tend to be aggressive and fierce and are hard to tame.

== Interactions with humans ==
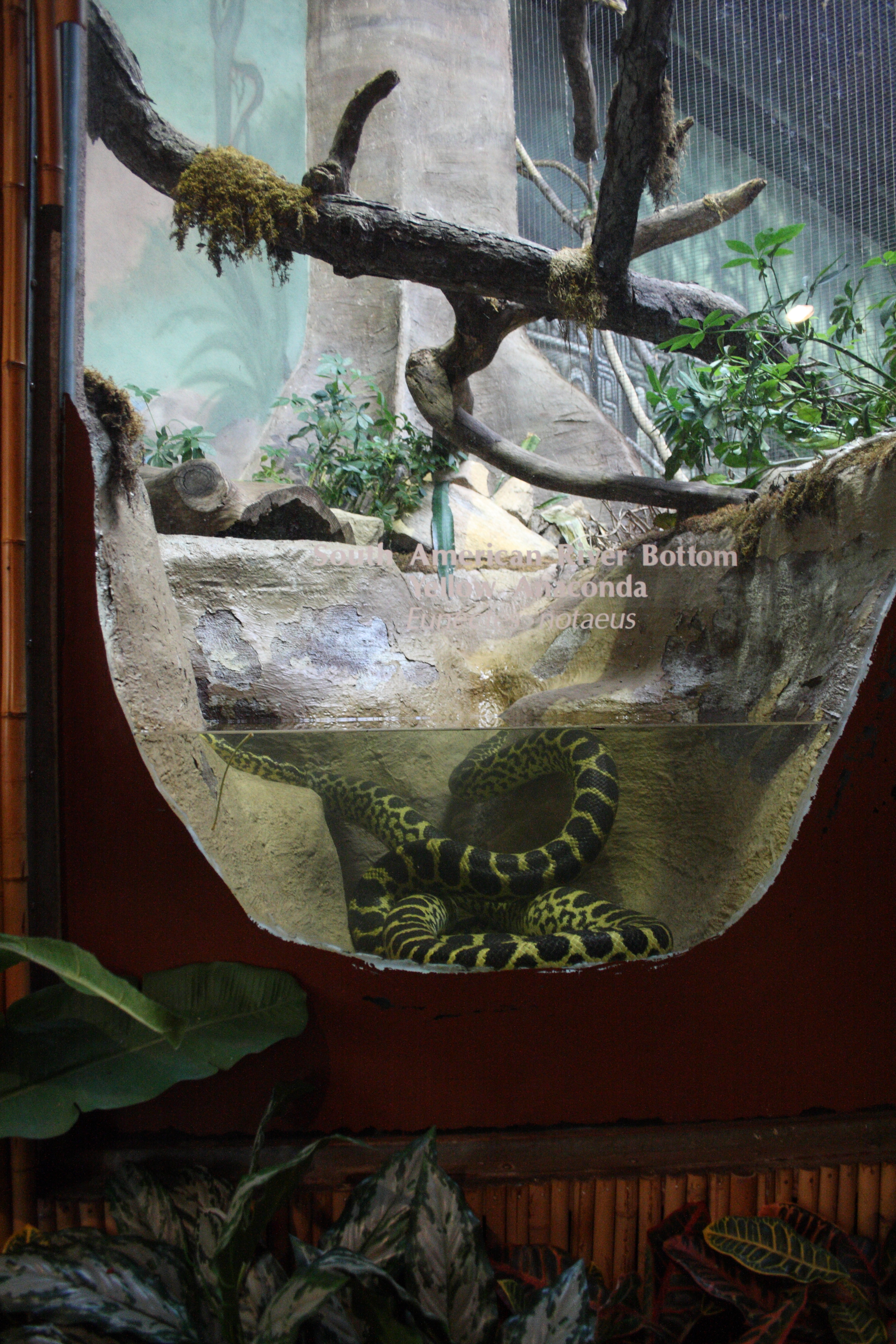
A yellow anaconda in the waterhole, at the Beardsley Zoo, Bridgeport, Connecticut

In captivity, the yellow anaconda has a reputation for being unpredictable and somewhat dangerous to humans, especially when caught from the wild, leading some professionals and keepers to begin efforts at captive-breeding. Yellow anacondas can live from 15 to 25 years and may live even longer in captivity if they are well taken care of. Adult yellow anacondas in captivity are typically fed frozen and thawed rodents about every two to four weeks. The typical cage size for adults is 8 feet x 4 feet x 4 feet and should include the correct substrate, a hide box, and enrichment for the anaconda. The lighting for the enclosure should be on a natural cycle and the temperature should be 31 to 33 degrees Celsius (88 to 92 degrees Fahrenheit) on the warm end and 25 to 27 degrees Celsius (78 to 80 degrees Fahrenheit) on the cool end of the enclosure. The humidity should also be high and there should be a water dish large enough for the anaconda to submerge themselves. If the needs for the yellow anaconda are not met it could result in several problems such as: stress, external parasites, dehydration, dysecdis/shedding problems, internal parasites, and respiratory disease. In the United States, the import, transportation and sale of the species across state lines was banned in 2012 in an attempt to prevent the yellow anaconda from becoming an invasive species in vulnerable natural areas such as the Florida Everglades. The conservation status of the yellow anaconda has not been assessed by the IUCN. From the 1940s to the 1980s, between 10,000 and 60,000 yellow anaconda skins from Argentina were exported to Europe and the United States. The locals hunted the species and sold the skins to dealers and there was no restriction or monitoring for the hunting of the yellow anaconda. In 1986, the hunting and trade of yellow anacondas in Argentina was prohibited by the national government. The species has been regulated by a regional and national conservation and a sustainable use plan since 2001. Due to this process, poaching of the yellow anaconda almost ceases to exist in Argentina. There is still some local hunting allowed but is extremely regulated by the government and this has caused enhanced awareness of the poaching issue.

== See also ==
- List of largest snakes
