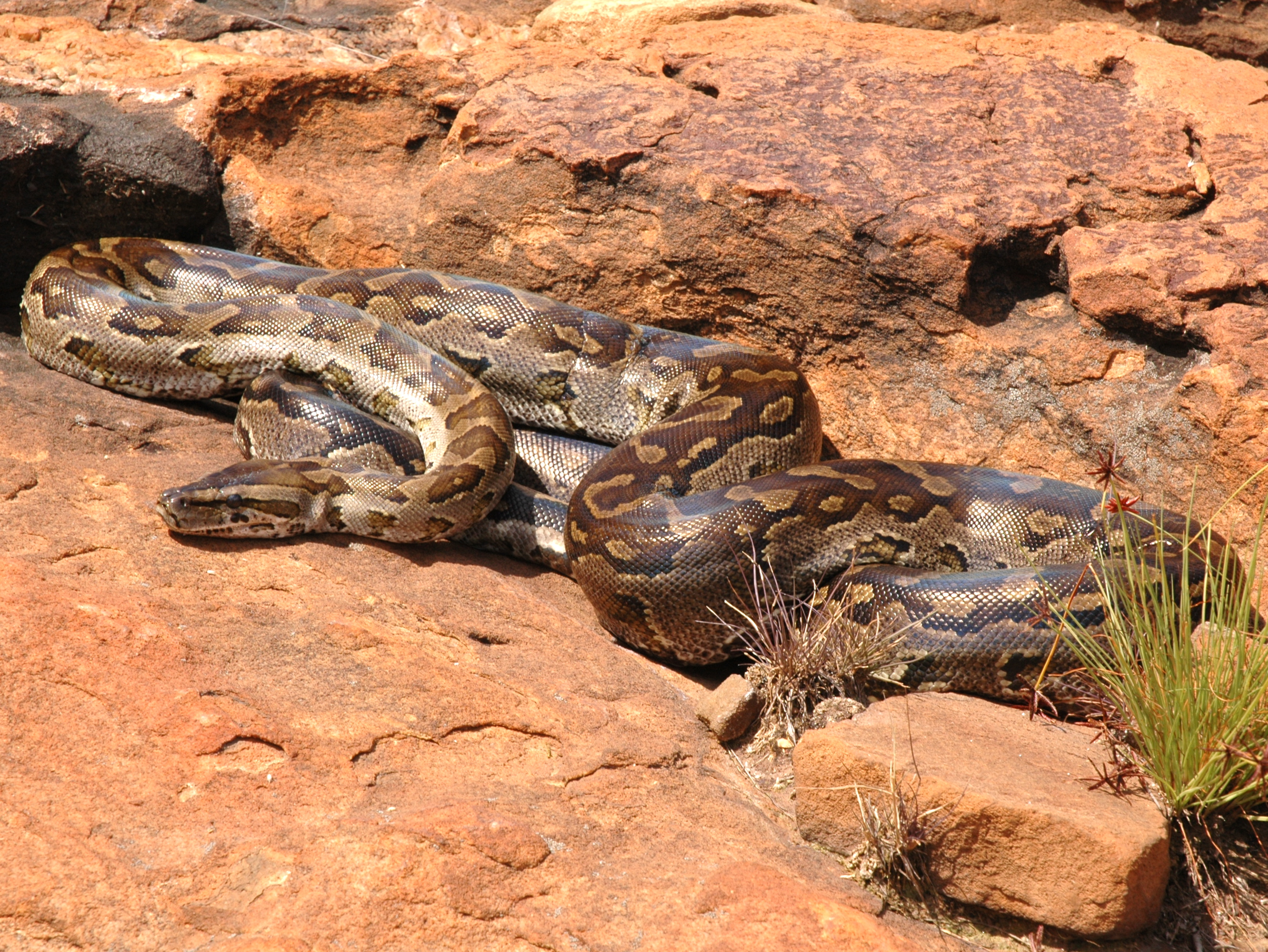

Conservation status
- Least Concern (IUCN 3.1)

Scientific classification
- Kingdom: Animalia
- Phylum: Chordata
- Class: Reptilia
- Order: Squamata
- Suborder: Serpentes
- Family: Pythonidae
- Genus: Python
- Species: P. natalensis

Binomial name
- Python natalensis Smith, 1833
- Range of Southern African rock python Range of Python sebae Range of hybrids

Synonyms
- Python sebae natalensis

= Southern African rock python =

Species or subspecies of python

The Southern African rock python (Python natalensis) is a large python species native to Southern Africa inhabiting savanna and woodland. It was first described by Andrew Smith in 1833. Growing a length of more than 5 m (16 ft), this is one of the largest snakes in the world.

== Description ==
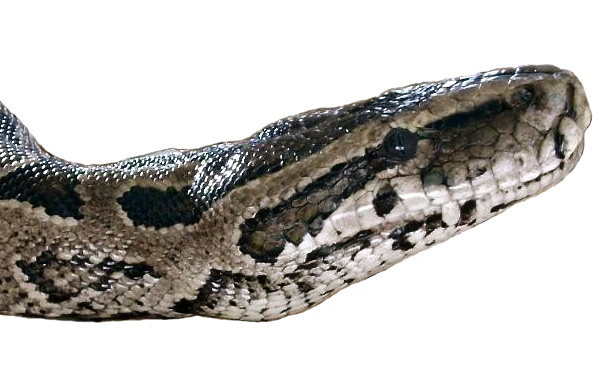
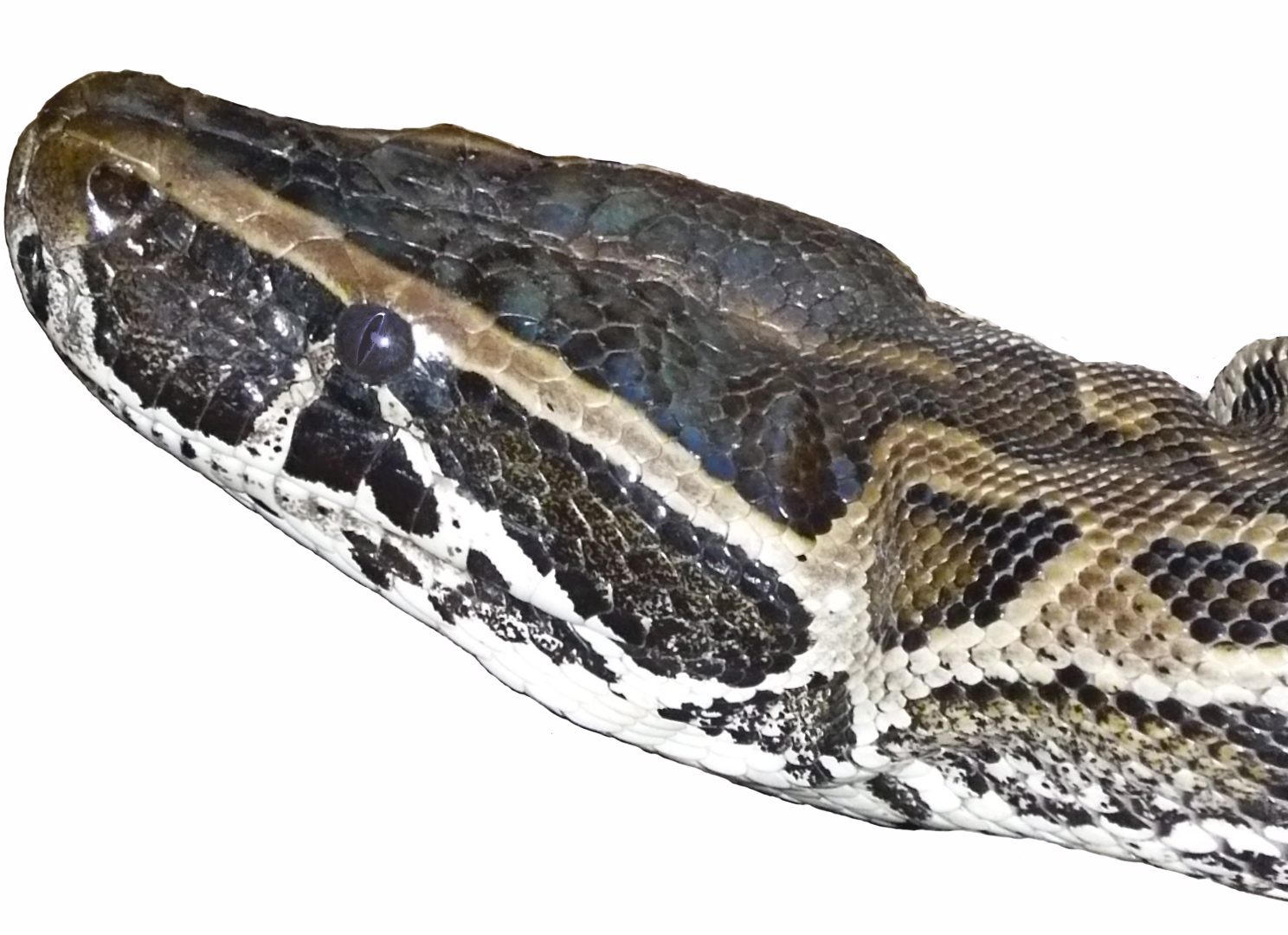
Cephalic features of the Southern African rock python (top) and the Central African rock python (Python sebae) on the bottom

The Southern African rock python has a colouration that is similar to its northern relative, however it is described as being "drabber". Below the light stripe on both snakes' head, the southern species has a narrower dark patch that resembles a stripe instead of a patch. The Central African rock python (Python sebae) has two prominent light lines from the nose, over the eye to the back of the head, which are much duller in the Southern African rock python. The northern species has considerably larger head scales. It is also noticeably inferior in size to size the Central African rock python.

=== Size ===
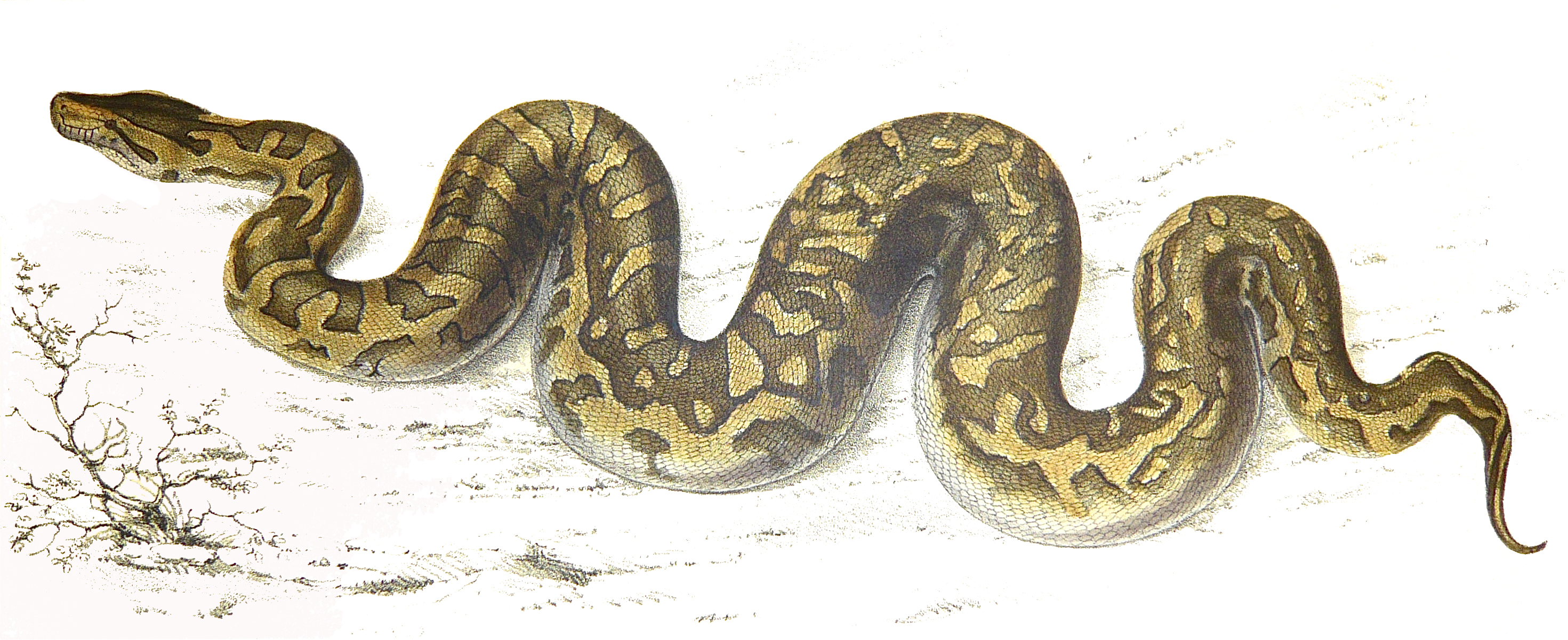
A 1840 drawing of the Southern African rock python by Sir Andrew Smith

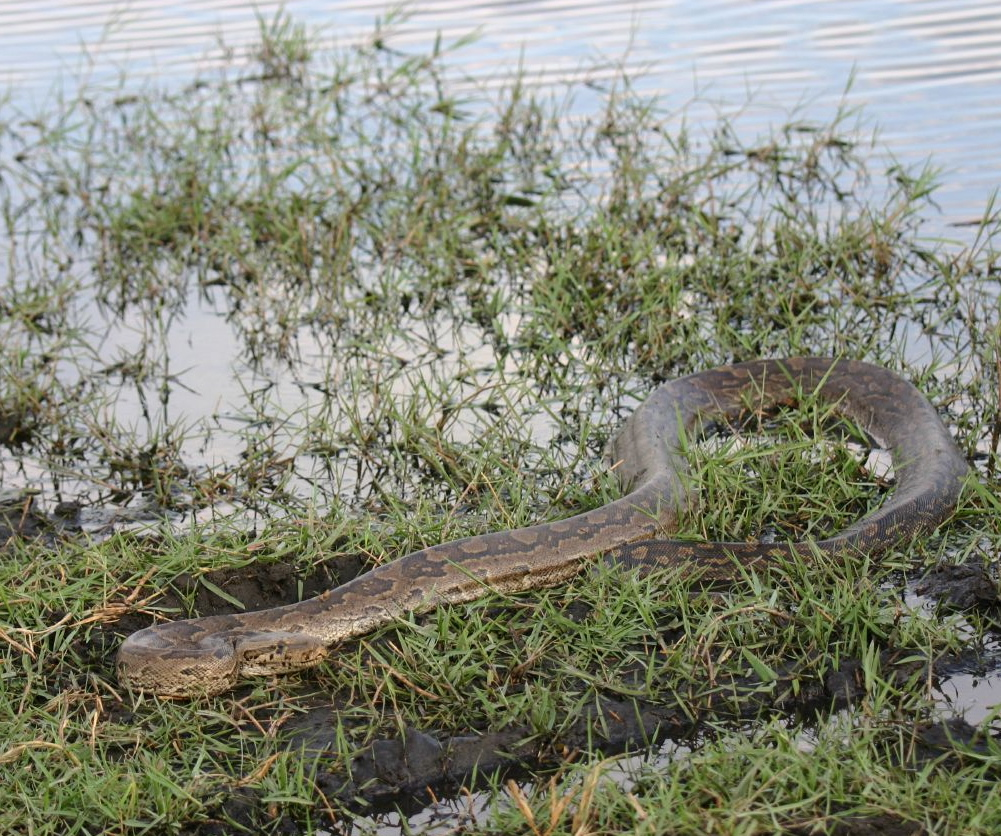
Southern African rock python edge Cuando River, Botswana

The Southern African rock python reaches an average length of between 2.8 and 4 m (9 ft 2 in and 13 ft 1 in). Individuals longer than 4.6 m (15 ft) are rare. Regarding body length and mass, this species exhibits sexual dimorphism, as females are significantly larger and heavier than males. Of 75 individuals measured in South Africa the longest female was 4.34 m (14.2 ft) long and weighed 53.4 kg (118 lb). The largest male was 4.23 m (13.9 ft) long and weighed 31.1 kg (69 lb). There is one reliable record of a living specimen reaching 5.56 m (18.2 ft). The longest South African python measured 5.8 m (19 ft), recorded in the former Transvaal. One specimen, reportedly 7 m (23 ft 0 in) in length, was killed by K. H. Kroff in Zambia in 1958 and was claimed to have had a 1.5 m (4 ft 11 in) juvenile Nile crocodile in its stomach.

== Behavior and ecology ==
=== Feeding ===
The Southern African rock python mainly feeds on small antelopes, jackals, hares, monkeys, and occasionally fish and crocodiles.

=== Reproduction ===
The female can produce 30-60 eggs and in some cases over 100 eggs. Juveniles measure 50-70 cm in length. Females incubate the eggs, and after hatching may care for the juveniles for 2 weeks or longer. Individuals can turn almost entirley black during the 6-months breeding cycle; this "facultative melanism" may be connected with faster heat retention during sun basking, and has not been documented for any other snake species.

== In culture ==
In Where Men Still Dream, the South African journalist and author Lawrence G. Green speculates that the legend of the Grootslang, a mythical being in South African prospector folklore resembling a giant serpent and said to live in the Orange River, most likely originated from sightings of unusually large rock pythons in the river, which were exaggerated into descriptions of a monstrous being.

== See also ==
- List of largest snakes
