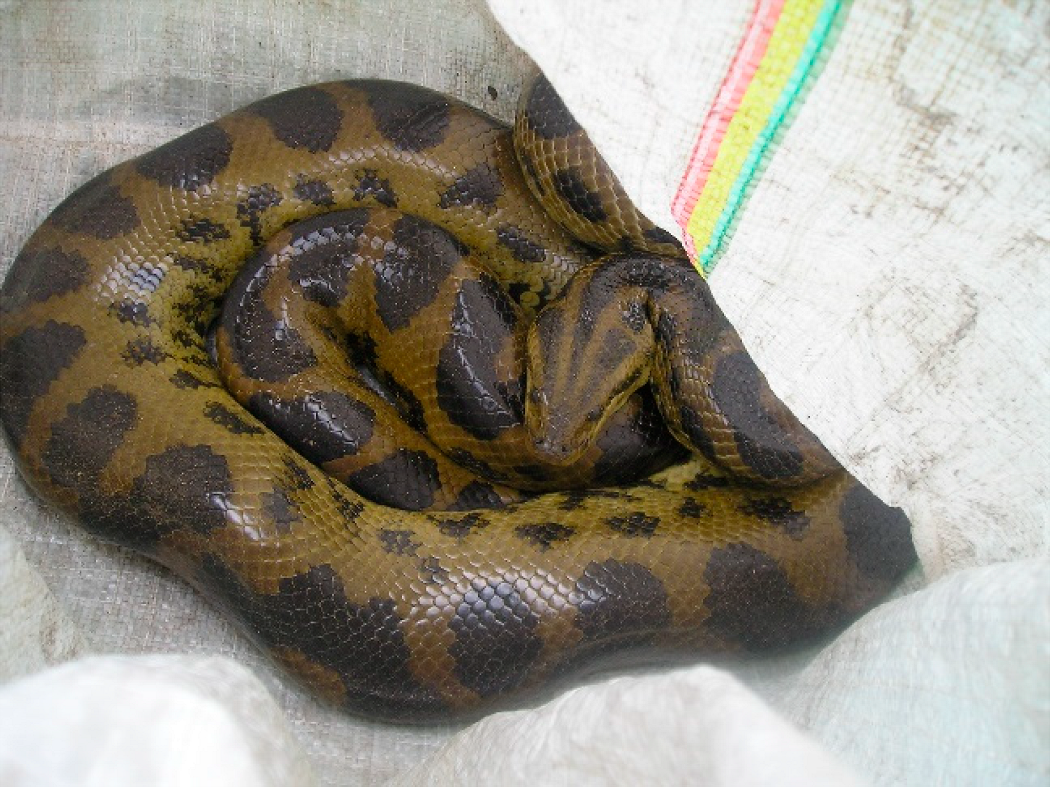
- Dark-spotted anaconda in Beni, Bolivia

Conservation status
- Least Concern (IUCN 3.1)
- CITES Appendix II

Scientific classification
- Kingdom: Animalia
- Phylum: Chordata
- Class: Reptilia
- Order: Squamata
- Suborder: Serpentes
- Family: Boidae
- Genus: Eunectes
- Species: E. deschauenseei

Binomial name
- Eunectes deschauenseei Dunn & Conant, 1936
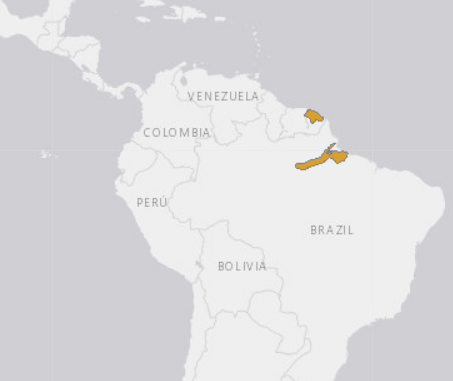
- Natural range of E. deschauenseei

= Eunectes deschauenseei =

Species of snake

Eunectes deschauenseei, commonly known as the dark-spotted anaconda or De Schauensee's anaconda, is a species of snake in the subfamily Boinae of the family Boidae. The species is native to northeastern South America. Like all boas, it kills its prey by constriction (Eunectes deschauenseei mainly eats fish, birds and occasionally mammals). No subspecies are currently recognized.

== Taxonomy ==
The specific name, deschauenseei, is in honor of American ornithologist Rodolphe Meyer de Schauensee, who donated a specimen to the Philadelphia Zoo in 1924. The type locality given is "probably collected on the island of Marajo at the mouth of the Amazon".

== Distribution and habitat ==
Eunectes deschauenseei is found in South America, in northern Brazil (the Pará and Amapá states), French Guiana and possibly Suriname. E. deschauenseei is a nocturnal semi-aquatic species usually found in swampy, seasonally flooded freshwater areas at elevations below 300 m (980 ft).

== Description ==
Adult males of E. deschauenseei measure 130–211 cm (51–83 in) and adult females 120–231 cm (47–91 in) in snout-to-vent length (SVL).

== Reproduction ==
Vitellogenesis in E. deschauenseei probably occurs from autumn to spring (May to December). Gestation may last as long as nine months. Litter size among five gravid females ranged from 3 to 27 (mean 10.6). Newborns measure 29–53 cm (11–21 in) in snout–vent length.

== Conservation ==
The savanna habitat of E. deschauenseei is highly threatened by agricultural expansion, but the threat posed on this species is not known.

== See also ==
- List of largest snakes
