= Andhari =

Andhari may refer to:

- Andhari, Siddhicharan, a village in Nepal
- Andhari, Vikramgad, a village in Maharashtra, India
- Andhari wildlife sanctuary in Maharashtra, India
- Andhari river flowing through Tadoba Andhari Tiger Project in Maharashtra, India
- Andhari, West Singhbhum, a village in Jharkhand, India
