= Invasion of the Giant Pythons: Florida with Nigel Marven =

Invasion of the Giant Pythons: Florida with Nigel Marven is one-hour nature documentary which premiered in 2009 on Channel 5. It was later broadcast as Giant Pythons with Nigel Marven on Animal Planet in the United Kingdom. Presented by Nigel Marven, the film takes a look at Burmese pythons invasion in Florida.

The snakes, originally from southeast Asia, escape from pet shops due to hurricanes or they are released into the wild of Florida by irresponsible keepers. The documentary also shows how Florida's native wildlife deals with this problem. Additionally, Nigel Marven meets a group of scientists studying and catching Burmese pythons in Florida.

The film aired in the USA in 2010 under the title Invasion of the Giant Pythons as a part of the PBS series Nature. In this version, Nigel Marven does not present and narrate the film, instead the narrator is F. Murray Abraham.

== See also ==
- Florida Python Challenge
- The Python Hunt
