= The Python Hunt =

2025 American documentary film

- Theatrical release poster
- Directed by: Xander Robin
- Produced by: Xander Robin; Lance Oppenheim; Mel Oppenheim; Lauren Cioffi
- Cinematography: David Bolen; Matt Clegg
- Edited by: Max Allman
- Music by: Nick León
- Production companies: Artists Equity; To Be Formed
- Distributed by: Oscilloscope Laboratories
- Release dates: March 8, 2025 (SXSW); May 8, 2026
- Running time: 91 minutes
- Country: United States
- Language: English
- Box office: $93,589

The Python Hunt is a 2025 American documentary film, directed and produced by Xander Robin. It follows a group of hunters competing in an invasive python removal contest in the Everglades, over the course of ten nights.

It had its world premiere at the South by Southwest Film & TV Festival on March 8, 2025. It was released on May 8, 2026, by Oscilloscope Laboratories.

== Premise ==
Every year, the Florida government invites the public to participate in a competitive invasive python removal contest.

== Production ==
Lance Oppenheim approached Xander Robin about making a documentary revolving around the Python Hunt competition. Artists Equity produced and financed the film.

== Release ==
It had its world premiere at the South by Southwest Film & TV Festival on March 8, 2025, where it won the Documentary Feature Competition Special Jury Award. It also screened at the Miami Film Festival on April 9, 2025, where it won the Made in MIA Feature Film Award. In October 2025, Oscilloscope Laboratories acquired distribution rights to the film. It was released on May 8, 2026.

== Reception ==
On the review aggregator website Rotten Tomatoes, 95% of 22 critics' reviews are positive, with an average rating of 6.8/10.

== See also ==
- Burmese pythons in Florida
- Florida Python Challenge
- Invasion of the Giant Pythons: Florida with Nigel Marven
