= Burmese pythons in Florida =

Invasive species in the US state of Florida

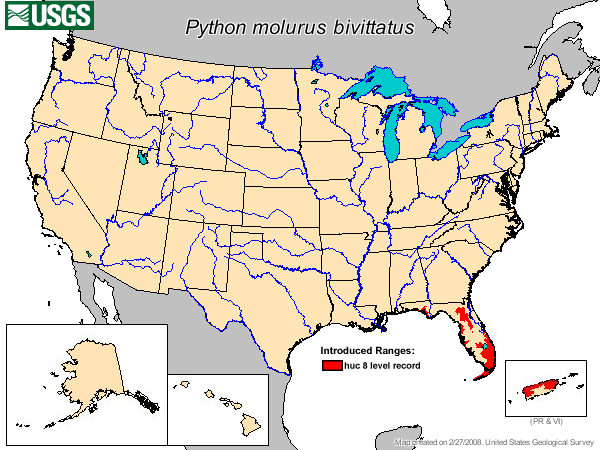
Range of Burmese pythons in 2007

Burmese pythons (Python bivittatus) are native to Southeast Asia. However, since the end of the 20th century, they have become an established breeding population in South Florida. The earliest python sightings in Florida date back to the 1930s, and although Burmese pythons were first sighted in Everglades National Park in the 1990s, they were not officially recognized as a reproducing population until 2000. Since then, the number of python sightings has exponentially increased, with over 30,000 sightings from 2008 to 2010.

Burmese pythons prey on a wide variety of birds, mammals, and crocodilians in the Everglades. Pronounced declines in several mammalian species have coincided spatially and temporally with the proliferation of pythons in South Florida, indicating the already devastating impacts upon native animals. The importation of Burmese pythons was banned in the United States in January 2012 by the U.S. Department of the Interior.

== Introduction ==
Burmese pythons were introduced to Florida in the 1970s as part of the exotic pet trade. Many owners who found it challenging to care for these snakes released them into the wild. In 1992, Hurricane Andrew destroyed a python breeding center. The resulting release of hundreds more snakes was said to have contributed to the population, though research shows that the population is more likely to have been established in other areas, more likely by breeding of a small number of founding specimens, most likely former pets.

== Invasive impact ==
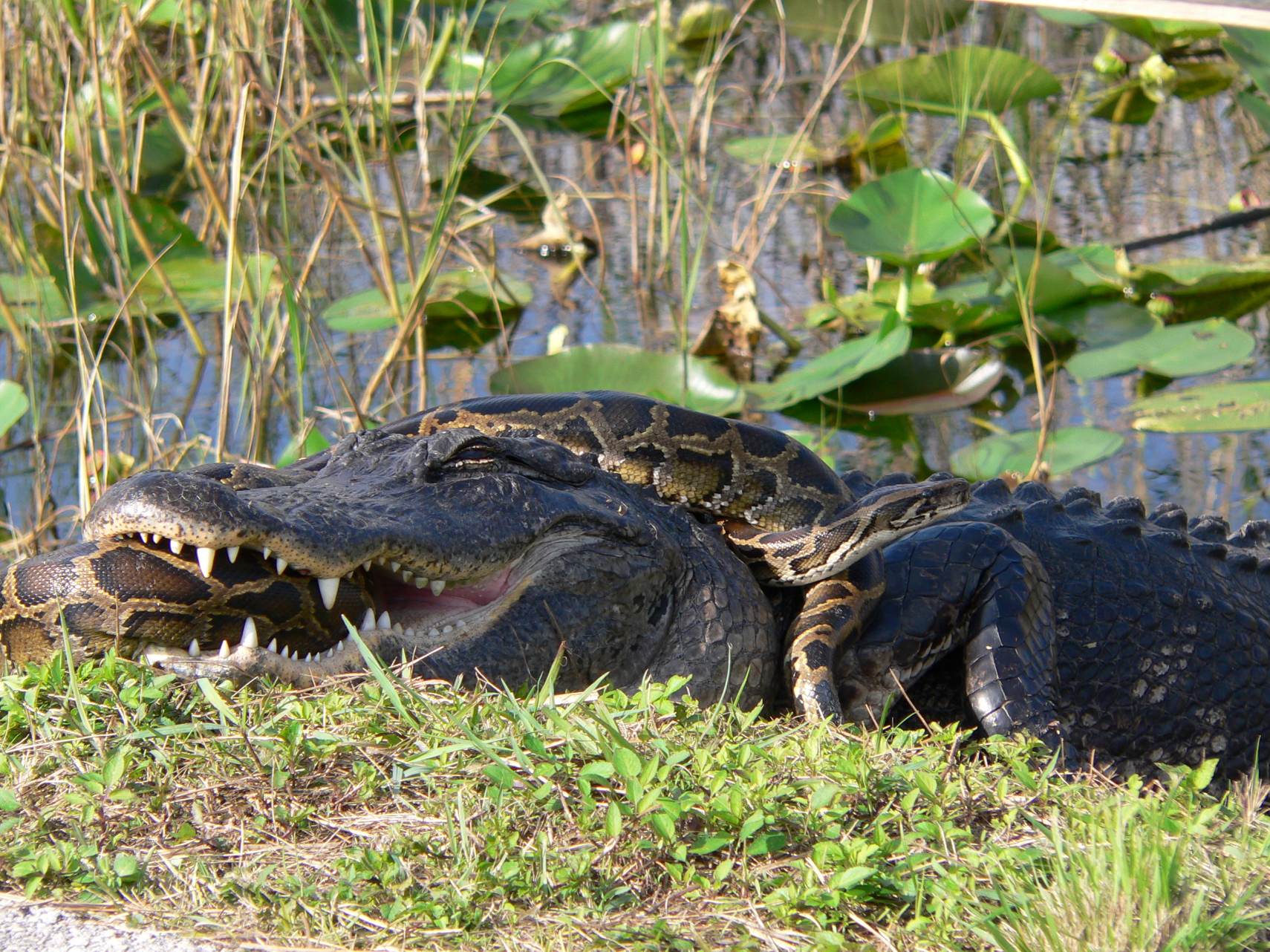
An American alligator and a Burmese python in Everglades National Park struggling in lock

Burmese pythons in the state of Florida are classified as an invasive species. They disrupt the ecosystem by preying on native species, outcompeting them for food or other resources, and/or altering the physical environment. They are comparable in size or even larger than adult native snake species and quickly reach sizes that reduce their vulnerability to predation. The native American alligator is known to be prey, a predator, and a competitor of the serpent, depending on the size of the individuals. Bobcats and vultures have been observed raiding python nests for eggs.

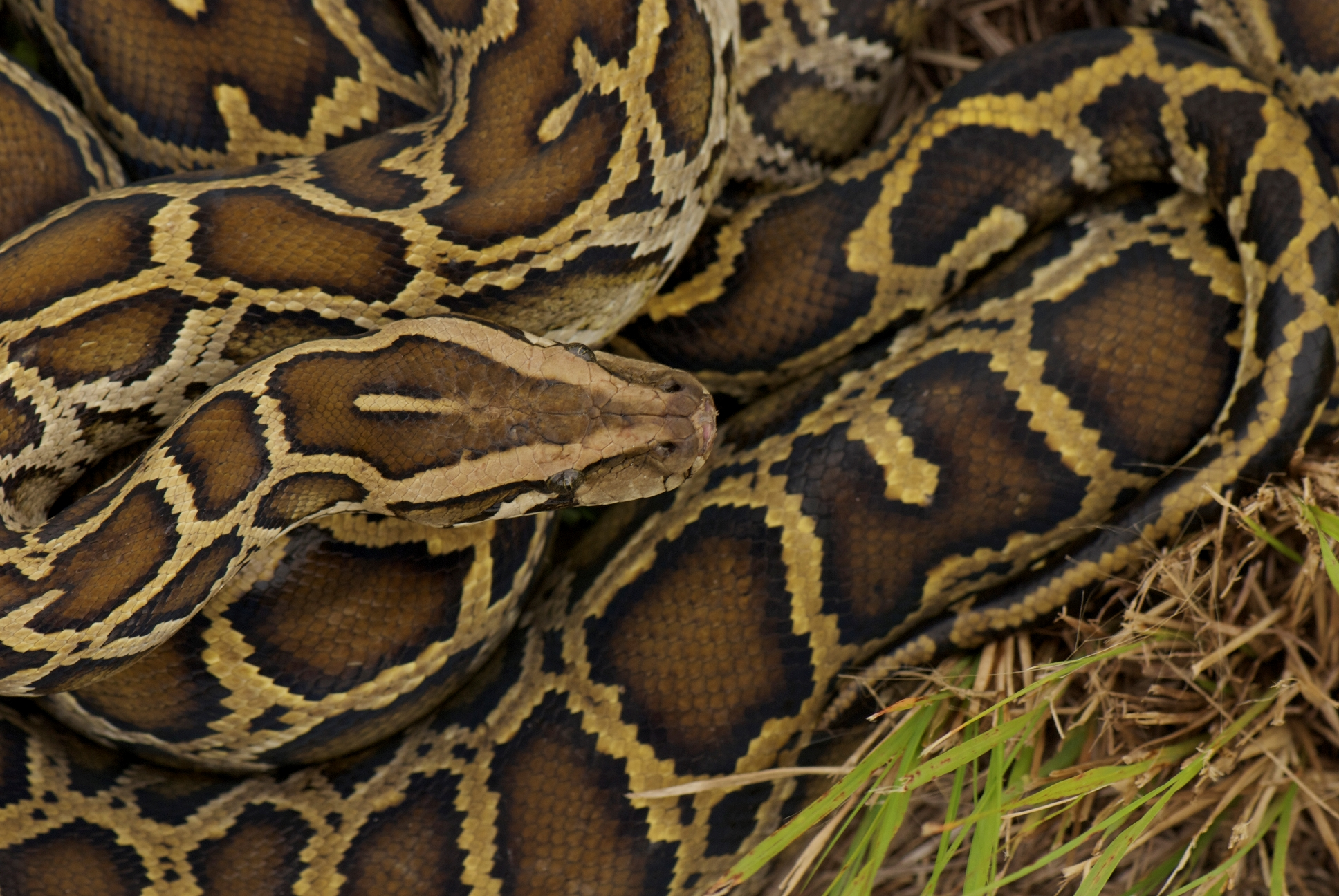
Burmese python coiled in the grass in the Everglades

The high reproductive potential, rapid sexual development, and longevity of Burmese pythons make it difficult to control the population by removing individuals. A typical female breeds every other year, produces a clutch of between 20 and 50 eggs, and can live for 20 years or more.

Additionally, as predators and dietary generalists, Burmese pythons target a wide array of taxonomic groups. Thus, they are not dependent upon a specific prey species. The flexible dietary requirements of Burmese pythons enable them to survive for long periods of time without food, but when prey is readily available, they will eat regularly.

Severe declines in mammalian populations across the Everglades may be tied to the proliferation of pythons. Comparisons of road surveys conducted in 1996–1997 (before proliferation) and 2003–2011 (after proliferation) indicated alarming declines in the frequency of raccoon, opossum, bobcat, rabbit, fox, and other mammalian species sightings, but the validity of the findings and specific numbers has been questioned due to methodological inconsistencies. Nonetheless, declines were also observed where pythons were only recently documented, and the greatest mammalian abundances were observed outside of the python's current range. Burmese pythons were the dominant predator of reintroduced marsh rabbits (Sylvilagus palustris) in Everglades National Park, and predation by pythons extirpated the rabbit population in less than 11 months.

=== In the Everglades ===
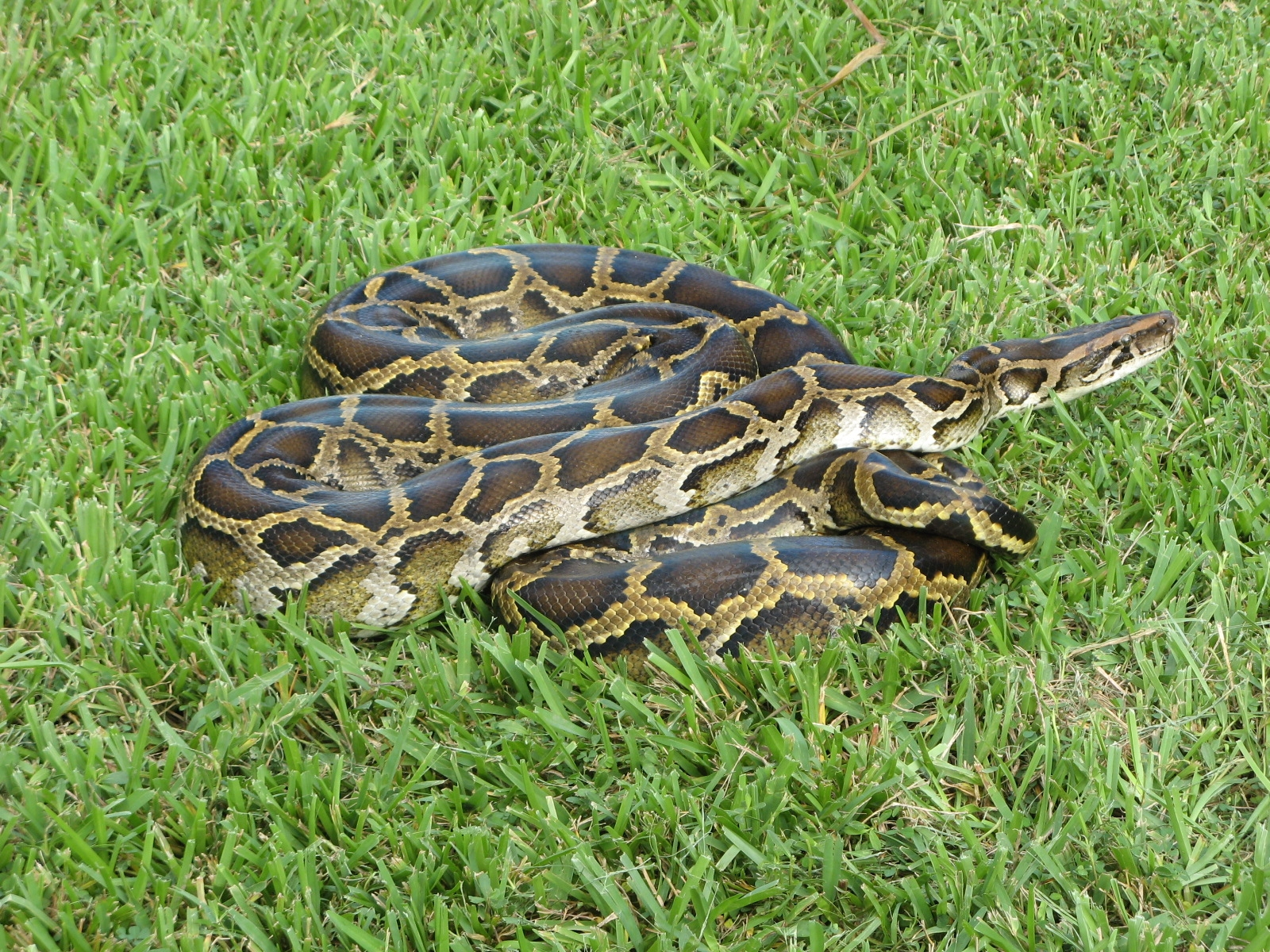
A Burmese python captured in Everglades National Park

The Everglades is a region of tropical wetlands comprising the lower third of the Florida peninsula. Only 25% of the original Everglades remains, protected within Everglades National Park. The climate of South Florida and the location of the Everglades, surrounded by a metropolitan area to the east, Naples to the west, and Florida Bay to the south, make it particularly vulnerable to infestations of exotic species. Miami, in particular, is the hub for the exotic pet trade in the United States. Although the exact origin of Burmese pythons in the Everglades is unknown, likely, many were once pets released by owners who found them too difficult to care for. However, the majority of experts concur that the python population grew particularly after Hurricane Andrew. The category 5 storm destroyed a python breeding facility, which released numerous snakes into the adjacent swamps. An evaluation of the genetic structure of Burmese pythons sampled from Everglades National Park determined that the population is genetically distinct from pythons sampled in their native range. Still, within the Everglades population, there is little genetic diversity.

In 2001, the United States Geological Survey began a 10-year period analysis of 400 pythons captured in the Everglades. The survey discovered that there existed a tangled genetic tree between these captured snakes, and that hybrid pythons were manifesting within the Everglades. Thirteen out of the 400 pythons analyzed had genetic signatures of the Indian rock python within their DNA. Indian rock pythons are a smaller and faster species than the Burmese python.

Estimating the population of Burmese pythons in the Everglades is challenging due to the species' secretive nature and the limited ability to conduct traditional mark-recapture assessments. Namely, it is counterintuitive to the primary goal of python removal to return captured pythons to the wild.

Furthermore, the low detectability of pythons means that even if mark-recapture studies could be conducted, they would require more research effort than is currently feasible. Pythons spend the majority of their day in hiding, whether in burrows or aquatic habitats. One study indicated that even seasoned herpetologists showed only a 1% efficacy in detecting pythons housed in a seminatural environment. Consequently, estimates of python populations range from at least 30,000 to more than 300,000.

=== Spatial ecology ===
Several attempts have been made at better understanding the spatial ecology of Burmese pythons in the Everglades, including capture analysis and radio telemetry studies. Since the recognition of the breeding population of pythons, researchers have made an effort to note the capture history (date, location, and time) as well as characteristics (mass, length, sex, reproduction condition, and gut contents) of each animal to better characterize the python's activity patterns, spread, and ecology. More than 2,000 pythons have been captured since 2005, including hatchling pythons, gravid females, and adults in excess of 17 ft 6 in (5.3 m) in total length. Gut analyses indicate that captured pythons consume nearly any bird, mammal, or alligator found in the Everglades, including nationally endangered Key Largo woodrats (Neotoma floridana smalli) and wood storks (Mycteria americana).

Radio telemetry involves the use of small, surgically implanted radiotransmitters to track the movement patterns of captured and released animals over extended periods. A 2014 study suggests that Burmese pythons have navigational map and compass senses. In contrast to previous research that documented the poor navigational abilities of terrestrial snakes, the movement behavior of the Burmese python seems to be nonrandom. The movements of 12 adult Burmese pythons in Everglades National Park were tracked following their translocation from their initial locations. Five of the six snakes that were displaced 21–36 kilometres (13–22 mi) from their capture sites exhibited oriented movement, returning to within 5 kilometres (3 mi) of their original locations. This homing ability of the Burmese python is therefore an additional factor that must be considered in predictions of the future range of the python within the southern US and the management of the current population within South Florida.

They have carried Raillietiella orientalis (a pentastome parasitic disease) with them from SE Asia. Other reptiles in Florida have become infested, and the parasite appears to have become endemic.

== Risk assessment ==
One of the most contentious issues related to the Burmese python population in Florida is the potential spread to other areas of the southern United States. A potential limitation to a species's habitat range is climate. In February 2008, USGS scientists published a projected range map for the US, based on average climate data of the snake's home range and global warming projections, which predicted that by the end of the 21st century, these snakes could migrate to and flourish in as much as a third of the continental United States, including three of the country's coasts. Numerous climate matching models have indicated that most of Florida and vast portions of the coast of the rest of the Southeastern United States provide hospitable habitats for Burmese pythons. The original model takes into account only the fundamental climate space of the python and thus disregards other factors that could limit python spread. Furthermore, most of the data set was obtained from localities outside of the Burmese python's native range.

However, a subsequent study produced a map incorporating both climatic extremes and averages which projected that the Burmese python's range as limited to southern Florida and extreme south Texas, though this projection was criticized in an unsigned Axcess News article as not having been peer-reviewed. Burmese pythons kept throughout winter in an experimental enclosure in South Carolina all died during the study, apparently because they could not properly acclimate to the cold. Still, most survived extended periods at temperatures below those typical of southern Florida. The report concluded, "Regarding areas of putative suitability and potential expansion within the United States, we find, remarkably, that the area in which the snakes are known to have colonized (south Florida) is essentially the only region where the climatic conditions are suitable for the pythons. Almost no potential for further continental expansion is predicted based on the results from the ecological niche models."

In contrast to the 2009 proposal, the more conservative niche model identifies regions of suitable climate in South Florida, extreme southern Texas, and spotty areas across the Central and Southern Americas. However, the use of this model has been criticized for the overfitting of data from excess variables and the misidentification of four Blood pythons as Burmese pythons. A model corrected for these miscalculations showed a greater projected range of Burmese python climate match, including nearly all of Florida, much of the lower Coastal Plain of the southeast United States, and southern Texas.

A severe freeze in the southeastern United States during January 2010 provided additional insight into the threat of Burmese python range extension. In the wake of this extended cold spell, several investigators reported dead snakes coiled along canal banks and in outdoor enclosures. However, numerous snakes survived this cold spell, potentially by using behavioral mechanisms (such as seeking refuge underground). If these behavioral traits are heritable, the winter of 2009–2010 may have acted as a selective event favoring more cold-tolerant pythons. This selected population of pythons would have an enhanced ability to spread northwards and extend the python's invasive range. In addition to behavioral traits, a study in 2018 showed that the surviving pythons showed evidence of:

directional selection in genomic regions enriched for genes associated with thermosensation, behavior, and physiology...several of these genes are linked to regenerative organ growth; this adaptive response that modulates organ size and function with feeding and fasting in pythons.

If these traits continue to be passed on then they would enable pythons to continue digestion during colder periods of time, which would be useful in geographic regions further north.

Data published in 2012 contradict the initial USGS study which claimed that non-native Burmese pythons could expand as far north as the southern third of the United States. The Burmese python will remain in the Everglades. Furthermore, other reputable herpetologists have commented on the controversial theory positing future migration past the Florida Everglades. The National Geographic Society's resident herpetologist, Dr. Brady Barr, said, "Climate data reveal that temperatures found in southern Florida simply are not conducive to the long-term survival of large tropical snakes. When it gets cold, these snakes die." Dr. Barr also said, "Feral hogs are a bigger problem for the Everglades than pythons. The press has sensationalized this story to the point that people think the sky is falling. Hopefully, comprehensive research such as Jacobson et al. will put an end to the hysteria."

== Control ==
In science, it is debated whether removal of snakes from the population will decrease population size, or, via lowering predation competition, would lead to population size staying stable or even increasing. Nonetheless, several methods of removal have been considered in the Everglades, ranging from trapping efforts to bounty hunters, dog teams, to proposed biocontrol methods via the reintroduction of locally extinct predators. Such methods have been proposed to control the thriving Burmese python population in Florida because much of the python's introduced range includes areas inaccessible to humans, making specimens even harder to detect. Control efforts have met with little success, although the population size remains unknown.

The use of bounty hunters has received considerable support from officials and media beyond the scientific community. Although the results have not been significant, given the high estimates of python populations, these efforts have increased awareness of the problem. The 2013 Florida Python Challenge, a month-long event with cash incentives for python removals sponsored by the Florida Fish and Wildlife Conservation Commission, resulted in only 68 total pythons removed by 1,600 registered participants. Another hunt was nonetheless held in 2016, resulting in 106 pythons removed by over 1,000 participants. The challenge returned in 2020 and has since been an annual event over the duration of ten days. In 2023, it resulted in 209 pythons removed by 1,050 participants.

In 2017, the Florida Water Management District created a permanent team of 50 contracted bounty hunters working alongside another 50 contractors employed under the Florida Fish and Wildlife Conservation Commission. In July 2020, the South Florida Water Management District and the Florida Fish and Wildlife Conservation Commission announced that the 5,000th python had been removed from the Everglades.

Some participants in the state-sponsored hunts have had snakeskin products made from the carcasses, but hunting the animals for food is not recommended, as many top level predators of the Everglades have dangerously high levels of mercury through bioaccumulation, the pythons being no exception. Environmental chemist Dr. David Krabbenhoft of the U.S. Geological Survey tested tissue samples from a collection of frozen python tails maintained by scientists at Everglades National Park. Analysis of more than 50 samples yielded mercury concentrations up to 3.5 ppm. The state of Florida considers fish containing more than 1.5 ppm of mercury unsafe to eat. However as of December 2020 the FWC is studying mercury levels again to make recommendations about what size, age, and location of origin might be safe to eat. The eggs are edible.

Numerous people have suggested using dogs to detect pythons in the Everglades. A 2011 assessment of detection dogs for python removal found that the success of dog search teams (73%) was not significantly greater than that of human search teams (69%) in controlled plot searches. Thick vegetation, which can both reduce visibility and hold odors, limited the efficacy of both human and dog searchers within the plots. However, the dog search team was significantly more successful in canal searches (92%) and could cover three times the distance of human searchers. Despite the potential of dog search teams to detect free-ranging pythons, several impracticalities prevent the widespread use of dog search teams, including the danger posed to released dogs in the Everglades, limited efficacy of chemoreceptive cues in the shallow waters of the Everglades, and extensive limestone substrate that would hinder movement. The greater cost of a dog search team as compared to human searchers is an additional consideration. In the second week of December 2020, this program had its first success.

The Burmese python poses challenges to trapping efforts. Trapping, a traditional method of snake capture, can include both a device with an inescapable funnel and a drift fence that directs snakes towards the trap. Drift fences must be inserted several inches into the ground to ensure snakes cannot bypass them. Still, the area's hard limestone foundation would make it difficult to construct adequate drift fences. Additionally, a python moves infrequently because of its predatory habits and is thus less likely to crawl into a trap. Finally, the immense range of the Burmese python undermines the utility of extensive trapping. Trapping could be practical on a smaller scale if critical areas were targeted.

Biocontrol, or biological control, of pythons has also been proposed by several scientists, to reduce population size of the big snakes despite their low detectability. Given that biocontrol methods present a nontrivial and somewhat unpredictable risk to the area's delicate ecosystem, additional research and careful deliberation are necessary before such techniques are used. Traditionally, biocontrols use a virus, parasite, or bacterium that is selective for the target species to reduce the population size. If the pathogen is not species-specific, it could harm other species. Another potential biocontrol method is the reintroduction of native predators like jaguars that had lived in Florida during the Pleistocene, but became locally extinct. These big cats can kill and eat large snakes (their diet in South America includes anacondas).

=== Legislation ===
While an effective and practical control method for South Florida's Burmese python population has yet to be proposed, regulatory measures are in place to prevent its further spread. Recently, Florida legislators have also enacted provisions targeting the release of exotic snakes into the wild. Specifically, in 2008, the Florida Fish and Wildlife Commission instituted regulations requiring permits for boas and pythons greater than 2 inches (51 mm) in diameter, as well as PIT tags implanted in the snake's skin for identification purposes. This measure aims to prevent the introduction of snake species such as the Burmese python to other regions beyond South Florida. Further, the United States Department of the Interior placed four additional snake species, including the Burmese python, under the Lacey Act provisions. According to these provisions, importation of Burmese pythons to the United States is illegal as of January 2012.

== See also ==
- Florida Python Challenge
- The Python Hunt
- Invasion of the Giant Pythons: Florida with Nigel Marven
- Invasive species in the United States
- List of invasive marine fish in Florida
- List of invasive plant species in Florida
- List of invasive species in Florida
- List of invasive species in the Everglades
- Lionfish
