= Tadoba Andhari Tiger Reserve =

National park and wildlife sanctuary in Maharashtra, India

- IUCN category II (national park)
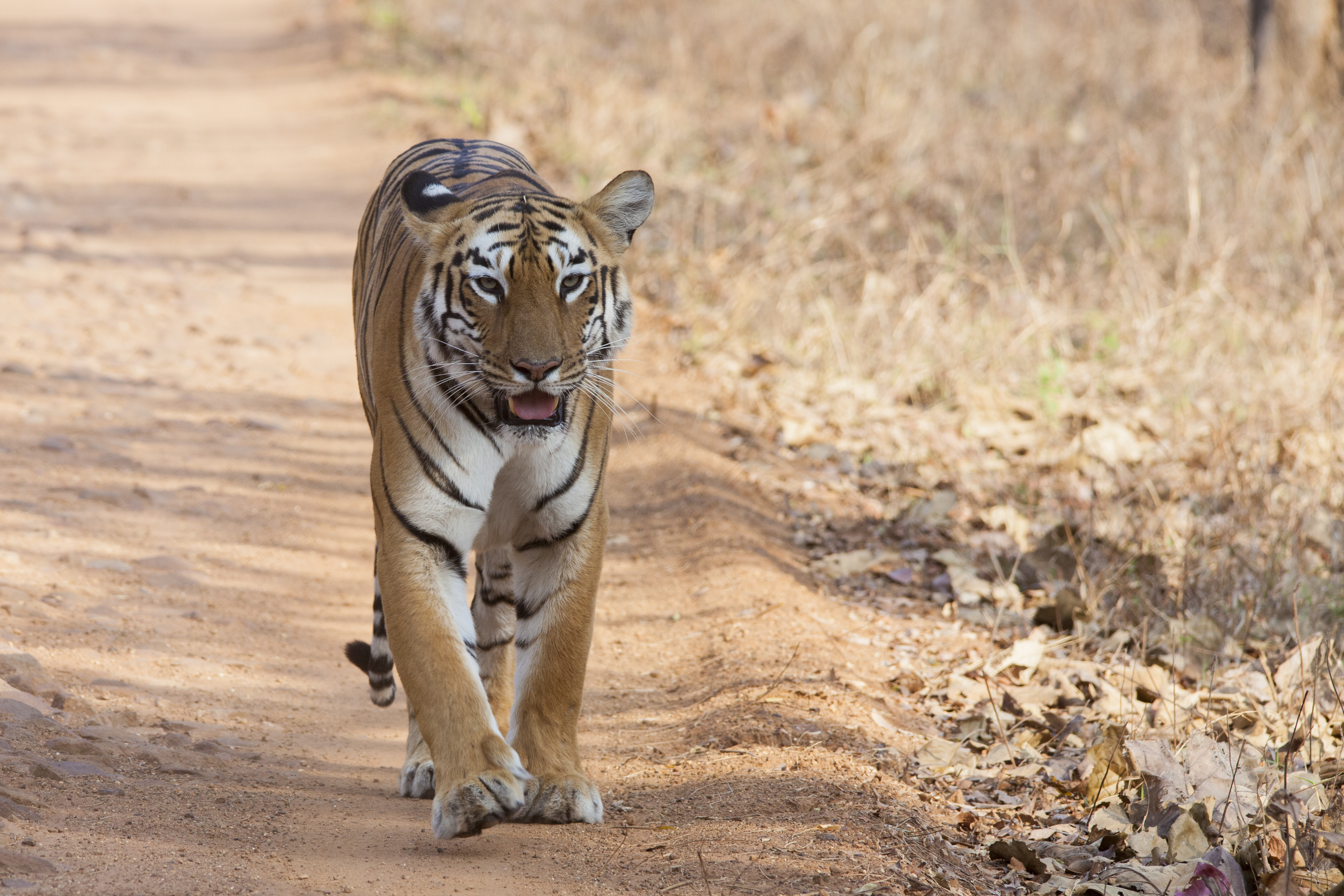
- Maya of Tadoba walks on the road

- Location within Maharashtra Location within India
- Interactive map of Tadoba Andhari Tiger Reserve
- Location: Chandrapur district, Maharashtra, India
- Nearest city: Chandrapur
- Coordinates: 20°16′0″N 79°24′0″E
- Area: 1,727.59 km^{2} (667.03 sq mi)
- Established: 1955
- Governing body: Maharashtra Forest Department

The Tadoba Andhari Tiger Reserve is a protected area in Chandrapur district of Maharashtra state in India that consists of Tadoba National Park and Andhari Wildlife Sanctuary. The reserve includes 577.96 km^{2} (223.15 sq mi) of reserved forest and 32.51 km^{2} (12.55 sq mi) of protected forest.

== Etymology ==
"Tadoba" is taken from the name of the god "Tadoba" or "Taru", worshipped by the tribal people who live in the dense forests of the Tadoba and Andhari region; "Andhari" refers to the Andhari river that meanders through the forest.

== History ==
Legend holds that Taru was a village chief who was killed in a mythological encounter with a tiger. Taru was deified, and a shrine dedicated to Taru now exists beneath a large tree on the banks of Tadoba Lake.

The Gondi people once ruled these forests in the vicinity of the Chimur hills. Hunting was banned in 1935. Two decades later, in 1955, 116.54 km^{2} (45.00 sq mi) of this forest area was declared a national park. Andhari Wildlife Sanctuary was created in the adjacent forests in 1986. In 1995, the park and the sanctuary were merged to establish the present tiger reserve.

== Geography ==
Tadoba Andhari Reserve is the largest national park in Maharashtra. The reserve covers a total area of 1,727.59 km^{2} (667.03 sq mi), comprising a core or critical tiger habitat of 625.82 km^{2} (241.63 sq mi) and a surrounding buffer zone of 1,101.77 km^{2} (425.40 sq mi). The core includes Tadoba National Park, with an area of 116.55 km^{2} (45.00 sq mi) and Andhari Wildlife Sanctuary, with an area of 508.85 km^{2} (196.47 sq mi). The reserve also includes 32.51 km^{2} (12.55 sq mi), of protected forest and 14.93 km^{2} (5.76 sq mi) of uncategorised land.

To the southwest is the 120 ha (300 acres) Tadoba Lake, which acts as a buffer between the park's forest and the extensive farmland, which extends up to Irai water reservoir. This lake is a perennial water source, which offers a good habitat for Muggar crocodiles to thrive. Other wetland areas within the reserve include Kolsa Lake and the Andhari river.

Tadoba Reserve covers the Chimur Hill, and the Andhari sanctuary covers the Moharli and Kolsa ranges. Nearest village from this place is Durgapur. It is bounded on the northern and western sides by densely forested hills. Thick forests are relieved by smooth meadows and deep valleys as the terrain slopes from north to south. Cliffs, talus, and caves provide refuge for several animals. The two forested rectangles are formed of the Tadoba and Andhari ranges. The south part of the park is less hilly than the remainder.

== Climate ==
Winter from November to February temperatures ranging from 10 to 25 °C (50 to 77 °F). Summer from March to June experiences temperatures up to 47 °C (117 °F). In monsoon from July to September the region receives approximately 1,275 mm (50.2 in) of rainfall annually, with humidity levels hovering around 66%.

== Flora ==
A bamboo-lined forest trail

Tadoba Andhari Tiger Reserve is part of the Central Deccan Plateau dry deciduous forests, with dense woodlands comprising about 87% of the protected area. Teak is the predominant tree species. Other deciduous trees found in this area include crocodile bark, bija, dhauda, hald, salai, semal, and tendu. Beheda, hirda, karaya gum, crepe myrtle, Flame of the forest, and Lannea coromandelica (wodier tree). Axlewood (a fire-resistant species), black plum and arjun are some of the other tropical trees that grow in this reserve.

Patches of grasses are found throughout the reserve. Bamboo thickets grow throughout the reserve in abundance. The climber kach kujali (velvet bean) found here is a medicinal plant used to treat Parkinson's disease. The leaves of bheria are used as an insect repellent and bija is a medicinal gum. Beheda is also an important medicine found here.

== Fauna ==
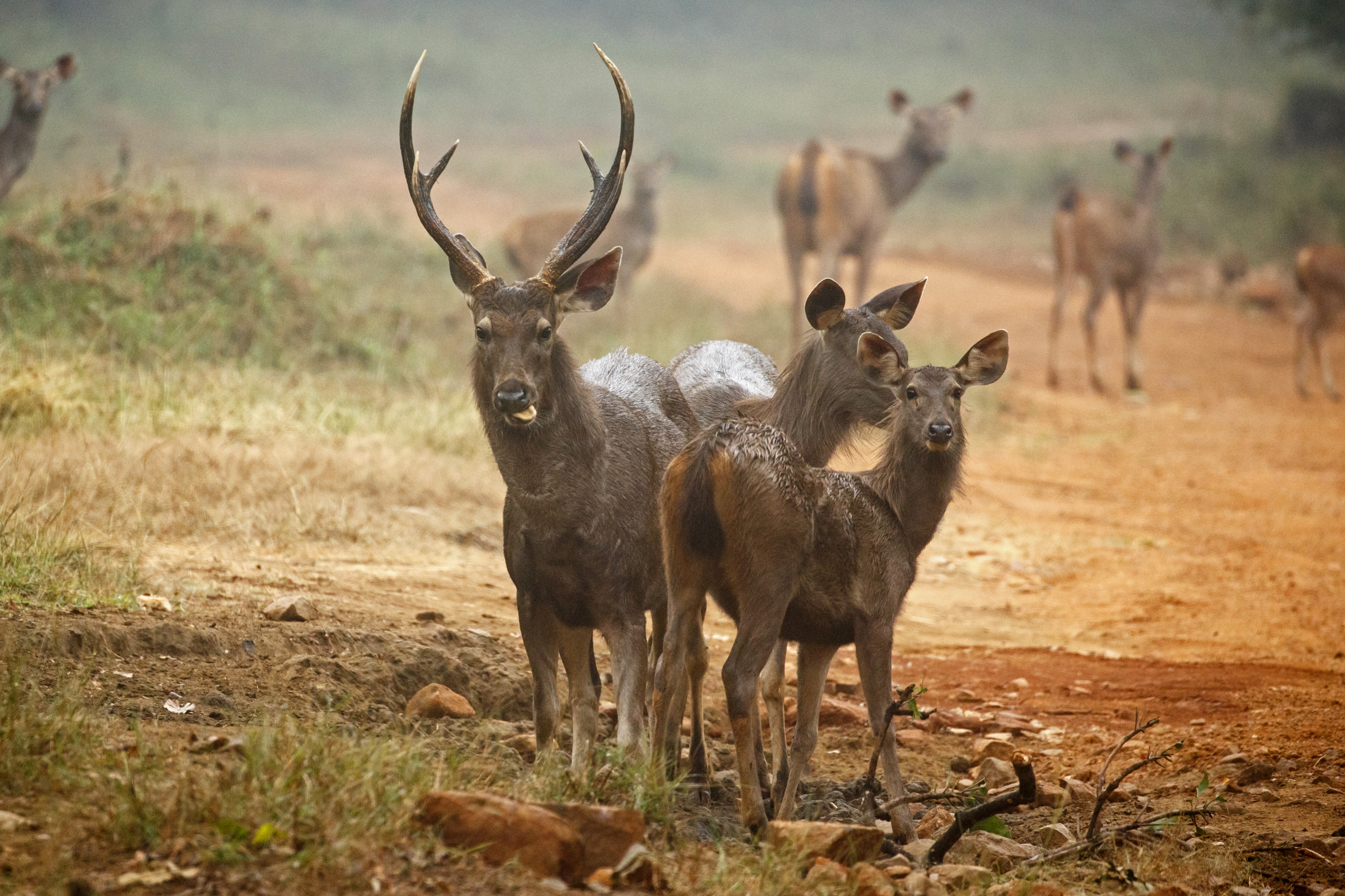
Sambar-Tadoba TR

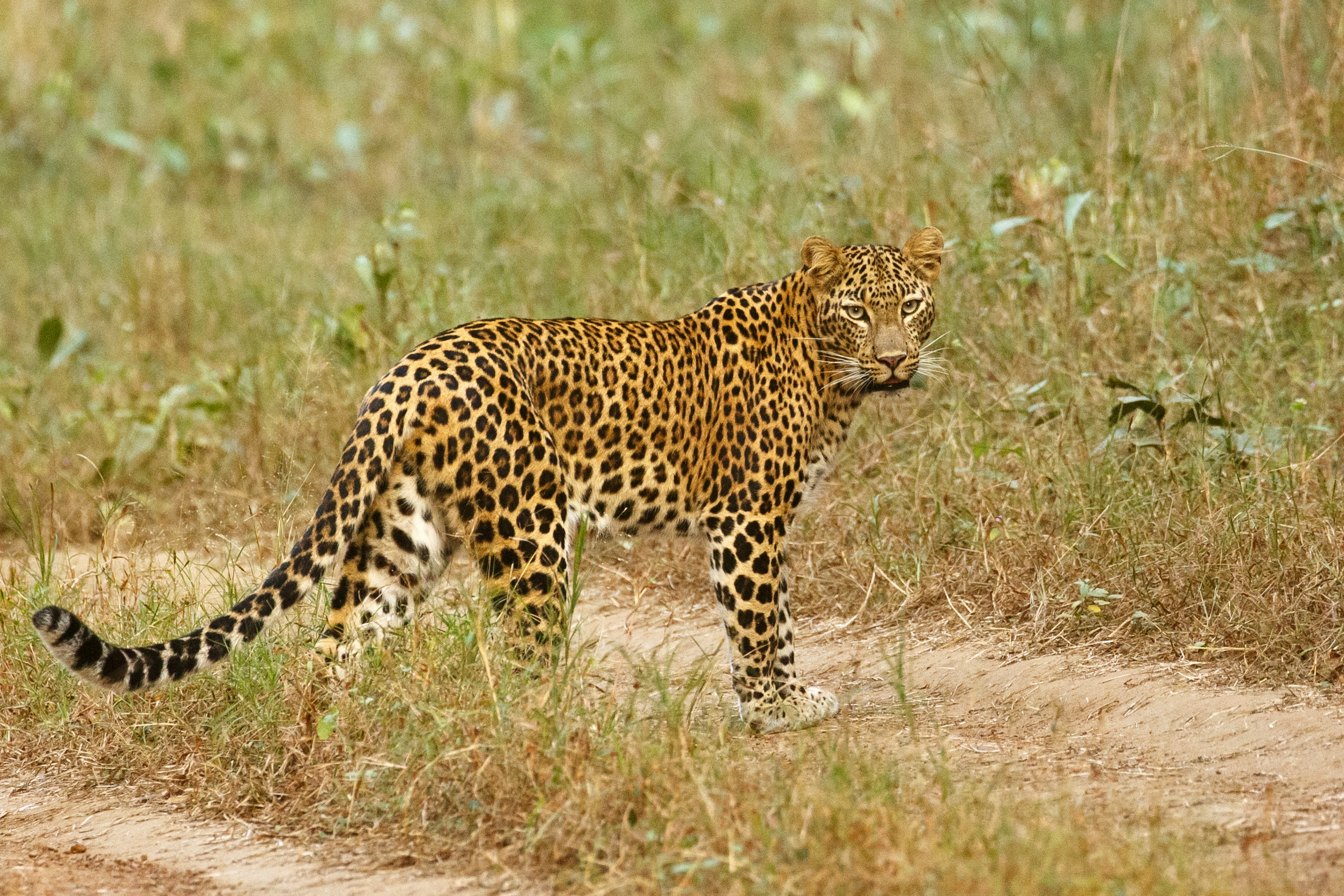
Leopard in Tadoba TR

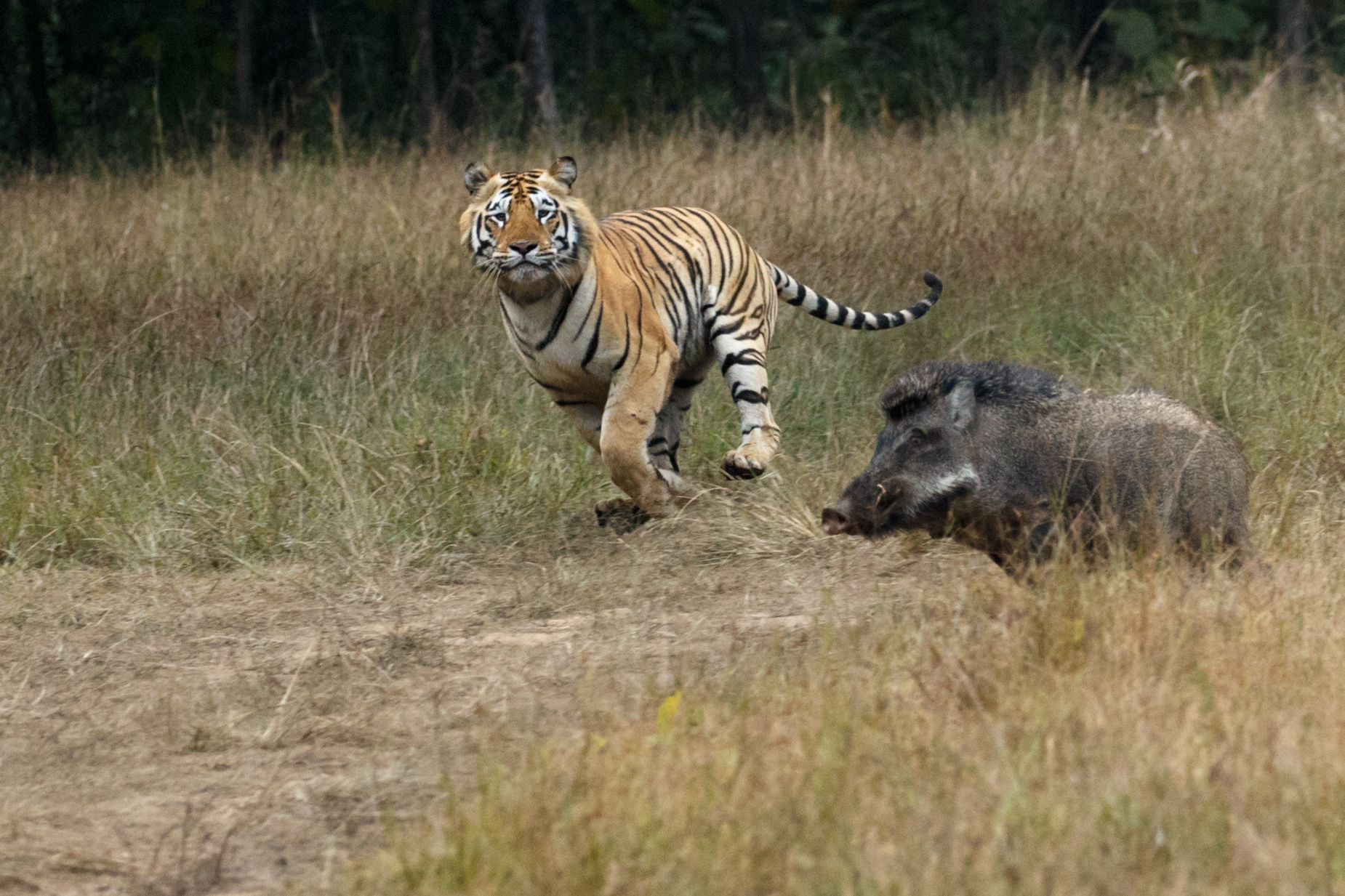
Tiger chasing a wild pig

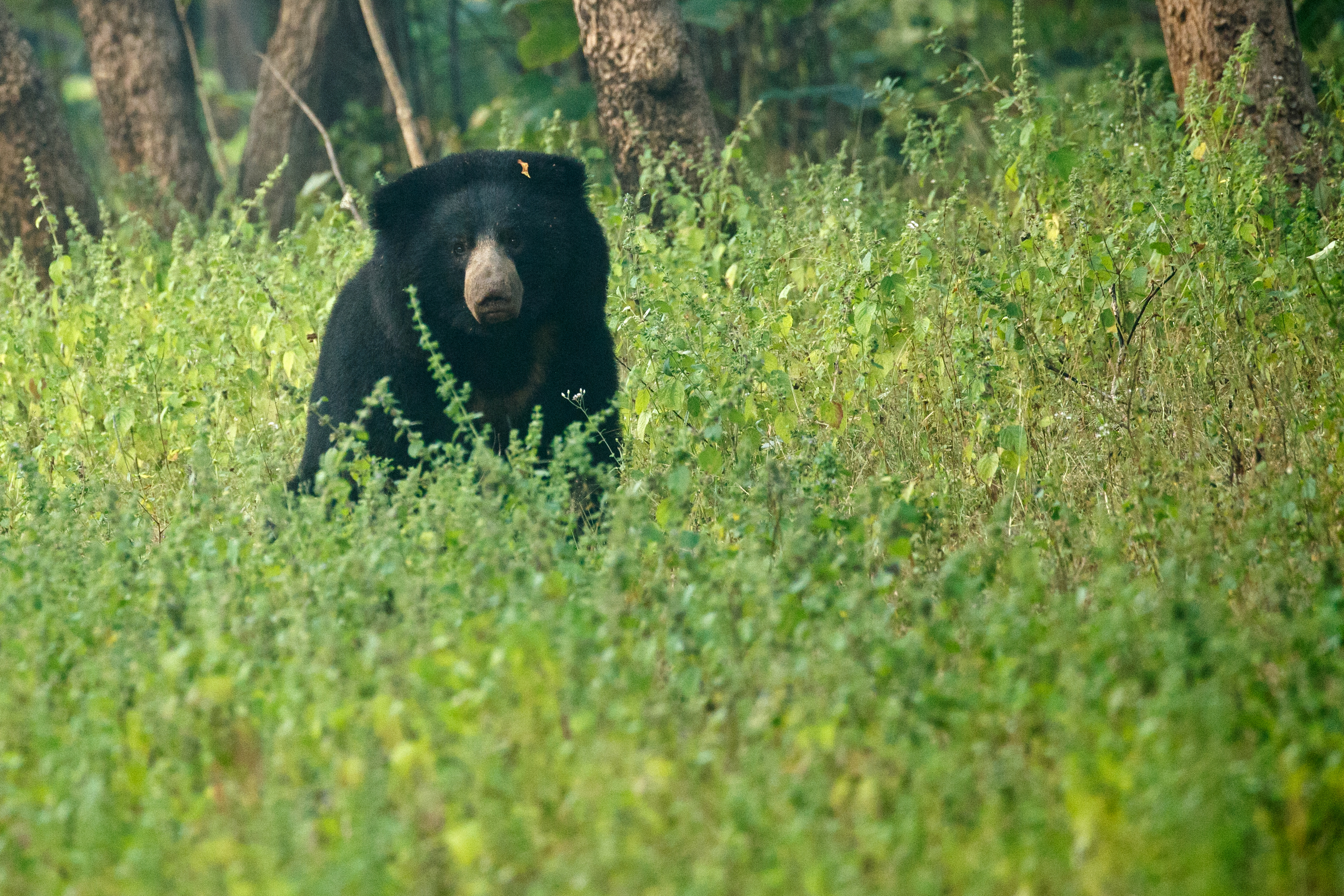
Sloth bear in Tadoba TR

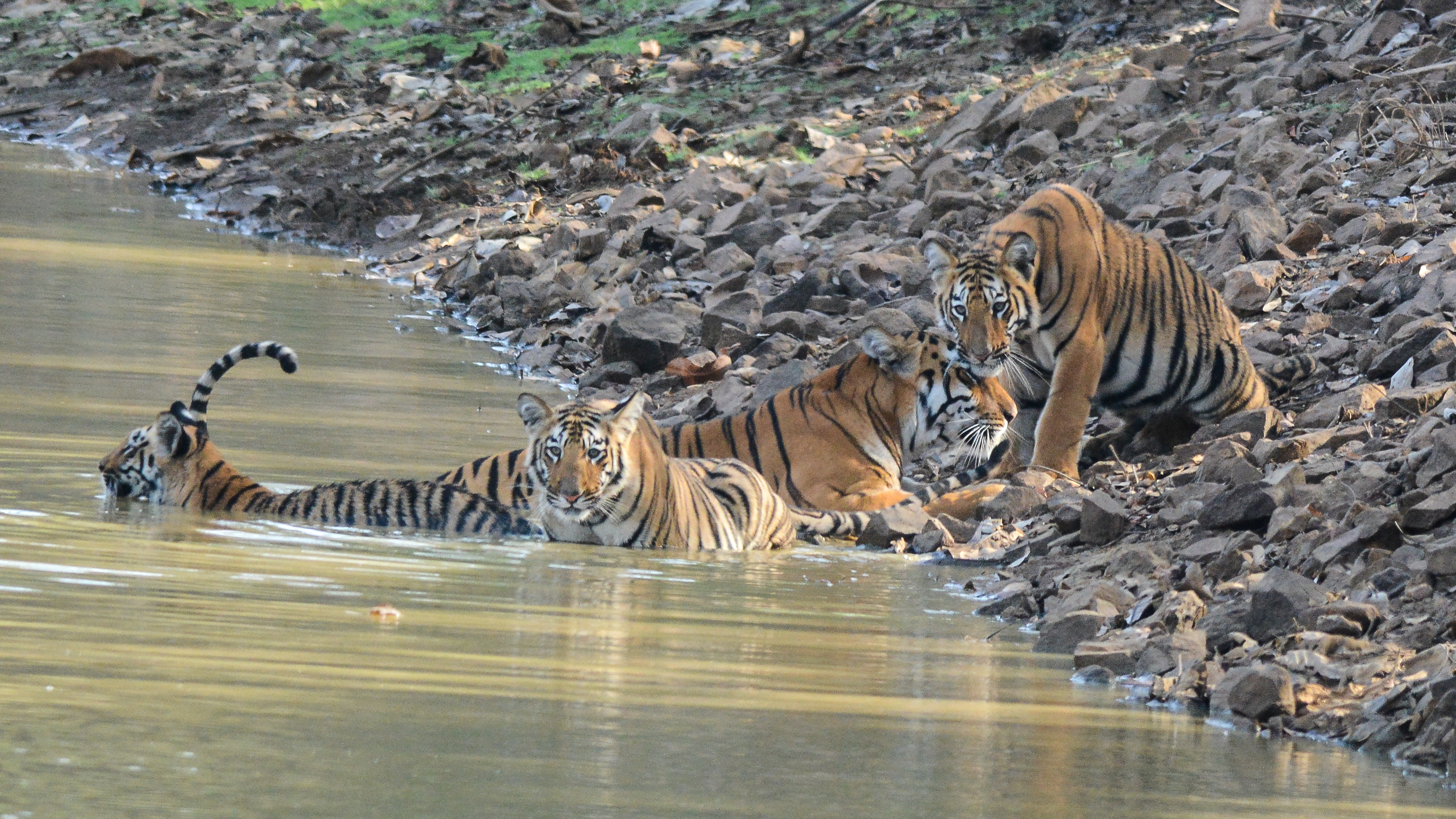
Tigress Maya with her cubs

Aside from the Bengal tiger, Tadoba Tiger Reserve is home to other mammals, including the Indian leopard, sloth bears, gaur, nilgai, dhole, small Indian civet, jungle cats, sambar, barking deer, chital, chausingha and honey badger. Tadoba lake sustains the Mugger crocodile, which was once common all over Maharashtra. Reptiles here include endangered Indian python and common Indian monitor. Terrapins, Indian star tortoise, Indian cobra and Russel's viper also live in Tadoba. The lake contains a wide variety of water birds, and raptors. 195 species of birds have been recorded, including 3 endangered species. The grey-headed fish eagle, crested serpent eagle, and changeable hawk-eagle are some of the raptors seen in the park. Other bird species found in the reserve include the orange-headed thrush, Indian pitta, crested treeswift, Stone-curlew, crested honey buzzard, paradise flycatcher, bronze-winged jacana, Black-rumped flameback, various warblers, Black-naped monarch and the Indian peafowl.74 species of butterflies have been recorded including pansies, monarchs, mormons and swordtails.

Insect species include the endangered danaid egg-fly and great eggfly. Dragonflies, stick insects, jewel beetles and the praying mantis are other insects in the reserve. The signature spider, giant wood spider and red wood spiders are often seen during the monsoon and soon after. Some hunting spiders like the wolf spiders, crab spiders and lynx spiders are also common. A black panther was spotted in May 2018. As per the officials, it is a rare sight since black panthers normally live in evergreen forests and not in dry deciduous forests like Tadoba Tiger Reserve.

== Threats ==
There are 41,644 people living in and around the reserve in fifty nine villages of which five are inside the core zone. These villages in the core zone still farm inside the core area. First village to be relocated was Boteyzari (2007), followed by Kolsa (2007 and 2022), Navegaon (Ramdegi) (2013), Jamni (2014), Palsagaon Singru (2019). Currently, Rantalodhi is under the process of rehabilitation. The process of rehabilitation is going on. Recently the Navegaon village was rehabilitated, and grassland is expected on the place where the village existed. There are 41,820 cattle within the core and buffer zone. While cattle grazing is not allowed in the core zone, regulated grazing in the buffer zone is allowed to cattle of the village inhabitants. However, cattle in peripheral villages sometimes find their way into the reserve and cause additional damage to the habitat.

Forest fires are a constant problem in the dry season, consistently burning between 2% and 16% of the park each year. The killing of domestic livestock by tigers and leopards is a frequent phenomenon in neighboring villages. This has an adverse impact on the economic condition of the local people and results in a negative view of the reserve management. In the year 2013, at least four people and 30-50 cattle were killed by leopards, tigers or sloth bears. Densely forested hills form the northern and western boundary of the tiger reserve. The elevation of the hills ranges from 200 metres (660 ft) to 350 metres (1,150 ft).

== See also ==
- Kanhargaon Wildlife Sanctuary
