= Andhari, Vikramgad =

Village in Maharashtra

Andhari
- village
- Location in Maharashtra, India Andhari (India)
- Coordinates: 19.7775529°N 73.1887993°E
- Country: India
- State: Maharashtra
- District: Palghar
- Taluka: Vikramgad
- Elevation: 83 m (272 ft)

Population (2011)
  - Total: 617
- Time zone: UTC+5:30 (IST)
- 2011 census code: 551798

Andhari is a village in the Palghar district of Maharashtra, India. It is located in the Vikramgad taluka.

== Demographics ==
According to the 2011 census of India, Andhari has 121 households. The effective literacy rate (i.e. the literacy rate of population excluding children aged 6 and below) is 75.43%.

Demographics (2011 Census)
	Total	Male	Female
Population	617	318	299
Children aged below 6 years	92	48	44
Scheduled caste	0	0	0
Scheduled tribe	616	318	298
Literates	396	214	182
Workers (all)	359	170	189
Main workers (total)	142	136	6
Main workers: Cultivators	131	130	1
Main workers: Agricultural labourers	8	4	4
Main workers: Household industry workers	0	0	0
Main workers: Other	3	2	1
Marginal workers (total)	217	34	183
Marginal workers: Cultivators	114	15	99
Marginal workers: Agricultural labourers	103	19	84
Marginal workers: Household industry workers	0	0	0
Marginal workers: Others	0	0	0
Non-workers	258	148	110
