= Andhari, West Singhbhum =

Village in Jharkhand, India

Andhari
- Village
- Interactive map of Andhari
- Location within Jharkhand Location within India
- Coordinates: 22.1494407°N 85.9069333°E
- Country: India
- State: Jharkhand
- District: West Singhbhum
- Block: Kumardungi

Area
  - Total: 4.81 km^{2} (1.86 sq mi)
- Elevation: 449 m (1,473 ft)

Population (2011)
  - Total: 1,820
  - Density: 378/km^{2} (980/sq mi)
- PIN: 833214
- Vehicle registration: JH-06
- Website: www.chaibasa.nic.in

Andhari is a village in Kumardungi block, West Singhbhum, Jharkhand, India. As per 2011 census, Andhari has a population of 1,820 with 902 males and 918 females. Kumardungi Degree college is located here.

Historical population
Year	Pop.	±%
2001	1,506	—
2011	1,820	+20.8%

== Geography ==
Andhari is located at 22.1494407°N 85.9069333°E. In Kumardungi block, West Singhbhum district, Jharkhand, India, Asia. It is surrounded by villages. Chota Raikhaman, Raikhomon, Baralunti and Bankdar at south, Balidaskan at east, Gandkida, Dhori, Putkarsai, Jauraposi and Bara Mundui at north and Kadamdiha, Itar and Mahuldiha at west.

== Demographics ==
SC population
Year	Pop.	±%
2001	10	—
2011	69	+590.0%

ST population
Year	Pop.	±%
2001	1,058	—
2011	1,236	+16.8%

Castes in Andhari village (2011):
1. Scheduled castes 69 (3.79%)
2. Scheduled tribes 1,236 (67.9%)
3. Not indigenous 515 (28.3%)

As of 2011 census, Andhari has a population of 1,820 with 902 being males and 918 being females, making the sex ratio of 1018 females per 1000 males. Children population (0–6) is 339, which is 18.63% of the population.

=== Literacy ===
Literacy rate is 49.76% with male literacy of 62.52% and female literacy of 37.33%, which is both lower than state average of 66.41% and national average of 80.88%.

== Education ==
Andhari has a literacy rate of 49.76% which possibly indicates more than half of people are unliterate, showing demographics challenges. Andhari has 737 total literate of which 457 are males and 280 are females.

Iliterate population
Total	Male	Female
1,083	445	638🚨

Kumardungi degree college is located here. It looks modern. Avlavya Balika Vidyalaya is adjacent which is in Gankida while Kumardungi degree college is in Andhari.
