= Andhari River =

Location
- Country: India
- State: Maharashtra
- Region: Vidarbha
- District: Chandrapur

Physical characteristics
- Source
  - location: Chandrapur
- Mouth: Wainganga river
  - location: Near Ghatkul village, Chandrapur
  - coordinates: 19°44′29″N 79°45′59″E

Andhari river is a minor river of the Wainganga basin. It flows through the Chandrapur district of Maharashtra. Meandering through the Tadoba forests, it gives its name to Tadoba Andhari Tiger Reserve.
