= Andhari, Siddhicharan =

Former Village Development Committee in Nepal

Andhari अँधेरी is a market in Siddhicharan Municipality in Okhaldhunga District in the Sagarmatha Zone of mid-eastern Nepal. This village center was merged to the Municipality in May 2014. At the time of the 1991 Nepal census it had a population of 2536 living in 490 individual households.
