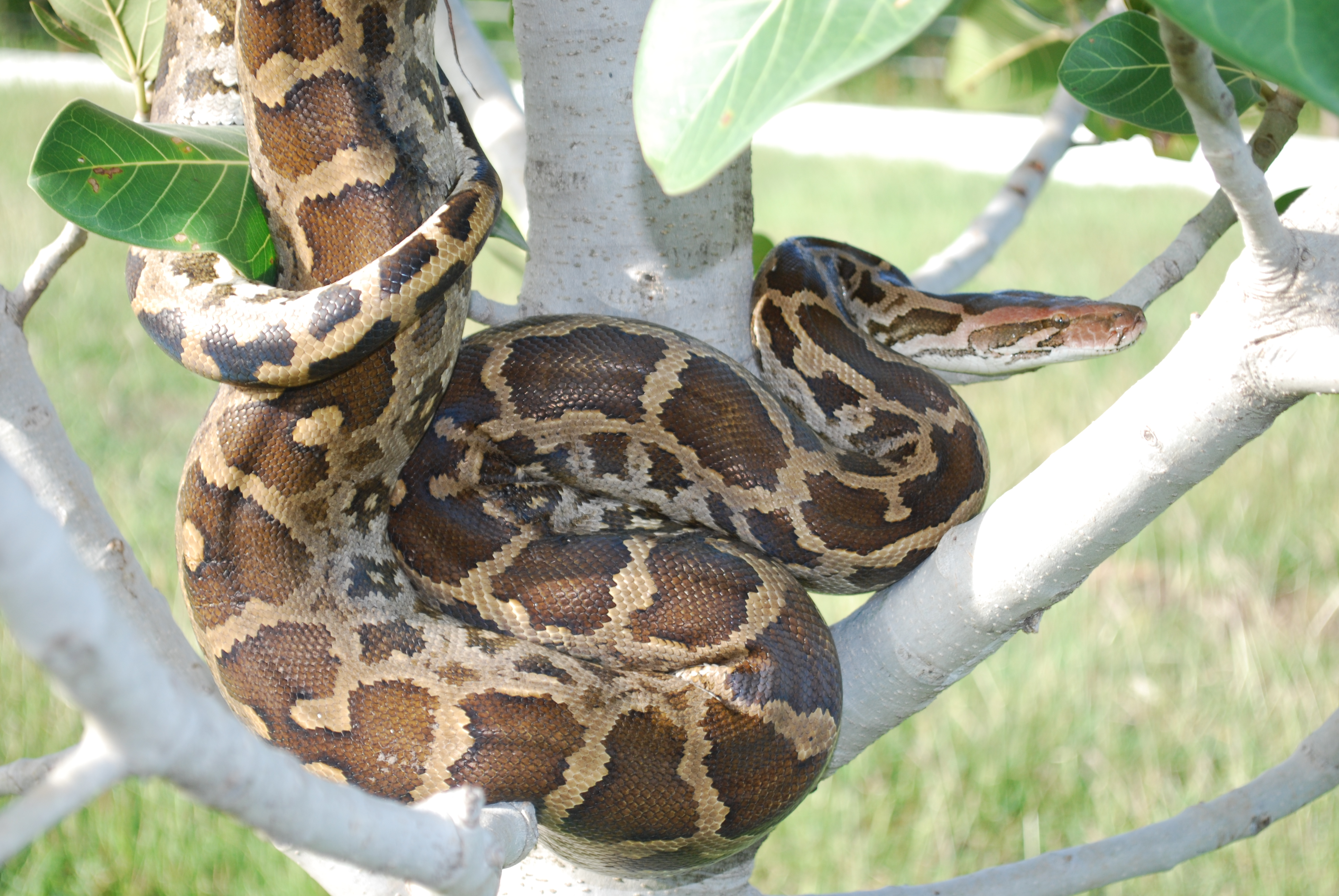
- Near Nagarhole National Park

Conservation status
- Near Threatened (IUCN 3.1)

Scientific classification
- Kingdom: Animalia
- Phylum: Chordata
- Class: Reptilia
- Order: Squamata
- Suborder: Serpentes
- Family: Pythonidae
- Genus: Python
- Species: P. molurus

Binomial name
- Python molurus (Linnaeus, 1758)
- Distribution of Indian python

Synonyms
- Boa molura Linnaeus, 1758; Boa ordinata Schneider, 1801; Boa cinerae Schneider, 1801; Boa castanea Schneider, 1801; Boa albicans Schneider, 1801; Boa orbiculata Schneider, 1801; Coluber boaeformis Shaw, 1802; Python bora Daudin, 1803; Python tigris Daudin, 1803; Python ordinatus Daudin, 1803; Python javanicus Kuhl, 1820; Python jamesonii Gray, 1842; Python (Asterophis) tigris Fitzinger, 1843

= Indian python =

Species of snake

The Indian python (Python molurus) is a large python species native to tropical and subtropical regions of the Indian subcontinent and Southeast Asia. It is also known by the common names black-tailed python, Indian rock python, and Asian rock python. Although smaller than its close relative the Burmese python, it is still among the largest snakes in the world. It is generally lighter colored than the Burmese python and reaches usually 3 m (9 ft 10 in). Like all pythons, it is nonvenomous.

== Description ==
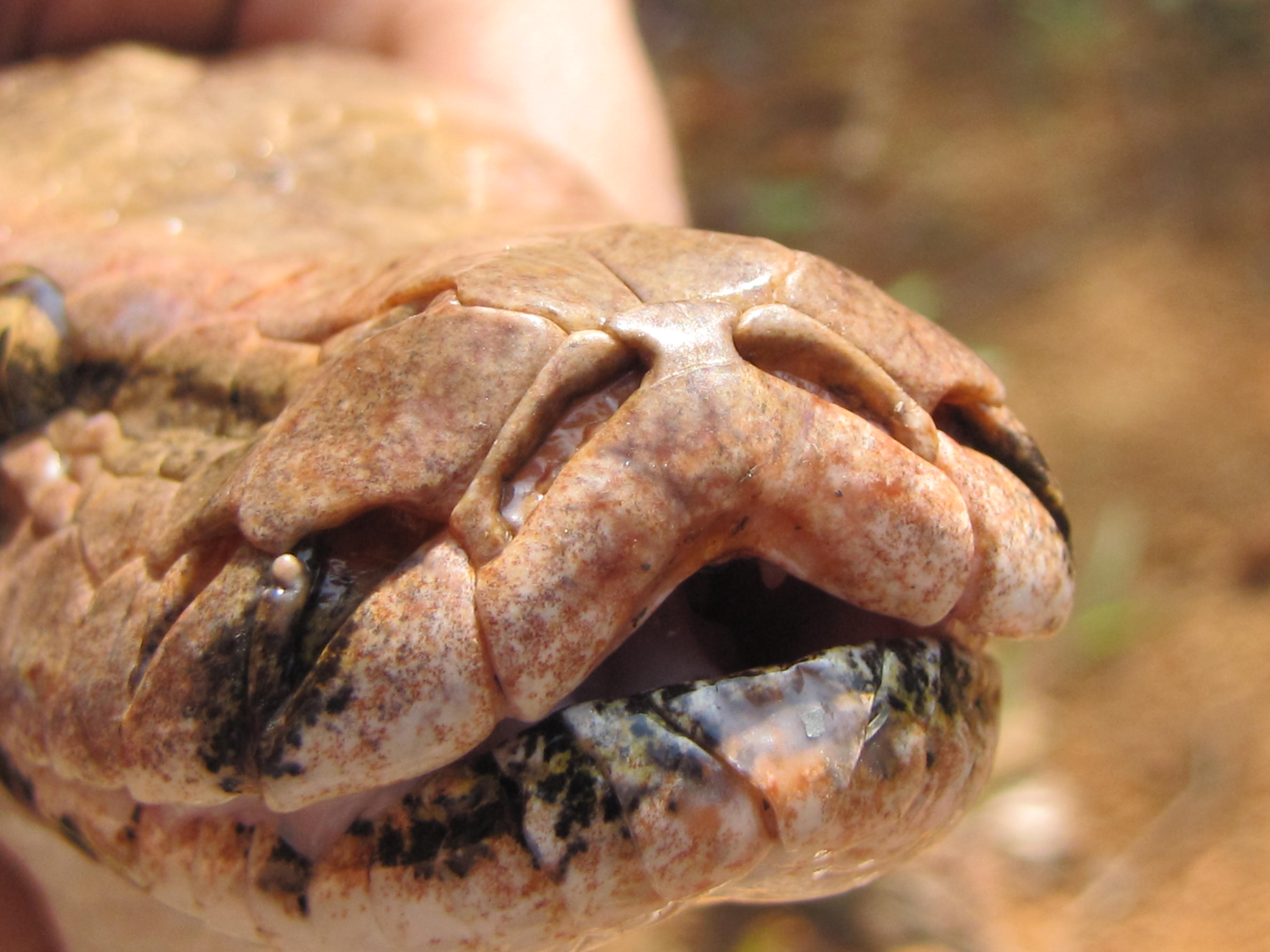
Labial heat pits

The rock python's color pattern is whitish or yellowish with the blotched patterns varying from tan to dark brown shades. This varies with terrain and habitat. Specimens from the hill forests of Western Ghats and Assam are darker, while those from the Deccan Plateau and Eastern Ghats are usually lighter. All pythons are non-venomous.

The nominate subspecies occurring in India typically grows to 3 m (9 ft 10 in). This value is supported by a 1990 study in Keoladeo National Park, where 25% of the python population was 2.7–3.3 m (8 ft 10 in – 10 ft 10 in) long. Two individuals even measured nearly 3.6 m (11 ft 10 in).

Because of confusion with the Burmese python, exaggerations, and stretched skins in the past, the maximum length of this subspecies is difficult to tell. The longest scientifically recorded specimen, collected in Pakistan, was 4.6 m (15 ft 1 in) long and weighed 52 kg (114 lb 10 oz). In Pakistan, Indian pythons commonly reach a length of 2.4–3.0 m (7 ft 10 in – 9 ft 10 in).

The Indian python differs from the Burmese python (Python bivittatus) in the following ways:

- the presence of light "eyes" in the centers of spots located on the sides of the trunk
- reddish or pinkish color of light stripes on the sides of the head
- a diamond-shaped spot on the head blurred in the front part
- usually lighter in color, dominated by brown, reddish-brown, yellowish-brown and grayish-brown tones
- usually prefers a drier, more arid environment, unlike P. bivittatus, which inhabits moist, meadow environments

== Distribution and habitat ==
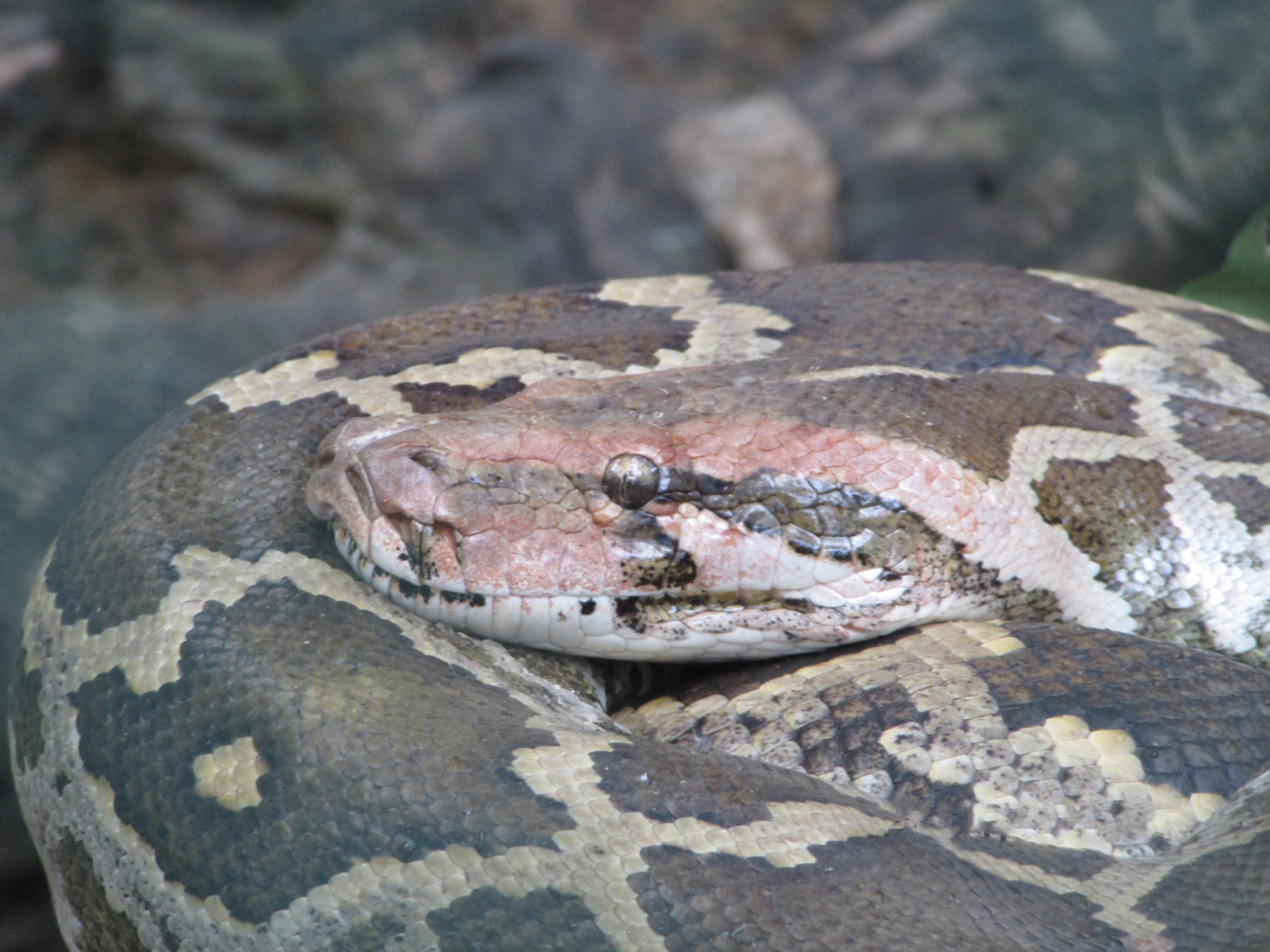
Bannerghatta National Park

The Indian python occurs in nearly all of the Indian subcontinent south of the Himalayas, including southern Nepal and Bhutan, Sri Lanka, southeastern Pakistan, Bangladesh, and probably in northern Myanmar. It lives in a wide range of habitats, including grasslands, swamps, marshes, rocky foothills, woodlands, open forest, and river valleys. It needs a reliable source of water. It hides in abandoned mammal burrows, hollow trees, dense water reeds, and mangrove thickets.

== Behavior ==
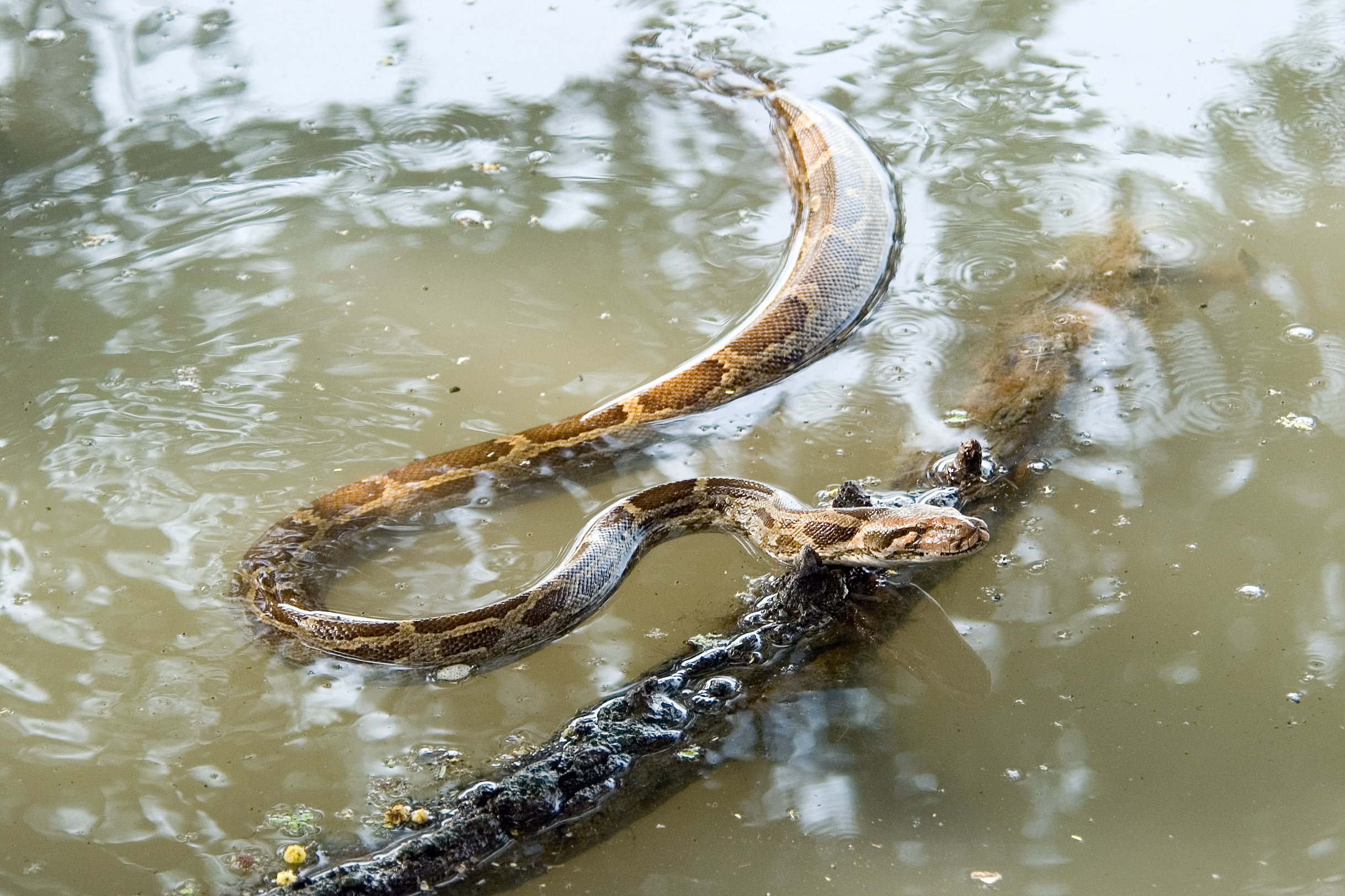
Swimming at Keoladeo National Park

Lethargic and slow moving even in their native habitat, they exhibit timidity and rarely try to attack even when attacked. Locomotion is usually with the body moving in a straight line, by "walking on its ribs". They are excellent swimmers and are quite at home in water. They can be wholly submerged in water for many minutes if necessary, but usually prefer to remain near the bank.

=== Feeding ===
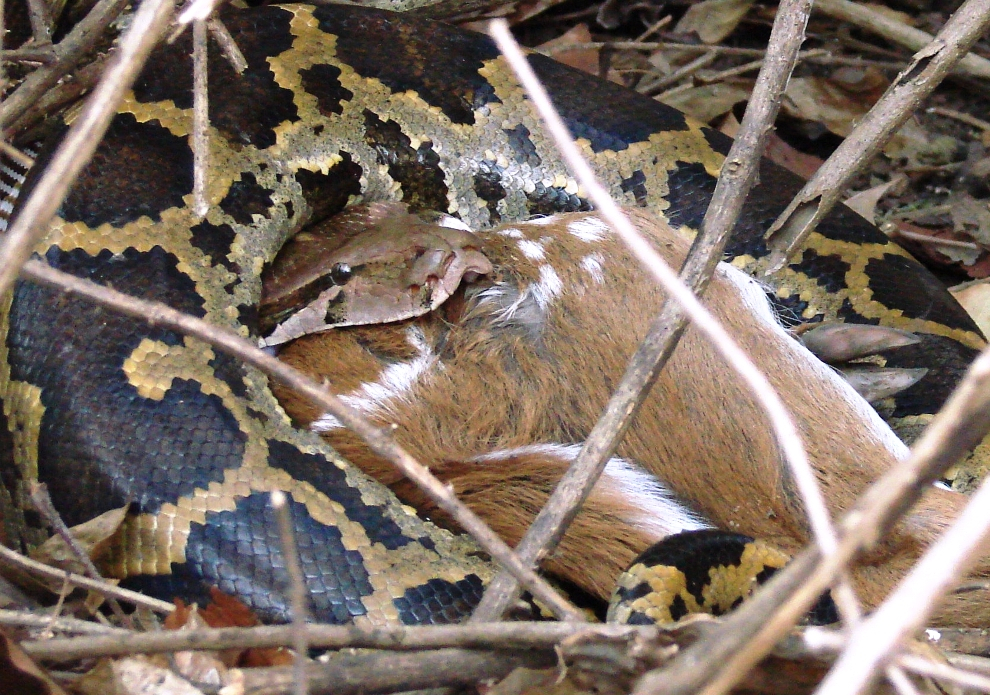
Swallowing a chital in Mudumalai National Park

Like all snakes, Indian pythons are strict carnivores and feed on mammals, birds, reptiles, and amphibians indiscriminately, but seem to prefer mammals. Roused to activity on sighting prey, the snake advances with a quivering tail and lunges with an open mouth. Live prey is constricted and killed. One or two coils are used to hold it in a tight grip. The prey, unable to breathe, succumbs and is subsequently swallowed head first. After a heavy meal, they are disinclined to move. If forced to, hard parts of the meal may tear through the body. Therefore, if disturbed, some specimens disgorge their meal to escape from potential predators. After a heavy meal, an individual may fast for weeks, the longest recorded duration being 2 years. The python can swallow prey bigger than its diameter because its jaw bones are not connected. Moreover, prey cannot escape from its mouth because of the arrangement of the teeth (which are reverse saw-like).

In Keoladeo National Park, potential prey of Indian pythons include rhesus macaques, spotted deer, sambar deer, nilgai, Indian cattle (Bos indicus), wild boar, golden jackals, domestic dogs, striped hyenas, jungle cats, small Indian civets, mongooses, black-napped hares (Lepus nigricollis), Indian porcupines, five-striped palm squirrels, field rats, birds, other snakes, Bengal monitors, garden lizards (Calotes versicolor), skinks (Eutropis spp.), geckos (Hemidactylus spp.), and Indian toads.

=== Reproduction ===
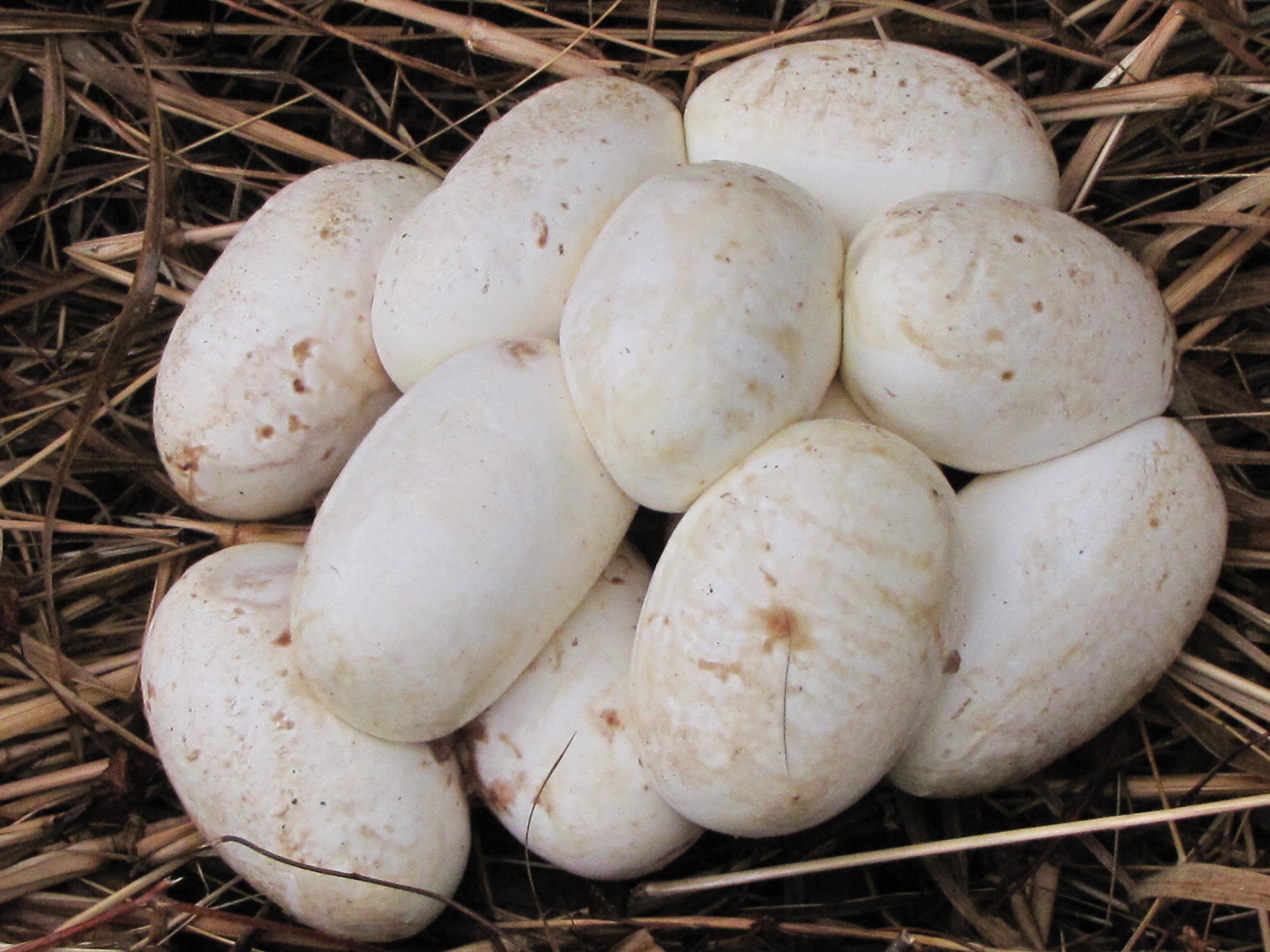
Eggs

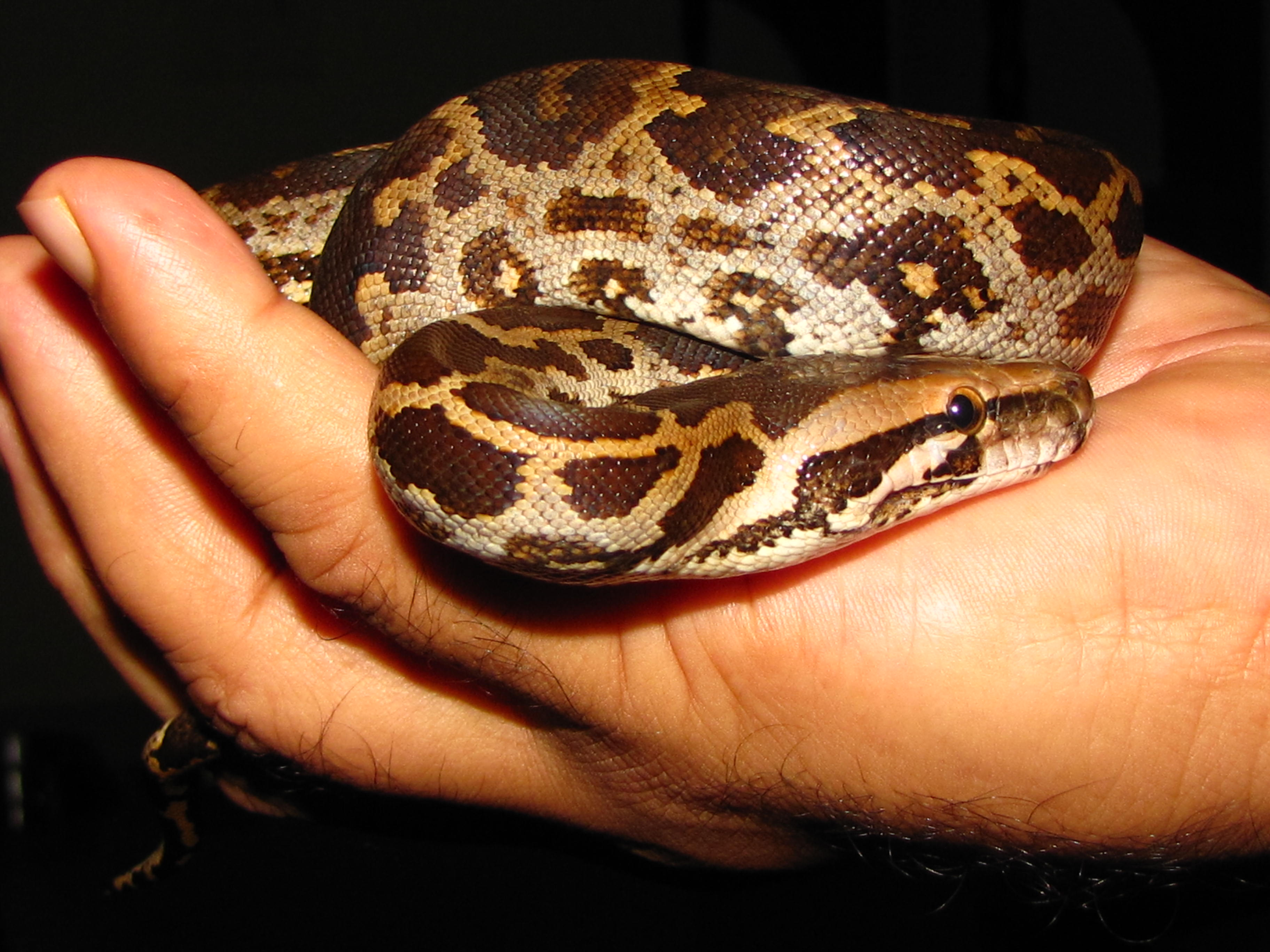
A juvenile

Oviparous, up to 100 eggs are laid by a female, which she protects and incubates. Towards this end, they are capable of raising their body temperature above the ambient level through muscular contractions. The hatchlings are 45–60 cm (18–24 in) in length and grow quickly. An artificial incubation method using climate-controlled environmental chambers was developed in India for successfully raising hatchlings from abandoned or unattended eggs.

== Conservation status ==
The Indian python is classified as Near Threatened on the IUCN Red List due to a likely population decline of ~30% over the decade 2010–2020, caused by habitat loss, over-exploitation, and lack of conservation actions.

A genetic study published in 2017 showed that the Burmese pythons in Florida are hybrids with P. molurus.

== Taxonomy ==
In the literature, one other subspecies is encountered: P. m. pimbura Deraniyagala, 1945, which is found in Sri Lanka.

The Burmese python (P. bivittatus) was referred to as a subspecies of the Indian python until 2009, when it was elevated to full species status. The name Python molurus bivittatus is found in older literature.

== In culture ==
Kaa, a large and old Indian python, is featured as one of Mowgli's mentors in Rudyard Kipling's 1894 collection The Jungle Book.

== See also ==
- List of largest snakes
