= Florida Python Challenge =

American hunting competition

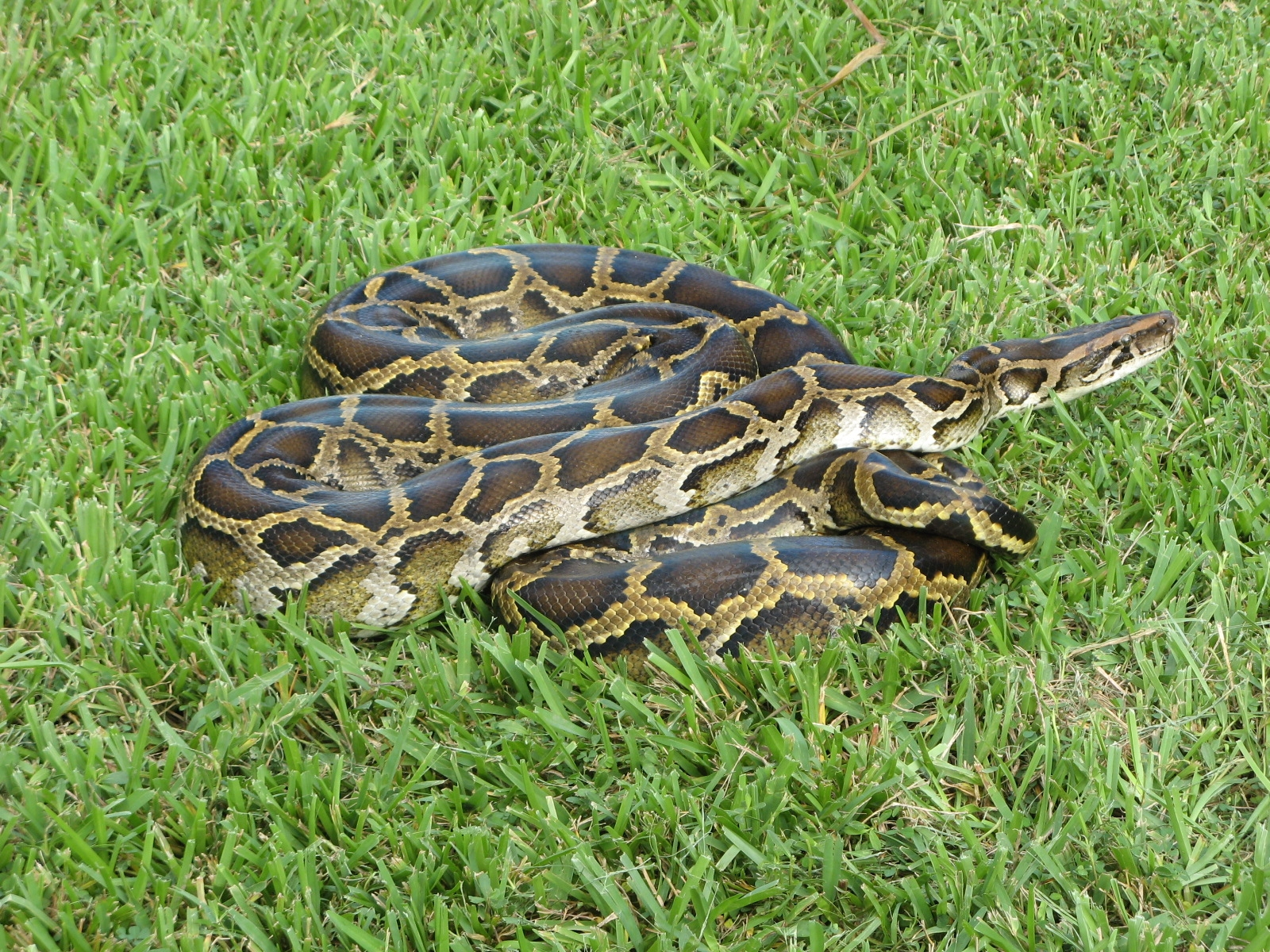
A Burmese python in the Florida Everglades

The Florida Python Challenge is an annual, ten-day competition where professional and novice participants join in the effort to remove invasive Burmese pythons in Florida. Past the goal of removing pythons, the competition also serves as a conservation effort to raise awareness about invasive species’ impacts to the local ecology and to encourage the public to continuously remove Burmese pythons from the wild. It is supported by the Florida Fish and Wildlife Conservation Commission (FWC), the Fish and Wildlife Foundation of Florida, the South Florida Water Management District (SFWMD), and Governor Ron DeSantis.

Most recently, in 2024, the Florida Python Challenge resulted in the total removal of 195 pythons, and the winner removed 20 pythons.

== Rules ==
The competition rules generally align with the area regulations of the seven competition locations (Big Cypress Wildlife Management Area, Everglades and St. Francis Taylor WMA, Frog Pond Public Small Game Hunting Area, Holey Land WMA, Rocky Glades Public Small Game Hunting Area, Rotenberger WMA, and Southern Glades WMA), but there are additional rules specific to the competition, covering registration, removal methods, and animal handling.

Participants may register as a professional or a novice. Professionals are those that are paid python removal contractors for the FWC or SFWMD, while novices are all other participants, i.e. members of the public. To register, there is a fee of $25, and participants must take a required online training. Participants must not have prior convictions for fish or wildlife violations or animal cruelty.

Certain methods, such as the use of firearms, traps, bait, explosives, and chemicals, are prohibited. Participants are disqualified if they kill a native Florida snake, submit a python that was a pet, are found to have inhumanely killed a python, etc. Additionally, participants are not allowed to harm “scout snakes,” which are Burmese pythons that are tracked for research purposes and marked with orange tags.

As Burmese pythons are protected by anti-cruelty law, participants are required to abide by the American Veterinary Medical Association’s recommendations for methods of humanely killing reptiles. The general, two-step method, regardless of what tools are used, is:

1. Immediate loss of consciousness: Force must be applied to the brain so that the target immediately loses consciousness.
2. Destroy the brain: Via pithing, a small rod must be inserted into the cranial cavity to substantially destroy the brain.

== History ==
The Florida Python Challenge first ran in 2013 as a month-long competition, then again in 2016. It was brought back in 2020 as a ten-day competition initially dubbed the “Python Bowl”—since then, the competition duration has remained as ten days, and it has been held annually.

In 2023, $10,000 was awarded to the Ultimate Grand Prize winner for most pythons removed (Paul Hobbs with 20 pythons), and $7,500 was awarded to the Ultimate Grand Prize Runner-Up (Ronald Kiger with 14 pythons). In addition, prizes of $2,500, $1,500, and $1,000 were respectively awarded to the Most Pythons, Most Pythons Runner-Up, and Longest Python winners for three categories: Military Prizes, Professional Prizes, and Novice Prizes.

History of the Florida Python Challenge
Year	Number of Participants	Competition Duration	Total Pythons Removed	Grand Prize (Most Pythons Removed)
2026	907	10 days	280	Tom Rahil, 96 pythons
2025	934	10 days	294	Taylor Stanberry, 60 pythons
2024	857	10 days	195	Ronald Kiger, 20 pythons
2023	1050	10 days	209	Paul Hobbs, 20 pythons
2022	Nearly 1000	10 days	231	Matthew Concepcion, 28 pythons
2021	Over 600	10 days	223	Charles Danton, 41 pythons
2020	Over 750	10 days	80	Mike Kimmel, 8 pythons
2019	Did not run			
2018	Did not run			
2017	Did not run			
2016	Over 1000	1 month	106	Bill Booth’s team, 33 pythons
2015	Did not run			
2014	Did not run			
2013	Nearly 1600	1 month	68	Brian Barrows, 6 pythons (General Competition) and Ruben Ramirez, 18 pythons (Python Permit Holders Competition)

== Impact ==
As it is difficult to detect pythons in the wild, scientists are unsure of the exact number of Burmese pythons in Florida, with estimates exceeding the tens of thousands. In 2023, a USGS study confirmed that the total eradication of Burmese pythons in Florida is likely impossible. Therefore, the results of the Florida Python Challenge are not very significant in the context of total estimates; still, the event has contributed to raising awareness, and even removing small numbers of invasive species helps protect native species.

Generally, the Florida Python Challenge is well-supported by local agencies, officials, and the media. However, there are few who claim that the challenge is unethical and ineffective.
