= List of mammals of Florida =

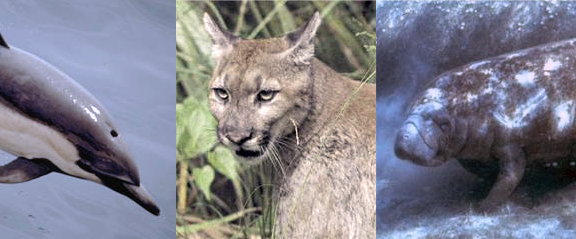
Dolphin, state saltwater mammal; Florida panther, state animal; and manatee, state marine mammal

One hundred sixteen species of mammals are known to inhabit, or have recently inhabited, the American state of Florida and its surrounding waters. This includes a few species, such as the black-tailed jackrabbit and red deer, that were introduced after the arrival of Europeans. It also includes the extinct Caribbean monk seal and Florida black wolf. Rodents account for roughly one quarter of all species, followed closely by mammals from the families Cetacea and Carnivora.

The species included in this list are drawn from the work of the American Society of Mammalogists (ASM), which compiled information from five different publications. Information on the international conservation status of species has been drawn from the IUCN Red List.

== Chiroptera ==
Of the bats listed below, thirteen are confirmed to be resident species - all of them are insectivorous. Eight species had very low numbers reported, and can be classified as accidental species: the Indiana bat, Jamaican fruit bat, buffy flower bat, Cuban flower bat, Cuban fig-eating bat, little brown bat, northern long-eared myotis, and the silver-haired bat.

Bats can be classified in two groups by their roosting habits: solitary-roosting and colony-roosting bats.

Solitary bats prefer to live in leaves, palm fronds, and Spanish moss. Resident bats in this category are the eastern red bat, the northern yellow bat, and the Seminole bat. Hoary bats are not considered residents, because they migrate to Mexico and South America to spend the winter, but are considered a native species.

The remaining species are considered to be colony-roosting bats. Darker than their solitary counterparts and less furry, these bats prefer to live under bridges, in tree holes or caves. Only three Florida species live in caves: the eastern pipistrelle, the gray bat and the southeastern myotis. Florida has the highest concentration of southeastern myotis in the world.

The greatest threat to bats in Florida is the disturbance or destruction of roost sites, due to either vandalism or urban development.

Common name	Scientific name authority	ASM state status and native range	Red list
Family Molossidae: free-tailed bats
Florida bonneted bat	Eumops floridanus (Allen, 1932)	rare, endemic to southern Florida	
Velvety free-tailed bat	Molossus molossus (Pallas, 1766)	rare; Lower Keys	
Mexican free-tailed bat	Tadarida brasiliensis (I. Geoffroy, 1824)	common, statewide except for Keys	
Family Mormoopidae
Antillean ghost-faced bat	Mormoops blainvillei (Leach, 1821)	rare, Lower Keys only	
Ghost-faced bat	Mormoops megalophylla (Peters, 1864)	extirpated	
Pristine mustached bat	Pteronotus pristinus (Silva-Taboada, 1974)	Extinct	
Family Phyllostomidae: leaf-nosed bats
Jamaican fruit bat	Artibeus jamaicensis (Leach, 1821)	rare, Lower Keys only	
Buffy flower bat	Erophylla sezekorni (Gundlach, 1860)	rare; Lower Keys	
Cuban flower bat	Phyllonycteris poeyi (Gundlach, 1860)	rare; Lower Keys	
Cuban fig-eating bat	Phyllops falcatus (Gray, 1839)	rare; Lower Keys	
Family Vespertilionidae: vesper bats
Rafinesque's big-eared bat	Corynorhinus rafinesquii Lesson, 1827	rare, statewide except southern tip of peninsula and Keys	
Big brown bat	Eptesicus fuscus (Beauvois, 1796)	common statewide except for Keys	
Silver-haired bat	Lasionycteris noctivagans (La Conte, 1831)	rare; known only from north Santa Rosa County and possibly north Nassau County	
Eastern red bat	Lasiurus borealis (Müller, 1776)	uncommon; panhandle and northern quarter of peninsula	
Hoary bat	Lasiurus cinereus (Beauvois, 1796)	uncommon, panhandle and northern half of peninsula	
Northern yellow bat	Lasiurus intermedius H. Allen, 1862	common statewide except southern tip of peninsula and Keys	
Seminole bat	Lasiurus seminolus (Rhoads, 1895)	common, statewide except southern tip of peninsula and Keys	
Southeastern myotis	Myotis austroriparius (Rhoads, 1897)	common; cave habitats in panhandle and, disjunct, northeastern and northcentral peninsula	
Gray bat	Myotis griscens A.H. Howell, 1909	rare, known only from panhandle, Marianna area	
Little brown bat	Myotis lucifugus (La Conte, 1831)	rare, known only from panhandle and Okaloosa County	
Northern long-eared myotis	Myotis septentrionalis (Trouessart, 1897)	rare/accidental or possibly extirpated, known only from panhandle, Marianna and Jackson counties	
Indiana bat	Myotis sodalis Miller & Allen, 1922	rare, known only from panhandle, Marianna and Jackson counties	
Evening bat	Nycticeius humeralis (Rafinesque, 1818)	uncommon; panhandle and northern quarter of peninsula	
Eastern pipistrelle	Perimyotis subflavus (F. Cuvier, 1832)	uncommon; panhandle and northern half of peninsula	

== Carnivorans ==
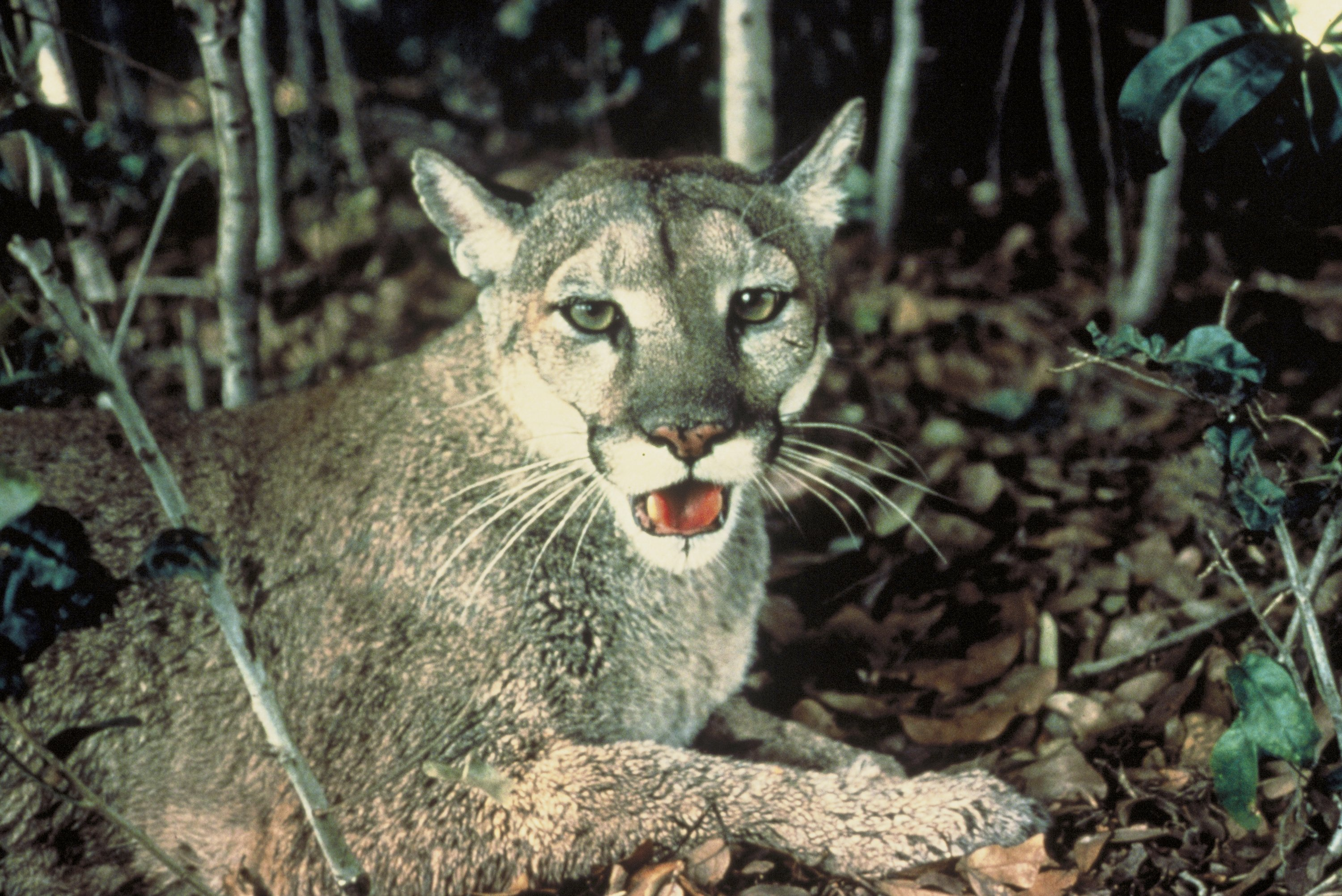
Florida panther

Coyotes arrived in northern Florida in the 1970s as their natural range expanded. Illegal releases, as well as the extirpation of the red wolf and gray wolf from the state, were factors in their occupation of the state. Coyotes are extremely adaptable, living in all types of forests and farms.

Florida has two types of foxes. The native gray fox can be found in the United States almost anywhere, except the northern plains and Rockies. It is sometimes confused with the red fox due to having patches of red hair. The red fox was introduced to Florida by hunting clubs, although it may have been native in the northern panhandle. Its preferred habitats are open areas, while the gray fox prefers woods.

Red wolves were once common throughout the southeastern US, including Florida. Extinct in the wild in 1980, it has been progressively introduced to select nature preserves. The present population was introduced as part of this recovery program in 1997 to the Saint Vincent National Refuge; once red wolf pups reach 18 months, they are relocated to the North Carolina portion of the program. A subspecies of red wolf, the Florida black wolf (Canis rufus floridanus) was also endemic to the state, but became extinct in the 19th century.

Bobcats are well adapted to urban development and are not a conservation concern. They make their home in hammocks, forests or swamps.

The Florida panther is a population of cougars found in Florida. It differs from other populations by having longer legs, a smaller size, and a shorter darker coat. The skull of the Florida panther is broader and flatter with highly arched nasal bones. Reportedly only seventy adult animals are alive, and a 1992 study estimated that the subspecies would become extinct between 2016 and 2055. It was chosen in 1982 as the Florida state animal by the state's schoolchildren.

Two of the eleven species of skunks live in Florida. Both the eastern spotted skunk and the striped skunk can be found statewide (except for the Keys).

Small populations of the Everglades mink (Neogale vison evergladensis), a subspecies of American mink, are encountered near Lake Okeechobee, and in the Big Cypress Swamp-Everglades National Park area.

North American river otters are a common sight close to freshwater streams in Florida. The population is increasing.

Raccoons are prevalent in the contiguous 48 states, including Florida. Adaptable to almost all kinds of habitats, they are among the few which actually benefit from human development, since food becomes more available. Attacks by predators like the bobcat cause minimum mortality, and the main reason for raccoon deaths is considered to be car accidents. They are predators of sea turtle nests.

The Florida black bear (Ursus americanus floridanus) is a subspecies of the American black bear. Differences between subspecies are very small; the Florida black bear has a highly arched forehead and a long and narrow braincase. Estimates for 2002 indicated the number of bears statewide to be between 2,000 and 3,200, indicating an increase from the previous census in 1998. The biggest cause of concern is roadkill, although the rates of mortality are equivalent to other areas in the country.

Florida does not have seal colonies, but stray seals come ashore in Florida occasionally. The most prevalent of those have been the common seal and the hooded seal, although a bearded seal was seen in 2007. The Caribbean monk seal was native to the Caribbean Sea and the Gulf of Mexico. Once a popular prey for Bahamas fishermen, their numbers diminished greatly in the 1800s. The last sighting of the species in Florida was in 1922, and specimens have not been seen anywhere since 1952.

Common name	Scientific name authority	ASM state status and native range	Red List
Family Felidae: felines
Ocelot	Leopardus pardalis (Linnaeus, 1758)	extirpated	
Bobcat	Lynx rufus (Schreber, 1777)	common; peninsula and northern Keys	
Jaguar	Panthera onca (Linnaeus, 1758)	extirpated	
Florida panther	Puma concolor (Linnaeus, 1771)	endemic and rare; restricted to Green Swamp and Big Cypress areas in SW peninsula	
Family Canidae: canines
Coyote	Canis latrans Say, 1823	uncommon or locally common statewide	
Gray wolf	Canis lupus Linnaeus, 1758	extirpated	
Red wolf	Canis rufus (Audubon & Bachman, 1851)	rare; introduced on St. Vincent Island, extirpated elsewhere	
Florida black wolf	C. r. floridanus Miller, 1912	extinct	
Gray fox	Urocyon cinereoargenteus (Schreber, 1775)	uncommon or locally common statewide	
Red fox	Vulpes vulpes (Linnaeus, 1758)	uncommon or locally common statewide	
Family Ursidae: bears
Black bear	Ursus americanus (Pallas, 1780)	rare or uncommon; localized populations statewide except Keys	
Family Procyonidae: raccoons and allies
Kinkajou	Potos flavus (Schreber, 1774)	introduced	
Common raccoon	Procyon lotor (Linnaeus, 1758)	abundant, statewide	
White-nosed coati	Nasua narica Linnaeus, 1766	introduced	
South American coati	Nasua nasua Linnaeus, 1766	introduced; Miami-Dade County	
Family Mustelidae: mustelids
Northern river otter	Lontra canadensis (Schreber, 1777)	locally common, mostly freshwater habitats, primarily rivers and streams, statewide except Keys	
European polecat	Mustela putorius Linnaeus, 1758	introduced	
Long-tailed weasel	Neogale frenata (Lichtenstein, 1831)	rare; statewide except Everglades and Keys	
American mink	Neogale vison (Schreber, 1777)	rare; coastal marshes in west Panhandle, Big Bend area, northeast area, and Everglades	
Family Mephitidae: skunks
American hog-nosed skunk	Conepatus leuconotus (Lichtenstein, 1832)	extirpated	
Striped skunk	Mephitis mephitis (Schreber, 1776)	common; statewide except Keys	
Eastern spotted skunk	Spilogale putorius (Linnaeus, 1758)	common; statewide except northeast corner and Keys	
Superfamily Pinnipedia: pinnipeds
Family Otariidae: eared seals
California sea lion	Zalophus californianus (Lesson, 1828)	introduced; accidental sightings had occurred in Florida's Gulf coast of wandering individuals from Mobile Bay, Alabama	
Family Phocidae: earless seals
Hooded seal	Cystophora cristata (Erxleben, 1777)	Vagrant	
Bearded seal	Erignathus barbatus (Erxleben, 1777)	Vagrant	
Caribbean monk seal	Neomonachus tropicalis (Erxleben, 1777)	extinct	
Gray seal	Halichoerus grypus (O. Fabricius, 1791)	Vagrant	
Harbor seal	Phoca vitulina (Linnaeus, 1758)	rare; east coastal marine areas to Central Florida	

== Cetaceans ==
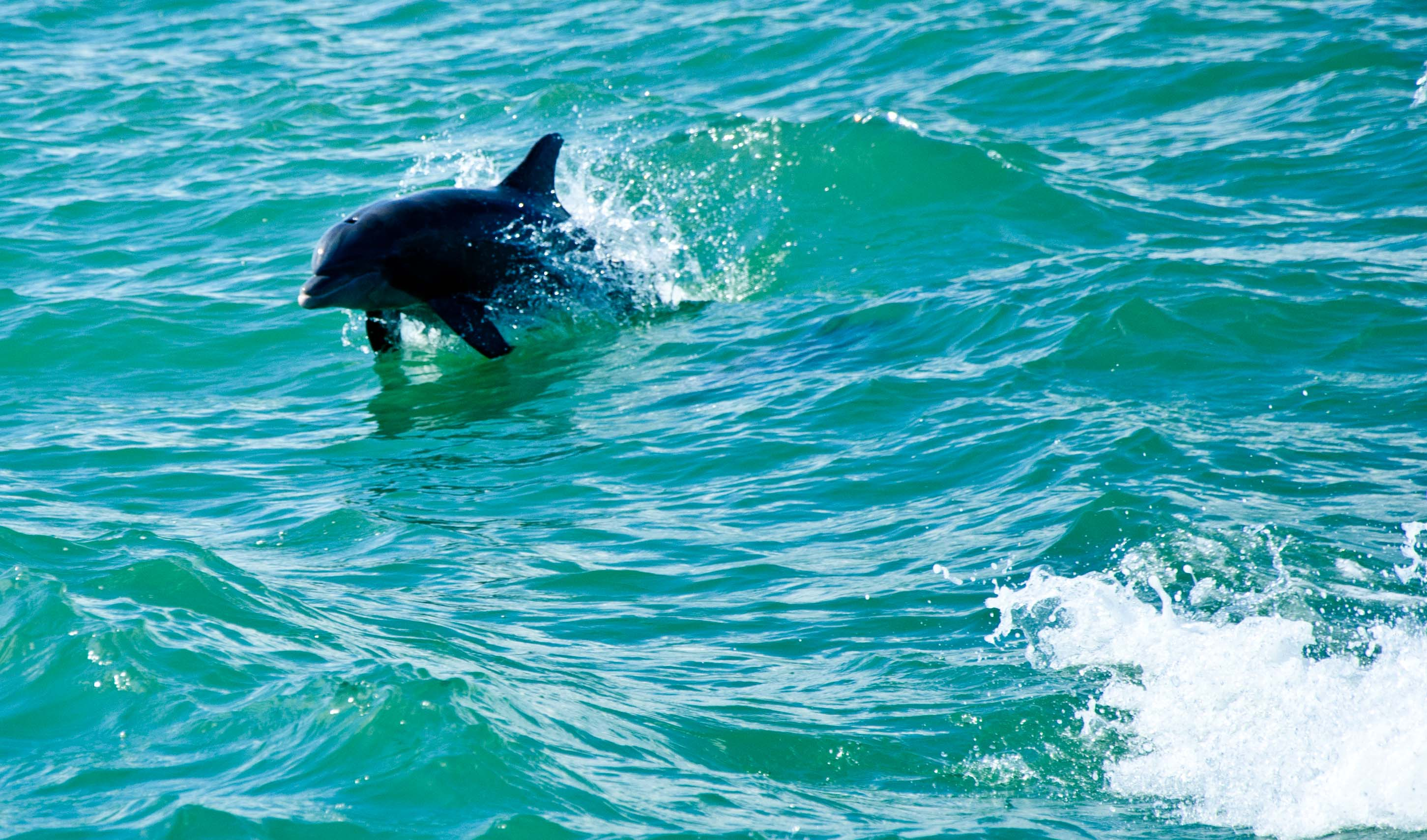
Common bottlenose dolphin in Boca Raton

Of the several whales seen close to Florida, the most frequent and notable visitor is the North Atlantic right whale. Named as such because they were the "right" whales to kill, their only known calving ground is located off the coasts of Georgia and Florida. Pregnant females migrate from feeding grounds located far north and deliver calves from mid-December to March. Humpback whales are also re-colonizing the area while gray whales, once cavorting off Florida for the same reasons as the right whales, were extirpated from the Atlantic in the 17th and 18th centuries.

The most common dolphin in the state is the common bottlenose dolphin. Dolphins, like manatees, are vulnerable to red tide and have mass fatalities when one occurs. Dolphins were designated the Florida state saltwater mammal in 1975.

Common name	Scientific name authority	ASM state status and native range	Red List
Family Balaenidae: right whales
Southern right whale	Eubalaena australis (Desmoulins, 1822)	vagrant; Atlantic coast	
North Atlantic right whale	Eubalaena glacialis (Linnaeus, 1758)	regular migrant (in very small number)	
Family Balaenopteridae: rorquals
Common minke whale	Balaenoptera acutorostrata Lacépède, 1804	rare	
Sei whale	Balaenoptera borealis (Lesson, 1828)	rare	
Rice's whale	Balaenoptera ricei Rosel et al., 2021	resident	
Bryde's whale	Balaenoptera brydei Anderson, 1878	rare	
Blue whale	Balaenoptera musculus (Linnaeus, 1758)	rare	
Fin whale	Balaenoptera physalus (Linnaeus, 1758)	rare	
Humpback whale	Megaptera novaeangliae (Borowski, 1781)	common (in small numbers)	
Family Eschrichtiidae: gray whales
Gray whale	Eschrichtius robustus (Lilljebor, 1861)	extirpated; however in December 2023, a rare sighting of the species was seen at Sunny Isles Beach, which is considered to be the first rediscovered gray whale in Florida since the 18th century	
Family Physeteridae: sperm whales
Sperm whale	Physeter macrocephalus (Linnaeus, 1758)	rare	
Family Kogiidae: dwarf sperm whales
Pygmy sperm whale	Kogia breviceps (Blainville, 1838)	uncommon	
Dwarf sperm whale	Kogia sima (Owen, 1866)	uncommon	
Family Ziphidae: beaked whales
Northern bottlenose whale	Hyperoodon ampullatus (Forster, 1770)	rare; Atlantic coast	
Sowerby's beaked whale	Mesoplodon bidens Sowerby, 1804	rare; Gulf coast	
Blainville's beaked whale	Mesoplodon densirostris (Blainville, 1817)	rare	
Gervais' beaked whale	Mesoplodon europaeus (Gervais, 1855)	rare	
True's beaked whale	Mesoplodon mirus (True, 1913)	rare; Atlantic coast south to Flagler County	
Cuvier's beaked whale	Ziphius cavirostris (G. Cuvier, 1823)	rare	
Family Phocoenidae: porpoises
Harbor porpoise	Phocoena phocoena (Linnaeus, 1758)	rare; east coastal marine areas to North Florida	
Family Delphinidae: oceanic dolphins
Short-beaked common dolphin	Delphinus delphis (Gray, 1828)	rare	
Pygmy killer whale	Feresa attenuata (Gray, 1875)	rare	
Short-finned pilot whale	Globicephala macrorhynchus Gray, 1846	rare	
Risso's dolphin	Grampus griseus (G. Cuvier, 1812)	rare	
Fraser's dolphin	Lagenodelphis hosei (Fraser, 1956)	rare;	
Killer whale	Orcinus orca (Linnaeus, 1758)	rare though last sighting of the orcas where in the Florida Keys off Key Largo in July 2023. & again spotted migrating from the coast of Fort Pierce to Vero Beach on September 12, 2023.	
Melon-headed whale	Peponocephala electra (Gray, 1846)	rare	
False killer whale	Pseudorca crassidens (Owen, 1846)	rare	
Pantropical spotted dolphin	Stenella attenuata (Gray, 1846)	rare	
Clymene dolphin	Stenella clymene (Gray, 1846)	rare	
Striped dolphin	Stenella coeruleoalba (Meyen, 1833)	rare	
Atlantic spotted dolphin	Stenella frontalis (G. Cuvier, 1829)	rare	
Spinner dolphin	Stenella longirostris (Gray, 1828)	rare	
Rough-toothed dolphin	Steno bredanensis (G. Cuvier in Lesson, 1828)	rare	
Common bottlenose dolphin	Tursiops truncatus (Montagu, 1821)	common; coastal	
Tamanend's bottlenose dolphin	Tursiops erebennus (Cope, 1865)	rare; coastal	

== Even-toed ungulates ==
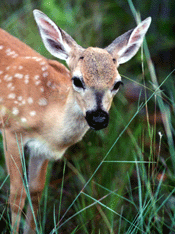
Key deer

The only native even-toed ungulate is the white-tailed deer. It is the most economically important hunting mammal in all of North America, and is one of the major prey animals of the Florida panther. There were only about 20,000 deer in Florida during the late 1930s, and the species was almost extinct in South Florida due to a campaign to eliminate tick-borne diseases. Hunt restraining measures and purchases from other states were very successful bringing the population to more than 700,000 deer statewide. A smaller subspecies, the Key deer, lives only in the Keys and numbers around 800 animals. Sambar deer were introduced in 1908 as alternative game for hunters on Saint Vincent Island. The population is between 700 and 1,000; 130 hunters are licensed per year, and each can kill up to two deer. Some red deer were released from a hunting ranch around 1967 and may still exist as a small herd.

Wild boar found their way to Florida in 1539 with Spanish colonist Hernando de Soto. Florida has 12% of the three million boars that roam in the US. They are a popular hunting prey, but are regarded as a pest, due to the damage they inflict to agriculture and environment. More than 21,000 boar were killed in 1980 alone.

Common name	Scientific name authority	ASM state status and native range	Red List
Family Cervidae: deer
Chital	Axis axis (Erxleben, 1777)	introduced; uncommon	
Elk	Cervus canadensis (Erxleben, 1777)	introduced, possibly extirpated	
Red deer	Cervus elaphus Linnaeus, 1758	introduced; single population in Highlands County	
Sika deer	Cervus nippon Temminck, 1838	introduced	
White-tailed deer	Odocoileus virginianus (Zimmerman, 1780)	common statewide; rare in Keys	
Key deer	O. v. clavium Barbour & G. M. Allen, 1922	only in Everglades or Keys	
Barasingha	Rucervus duvaucelii G. Cuvier, 1823	introduced	
Sambar deer	Rusa unicolor (Kerr, 1792)	introduced on St. Vincent Island	
Family Bovidae: bovids
American bison	Bison bison (Linnaeus, 1758)	reintroduced on Paynes Prairie Preserve	
Nilgai	Boselaphus tragocamelus (Pallas, 1766)	introduced	
Family Suidae: pigs
Common warthog	Phacochoerus africanus (Gmelin, 1788)	introduced	
Wild boar	Sus scrofa Linnaeus, 1758	introduced; common	
Family Antilocapridae: pronghorns
Pronghorn	Antilocapra americana (Ord, 1815)	introduced, presumably extirpated; Osceola County	
Family Tayassuidae: peccaries
Collared peccary	Dicotyles tajacu (Linnaeus, 1758)	extirpated	

== Marsupials ==
The Virginia opossum is the only marsupial found in North America north of the Rio Grande. It lives in wooded areas and can be easily found statewide.

Common name	Scientific name authority	ASM state status and native range	Red List
Family Didelphidae: New World opossums
Virginia opossum	Didelphis virginiana (Kerr, 1792)	common; statewide	

== Armadillos ==
Cingulata are represented by the nine-banded armadillo, having migrated from Texas. Subsequent introductions and fast breeding spread the species statewide.

Common name	Scientific name authority	ASM state status and native range	Red List
Family Dasypodidae: armadillos
Nine-banded armadillo	Dasypus novemcinctus Linnaeus, 1758	common; statewide, except possibly some parts of Everglades	

== Anteaters and tamanduas ==
The Myrmecophagidae are a family of anteaters, the name is derived from the Ancient Greek words for 'ant' and 'eat'. Two genera and three species are in the family, consisting of the giant anteater, and the tamanduas.

Common name	Scientific name authority	ASM state status and native range	Red List
Family Myrmecophagidae
Northern tamandua	Tamandua mexicana (Saussure, 1860)	introduced; Miami-Dade County	

== Primates ==
Six rhesus macaques were introduced sometime in the 1930s as tourist attractions, confined to an island in a Central Florida river and flourished. Charles River Laboratories, the world's biggest producer of lab animals, maintained a free-range colony until 1999, when they were forced to remove the animals after they destroyed parts of the mangrove forests in Key Haven. Other primates with reported sightings not included in this list are crab-eating macaques and squirrel monkeys.

Common name	Scientific name authority	ASM state status and native range	Red List
Family Cercopithecidae: Old World monkeys
Vervet monkey	Chlorocebus pygerythrus (F. Cuvier, 1821)	introduced; Dania Beach and Fort Lauderdale area.	
Rhesus macaque	Macaca mulatta (Zimmermann, 1780)	introduced; Ocala and Silver Springs area	
Family Lemuridae: lemurs
Ring-tailed lemur	Lemur catta Linnaeus, 1758	introduced	

== Lagomorphs ==
All the confirmed lagomorphs in Florida are nocturnal; the black-tailed jackrabbit—introduced as a training tool for racing greyhounds from 1930 to 1950; the native eastern cottontail, which can be found anywhere but in forests and coastal marshes; and the marsh rabbit, which prefers freshwater and brackish marshes. The subspecies Lower Keys marsh rabbit has the scientific name Sylvilagus palustris hefneri after Hugh Hefner—because research on the subspecies was financed in part by the Playboy Foundation.

Common name	Scientific name authority	ASM state status and native range	Red List
Family Leporidae: rabbits and hares
Black-tailed jackrabbit	Lepus californicus (Gray, 1837)	introduced; established in Homestead area	
Swamp rabbit	Sylvilagus aquaticus (Bachman, 1837)	rare and unconfirmed; possibly present in Escambia County but no known records	
Eastern cottontail	Sylvilagus floridanus (J. A. Allen, 1890)	common; statewide except Keys	
Marsh rabbit	Sylvilagus palustris (Bachman, 1837)	common; statewide	
Lower Keys marsh rabbit	S. p. hefneri (Lazell, 1984)	Florida Keys	

== Rodents ==
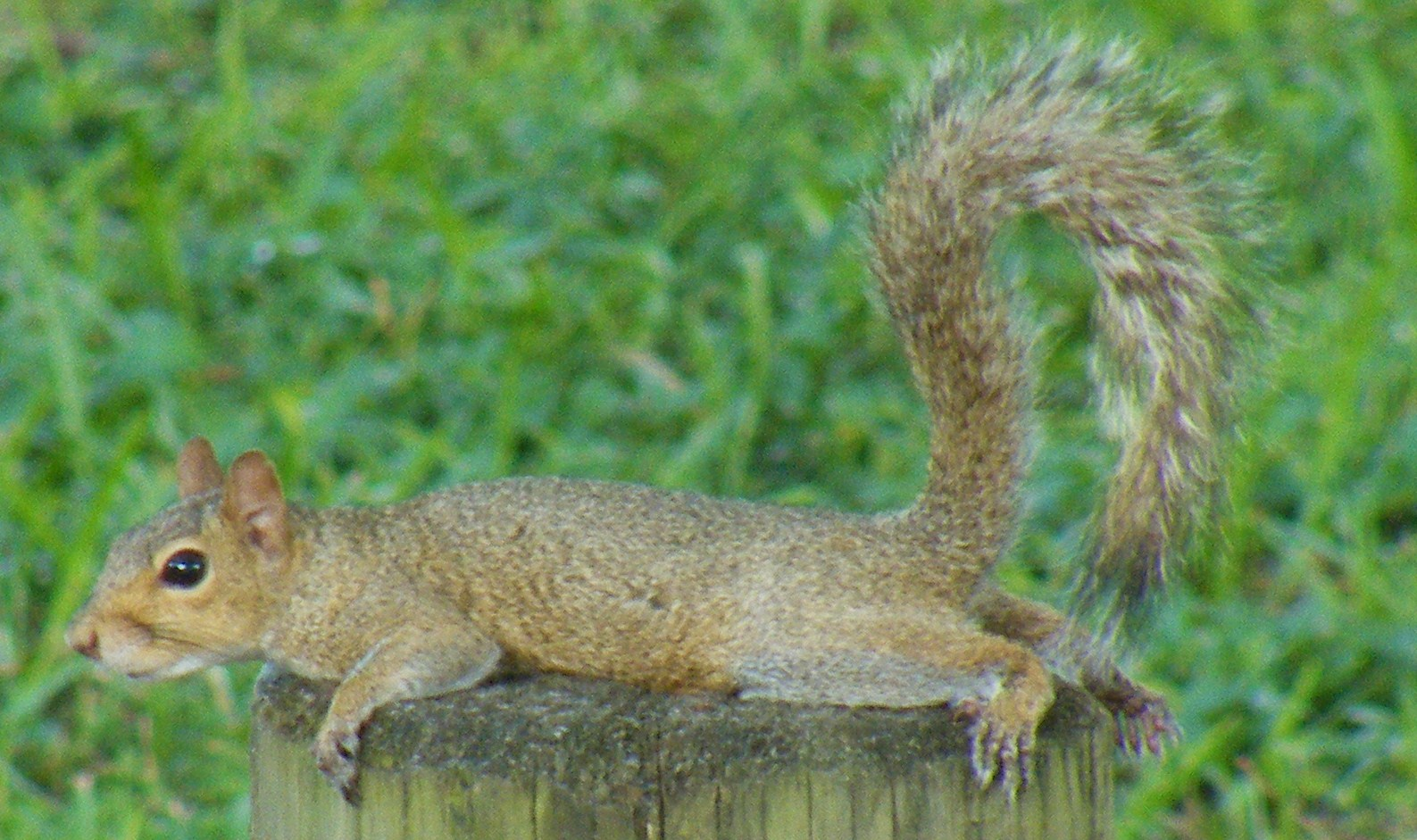
Eastern gray squirrel in Tampa

Of the several species of rodents in Florida, the subspecies of oldfield mouse are the biggest conservation concern, along with the Florida mouse and Florida salt marsh vole. Six of eight subspecies of the oldfield mouse (commonly named 'beach mice') are in endangered status, and one is extinct. Given causes for their demise is predators like cats and red foxes and destruction of their natural habitats. The Florida mouse is on the endangered species list because of destruction of their habitat. The Florida bonneted bat, Florida mouse and Florida salt marsh vole are the only mammal species endemic to Florida. The mouse depends on the gopher tortoise (also endangered) for its survival, because it makes its burrows from tortoise burrows, or in the absence of those, oldfield mouse burrows.

Non-native species brought in boats by colonizers are the black rat, brown rat and house mouse. Other non-natives are the capybara, the nutria and the Mexican gray squirrel.

Common name	Scientific name authority	ASM state status and native range	Red List
Family Castoridae: beavers
American beaver	Castor canadensis (Kuhl, 1820)	common; panhandle and northern third of peninsula, except coastal areas.	
Family Sciuridae: squirrels
Southern flying squirrel	Glaucomys volans (Linnaeus, 1758)	common; statewide except Keys and possibly southwest peninsula	
Groundhog	Marmota monax (Linnaeus, 1758)	rare	
Mexican gray squirrel	Sciurus aureogaster F. Cuvier, 1829	introduced; established on Elliott Key	
Eastern gray squirrel	Sciurus carolinensis (Gmelin, 1788)	common; statewide except Lower Keys	
Fox squirrel	Sciurus niger (Linnaeus, 1758)	rare; statewide except Keys; possibly extinct in southeastern peninsula	
Eastern chipmunk	Tamias striatus (Linnaeus, 1758)	uncommon; northern half of western panhandle in mesic forest areas	
American red squirrel	Tamiasciurus hudsonicus (Erxleben, 1777)	rare	
Family Geomyidae: pocket gophers
Plains pocket gopher	Geomys bursarius (Shaw, 1800)	rare	
Southeastern pocket gopher	Geomys pinetis (Rafinesque, 1817)	common; panhandle and northern half of peninsula	
Goff's pocket gopher	G. p. goffi Sherman, 1944	extinct; once endemic to Brevard County	
Family Zapodidae: jumping mice
Woodland jumping mouse	Napaeozapus insignis (Miller, 1891)	rare	
Family Cricetidae: voles, muskrats
Eastern harvest mouse	Reithrodontomys humulis (Audubon & Bachman, 1941)	common; panhandle and northern two thirds of peninsula in old fields, grasslands, and fields	
Florida salt marsh vole	Microtus dukecampbelli (Woods, Post, and Kilpatrick, 1982)	rare; endemic to salt marshes in Waccasassa Bay in Levy County	
Woodland vole	Microtus pinetorum (Le Conte, 1830)	uncommon; central portion of northern third of peninsula	
Round-tailed muskrat	Neofiber alleni (True, 1884)	common; peninsula and isolated populations in Apalachicola and Okefenokee areas	
Florida woodrat	Neotoma floridana (Ord, 1818)	uncommon; panhandle, northern two thirds of peninsula and rare; Key Largo	
Key Largo woodrat	Neotoma floridana smalli (Sherman, 1955)	Endangered in Key Largo	
Golden mouse	Ochrotomys nuttalli (Harlan, 1832)	rare; panhandle and northern half of peninsula	
Muskrat	Ondatra zibethicus (Linnaeus, 1766)	common; northwestern half of panhandle	
Marsh rice rat	Oryzomys palustris (Harlan, 1837)	common; statewide	
Cotton mouse	Peromyscus gossypinus (Le Conte, 1850)	common; statewide in forests and mixed forest/grasslands	
Key Largo cotton mouse	P. g. allapaticola (Schwartz, 1952)	endemic to Key Largo	
Chadwick Beach cotton mouse	P. g. restrictus (A.H. Howell, 1939)	extinct; once endemic to the Chadwick Beach area of Manasota Key	
Oldfield mouse	Peromyscus polionotus (Wagner, 1843)	common; several endemic subspecies (see below)	
Pallid beach mouse	P. p. decoloratus (A.H. Howell, 1939)	extinct; once endemic to Ponce Park in Volusia County and Bulow in Flagler County	
Anastasia Island beach mouse	P. p. phasma (Bangs, 1898)	endemic to Anastasia Island in St. Augustine, Florida	
Perdido Key beach mouse	P. p. trissyllepsis (Bowen, 1968)	endemic to Perdido Key, Florida	
Florida mouse	Podomys floridanus (Chapman, 1889)	rare; central peninsula, mostly in habitats along central ridges.	
Hispid cotton rat	Sigmodon hispidus Say & Ord, 1825	common; statewide	
Family Muridae: murids
House mouse	Mus musculus Linnaeus, 1758	introduced; common; statewide	
Brown rat	Rattus norvegicus (Berkenhout, 1769)	introduced; common; statewide	
Black rat	Rattus rattus (Linnaeus, 1758)	introduced; common statewide	
Family Nesomyidae: nesomyids
Gambian pouched rat	Cricetomys gambianus Waterhouse, 1840	introduced; Keys	
Family Myocastoridae: nutrias
Nutria	Myocastor coypus (Molina, 1782)	introduced; Duval County and panhandle populations; possibly established statewide except Keys	
Family Caviidae: cavies
Patagonian mara	Dolichotis patagonum (Zimmermann, 1780)	introduced	
Capybara	Hydrochoerus hydrochaeris (Linnaeus, 1766)	introduced; while no breeding population has been confirmed, sightings still occur. While it is considered an invasive species, some claim that it may serve as a proxy of the Pleistocene species.	
Family Dasyproctidae: agoutis and acouchis
Red-rumped agouti	Dasyprocta leporina (Linnaeus, 1766)	introduced; Miami-Dade County	

== Shrews and moles ==
Four species of shrews (eulipotyphlans) are found across Florida. Two known subspecies are the Homosassa shrew (Sorex longirostris eionis) and Sherman's short-tailed shrew (Blarina carolinensis shermanii). One of their main predators is the cat. Completing the Eulipotyphla are two species of moles.

Common name	Scientific name authority	ASM state status and native range	Red List
Family Soricidae: shrews
Southern short-tailed shrew	Blarina carolinensis (Bachman, 1837)	common; statewide except for Keys	
North American least shrew	Cryptotis parva (Say, 1823)	common; statewide except for Keys	
Everglades short-tailed shrew	Blarina peninsulae (Merriam, 1895)	common; peninsular	
Southeastern shrew	Sorex longirostris Bachman, 1837	uncommon; north, south through Central Florida	
Family Talpidae: moles
Star-nosed mole	Condylura cristata (Linnaeus, 1758)	rare; Okefenokee Swamp area and possibly in Leon County	
Eastern mole	Scalopus aquaticus (Linnaeus, 1758)	common; statewide except for Keys	

== Sirenia ==
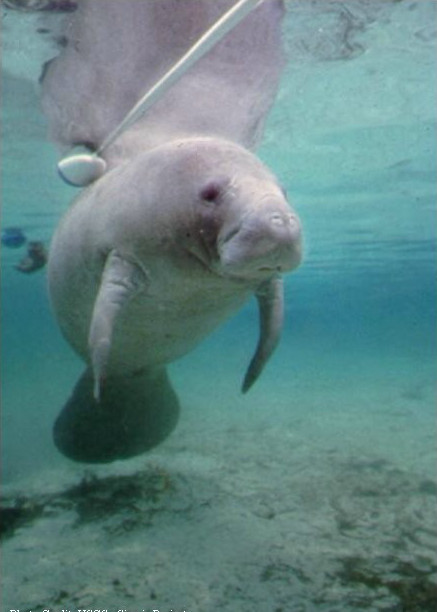
West Indian manatee

Trichechus manatus latirostris is one of the two subspecies of the West Indian manatee. This herbivorous aquatic mammal lives in rivers, springs and shallow coastal waters. It was designated the state marine mammal in 1975 and is protected by federal and state laws. Threatened by habitat loss, entanglements in fishing gear and crab traps, or by being asphyxiated or crushed by canal locks and flood gates, the most common cause for manatee deaths is being struck by boats, which caused one quarter of all deaths recorded since 1974. In 2015, the statewide population was estimated at 6,063.

Common name	Scientific name authority	ASM state status and native range	Red List
Family Sirenia: sea cows
West Indian manatee	Trichechus manatus (Linnaeus, 1758)	rare; coastal marine areas, but not usually north of the Suwannee River in the Gulf of Mexico; enters rivers and connected springs common; peninsula and northern Keys.	

== See also ==
- List of amphibians of Florida
- List of birds of Florida
- List of fishes of Florida
- List of reptiles of Florida
- List of snakes of Florida
- List of invasive species in Florida
- List of invasive species in the Everglades
- Species reintroduction
- List of North American animals extinct in the Holocene
- Fauna of Florida
