= Lignumvitae Key Botanical State Park =

Archaeological site in Florida, United States

- IUCN category IV (habitat/species management area)
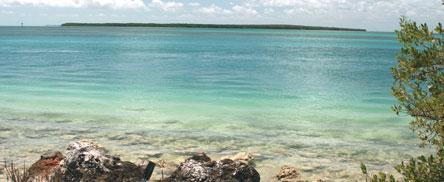
- A view from the shore

- Location within Florida Location within the United States
- Interactive map of Lignumvitae Key Botanical State Park
- Location: Monroe County, Florida, USA
- Nearest city: Islamorada, Florida
- Coordinates: 24°54′7.18″N 80°41′57.56″W
- Area: 10,818 acres (43.78 km^{2})
- Established: 1971
- Governing body: Florida Department of Environmental Protection

U.S. National Natural Landmark
- Designated: October 1968

Lignumvitae Key Botanical State Park is a Florida State Park consisting of Lignumvitae Key, Shell Key, surrounding submerged lands, and a parcel at the northern end of Lower Matecumbe Key. The islands are located one mile west of U.S. 1 (Overseas Highway) at mile marker 78.5, and can be reached only by private boat or tour boat.

Lignumvitae Key was designated a National Natural Landmark by the National Park Service in 1968, recognizing the tropical hardwood hammock on the island.

The park includes Lignumvitae Key (287 acres [116 ha]), Shell Key (203 acres [82 ha]), a parcel of (11 acres [4 ha]) on Lower Matecumbe Key, three parcels of mangrove forest adjacent to Upper Matecumbe Key and Lower Matecumbe Key, totaling 267 acres (108 ha), and 9,958 acres (40 km^{2}) of submerged land, primarily on the Florida Bay side of the Matecumbe Keys, but extending between Upper Matecumbe Key and Lower Matecumbe Key into the Atlantic Ocean.

The park is managed jointly with the Indian Key State Historic Site, the Shell Key Preserve State Park, and the San Pedro Underwater Archaeological Preserve State Park.

The state park largely overlaps the 6,700 acres (27 km^{2}) Lignumvitae Key Aquatic Preserve, which was designated by the state in 1969.

== Flora ==
Most of the island is covered by a Tropical hardwood hammock consisting of about 60 species of threes and shrubs, almost all of which originated in the Caribbean bioregion. Trees found on the island include holywood lignum-vitae (Guaiacum sanctum), false mastic (Sideroxylon foetidissimum), Florida strangler fig (Ficus aurea), poisonwood (Metopium toxiferum), pigeonplum (Coccoloba diversifolia) and gumbo-limbo (Bursera simaruba).

== Fauna ==
Thirty-five species of butterfly have been found on the island, all of which occur elsewhere in the Florida Keys. Twenty-two of the butterfly species are resident and breed on the island. Key Largo woodrats (Neotoma floridana smalli) and Key Largo cotton mice (Peromyscus gossypinus allapaticola) were introduced on the island in the 1970s and became established. Among the park's wildlife are a variety of shore, wading and migratory birds.

== History ==
Lignumvitae Key has also been known as Cayo de la Leña (in the Spanish Florida period), Jenkinson Key (during British rule), and Lignurd Vetoz (in the early and middle 19th century), before becoming known by its present name sometime in the late 19th century.

Lignumvitae Key, as part of the upper and middle Florida Keys, is composed of Key Largo Limestone, a fossilized coral reef formed hundreds of thousands of years ago when the sea level was higher than today. The flora on the island is typical of the Bahamas and West Indies, as the result of seeds being brought to the island by wind, water and migrating birds. Shell Key is a mangrove island.

A wealthy chemist from Miami, William John Matheson, bought the island in 1919. He built a small home, with a windmill to supply power and a cistern to capture fresh rainwater. The renovated building is now the visitor center for the park. The house has concrete arches supporting a second story built of Dade County pine, and its exterior is decorated with limestone from the island.

The State of Florida acquired Lignumvitae Island in 1971. It has since added several parcels to the park.

== Activities ==
Hour-long guided walks occur twice daily, Friday - Sunday. There is no fishing or swimming allowed off the dock or within 100 feet of it. No more than 50 people are permitted on the Key at one time - 25 on the trail and 25 in the clearing. Visitors are warned to bring shoes and mosquito repellent.

== Hours ==
The park is open from 8:00 a.m. till 4:00 p.m. daily except Tuesday and Wednesday.

Tours are given only on Friday, Saturday and Sunday at 10am and 2pm December thru April.

== Sources ==
- Leston, Dennis; Smith, David Spencer; Lenczyweski, Batbara (1982). "Habitat, diversity and immigration in a tropical island fauna: the butterflies of Lignumvitae Key, Florida" (PDF). Journal of the Lepidopterists' Society. 36 (4): 241–255.
- Lignumvitae Key Botanical State Park Approved Unit Management Plan (UMP) (PDF) (Report). April 23, 2012.
