= Dagny Johnson Key Largo Hammock Botanical State Park =

State park in Florida, United States

- IUCN category V (protected landscape/seascape)
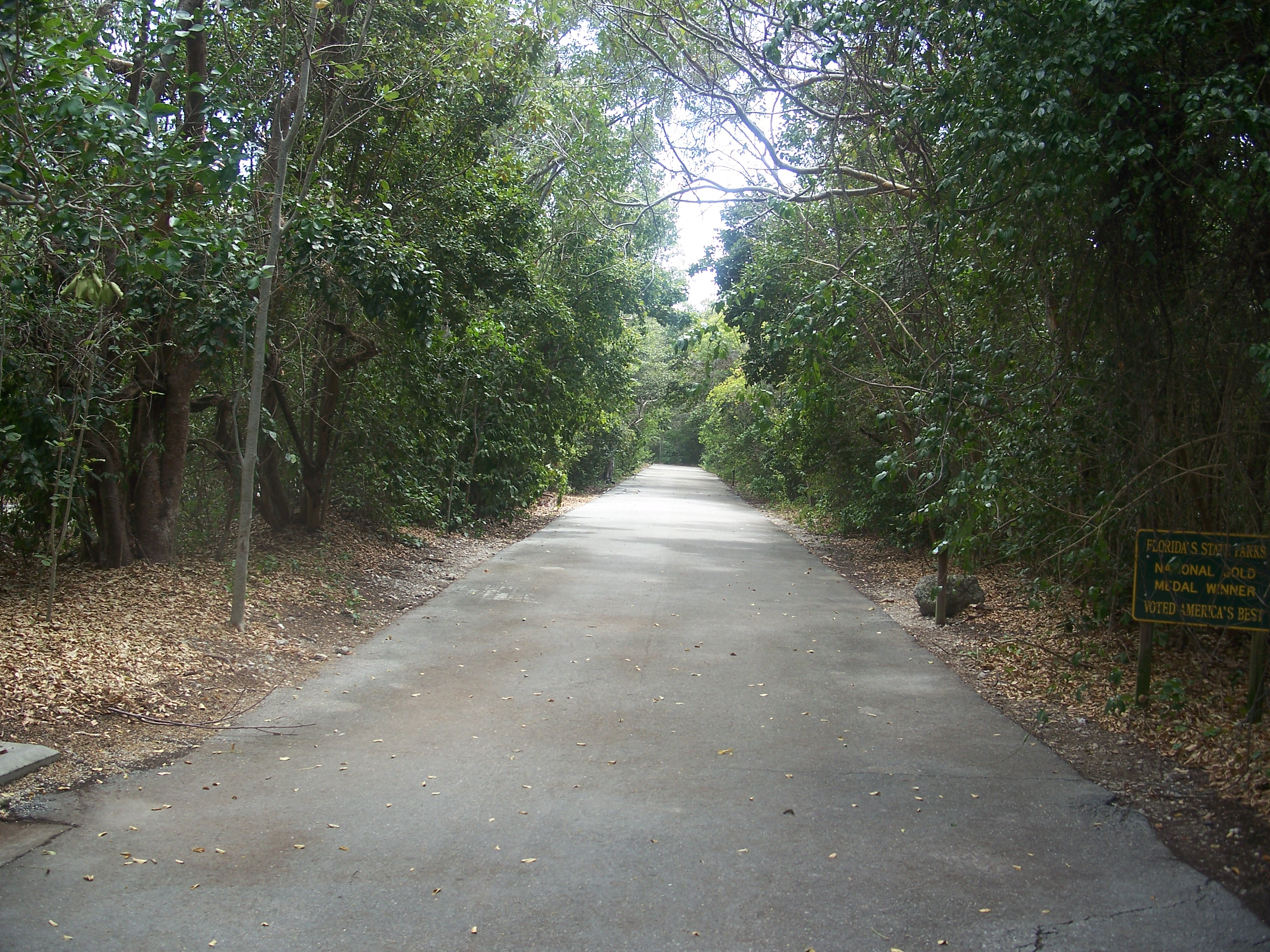
- Trail through the park

- Location within Florida Location within the United States
- Interactive map of Dagny Johnson Key Largo Hammock Botanical State Park
- Location: Monroe County, Florida, US
- Nearest city: Key Largo, Florida
- Coordinates: 25°10′32″N 80°22′08″W
- Governing body: Florida Department of Environmental Protection

The Dagny Johnson Key Largo Hammock Botanical State Park is a Florida State Park, located in the center of Key Largo in the Florida Keys, on County Road 905, one-quarter mile north of its intersection with the Overseas Highway (US 1).

== Overview ==
The park is named in honor of Dagny Johnson, a local environmental activist. The park is constructed on land bought up in 1982 after the financial demise of Port Bougainville, a project which would have included 15 hotels and over 2000 condos.

=== Flora and Fauna ===
The park is an important habitat for the threatened Key Largo Woodrat and the Key Largo Cotton Mouse, which are found only in this part of Key Largo: 90% of these animals' habitat is in the Dagny Johnson Park and the adjacent Crocodile Lake National Wildlife Refuge.

Dagny Johnson contains one of the largest tracts of West Indian tropical hardwood hammock in the United States.

The park supports 84 protected plant and animal species, including wild cotton, mahogany mistletoe and the American crocodile.

== Admission and hours ==
There is a $2.50 per person entrance fee. Florida state parks are open between 8 a.m. and sundown every day of the year (including holidays).

== Gallery ==
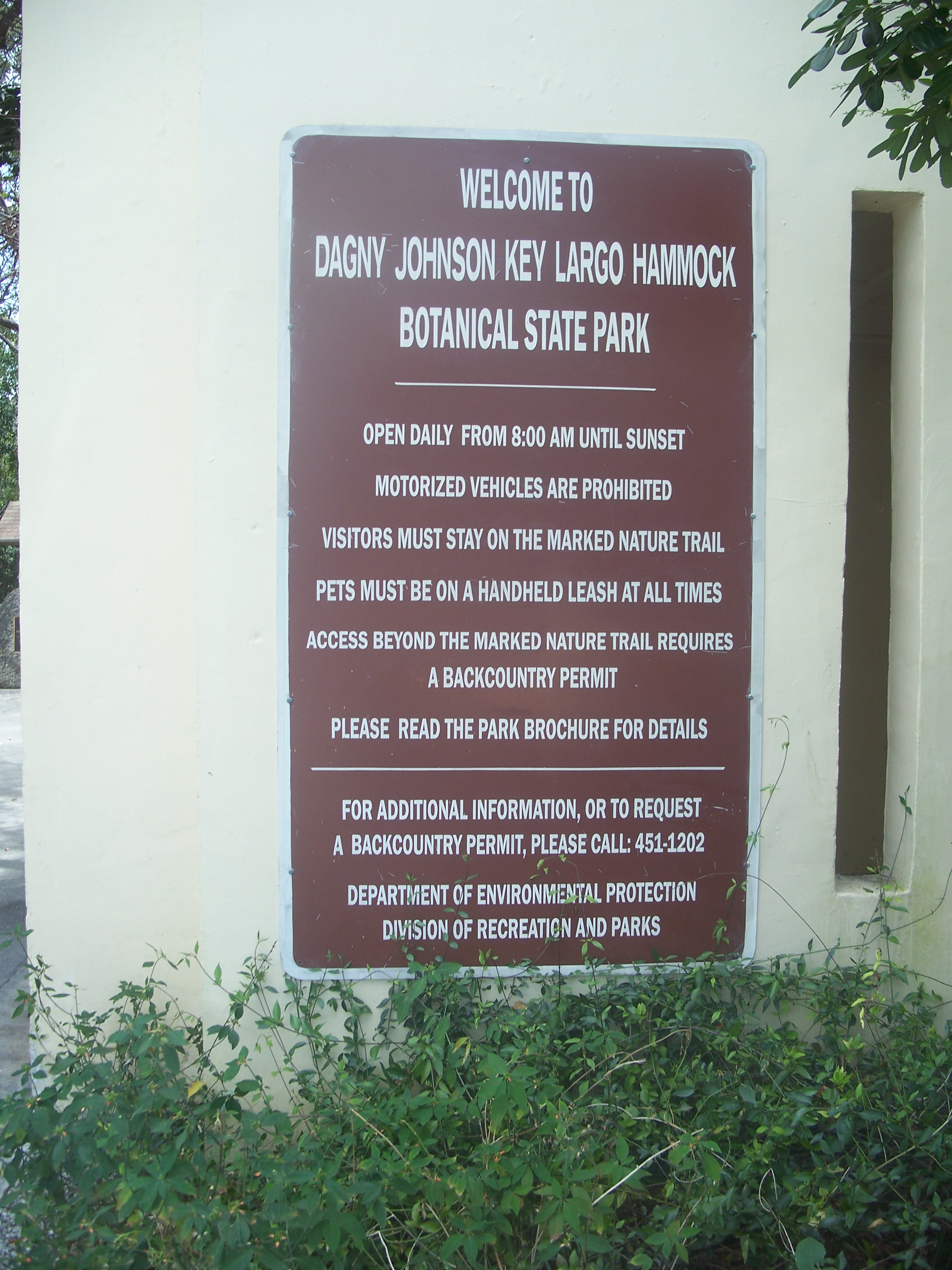
Sign

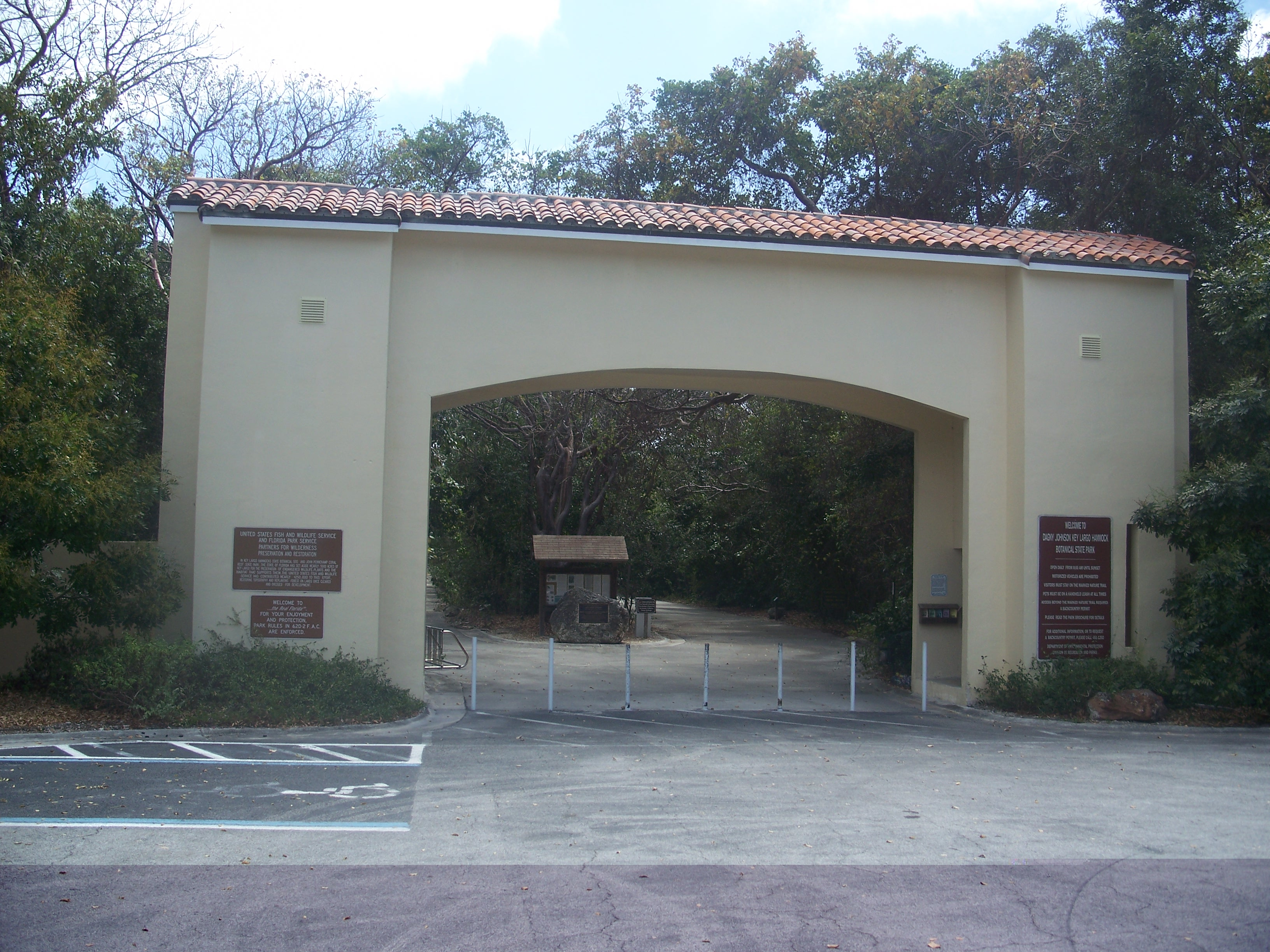
Archway
