= Lignumvitae Key =

Island in the upper Florida Keys, United States

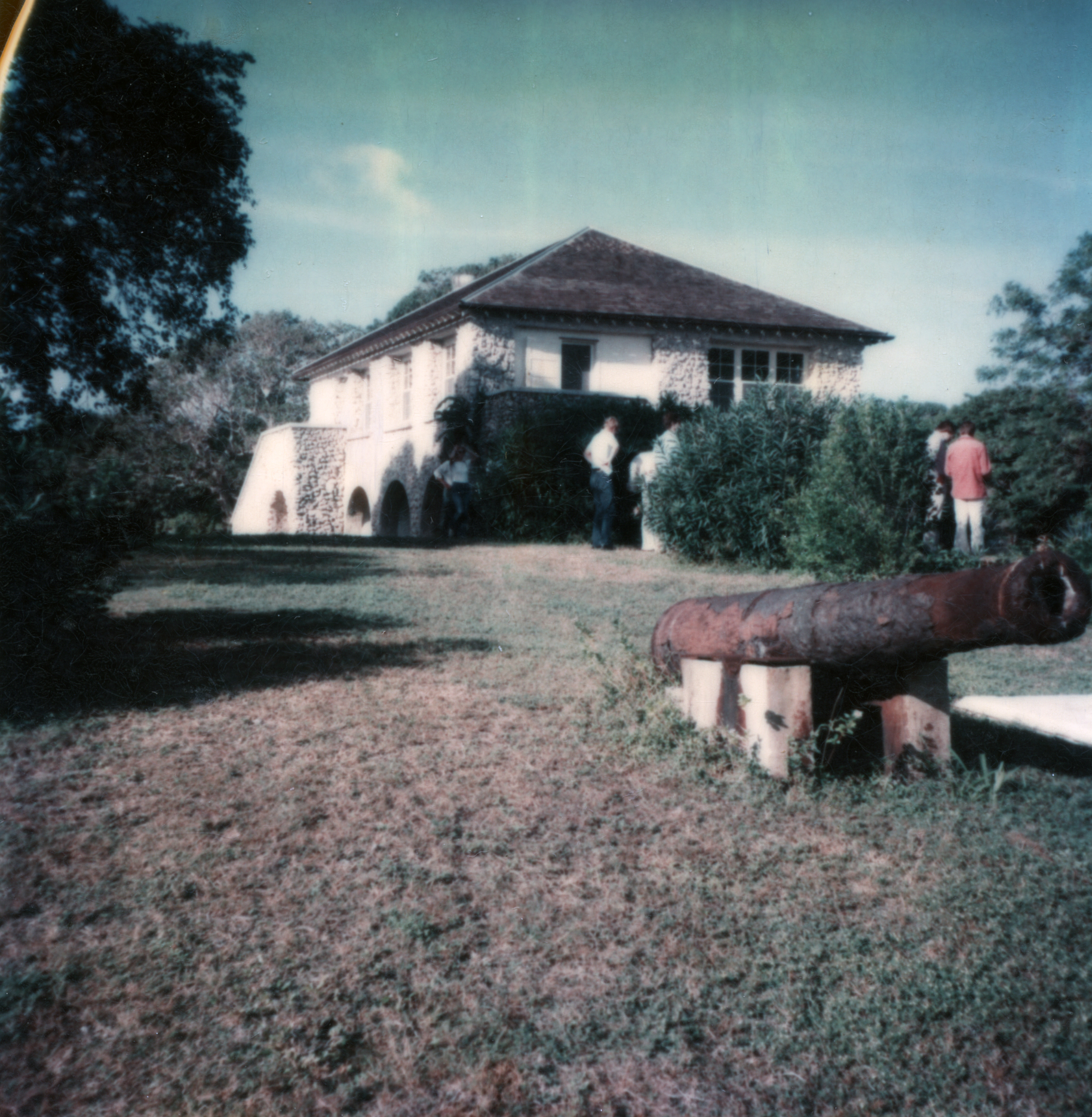
- House on Lignumvitae Key, December 1977

- Lignumvitae Key Lignumvitae Key (the Caribbean)

Geography
- Location: Florida Keys
- Coordinates: 24.902°N 80.699°W

Administration
- United States
- State: Florida
- County: Monroe

- Lignumvitae Key Archaeological and Historical District
- U.S. National Register of Historic Places
- Nearest city: Islamorada, Florida
- NRHP reference No.: 98000652
- Added to NRHP: February 16, 1999

Lignumvitae Key is an island in the upper Florida Keys.

It is located due north of, and less than one mile from the easternmost tip of Lower Matecumbe Key. The island has been designated a National Natural Landmark, and an Archeological and Historical District, and is part of the Lignumvitae Key Botanical State Park and the Lignumvitae Key Aquatic Preserve.

The island has the Keys' highest point above sea level of 19 feet (5.8 m), which beats the island of Key West's Solares Hill by 1 foot (30 cm). This dark green island is covered in rare tropical hardwoods such as the island's namesake, Holywood Lignum-vitae (Guaiacum sanctum).

== Archaeology ==
Three features on the island have been assigned archaeological identifiers by the State of Florida: a burial mound (8MO00013), a stone structure (8MO00014), and a stone wall (8MO00001446), while the island as a whole has received the identifier 8MO00210. The burial mound is 30 metres (98 ft) in diameter, and 1 metre (3.3 ft) high. Although local belief was that it had been a Spanish structure, it is now presumed to date from the Glades archaeological culture, which lasted from about 500 BCE until shortly after the arrival of Europeans in Florida. Archaeologists place the Florida Keys in the Tekesta or Everglades region of the Glades archaeological culture area.

The archaeological record for Lignumvitae Key is limited. The Spanish called the people living in the area in the 16th and 17th centuries "Matecumbes". John Goggin investigated the burial mound, composed of coral sand, in 1940. He described the mound as 50 feet (15 m) in diameter and 3.5 feet (1.1 m) high. He noted that the storm surge from the 1935 Labor Day hurricane had washed over the mound, but the mound was not badly damaged. He observed fragments of human bones on the surface of the mound, but no artefacts. He was unable to observe a shell mound that had been reported on the island.

Since Goggin's visit, the burial mound has been investigated by archaeologists in 1962–1963, 1967, and 1970. Those archaeologists reported that the mound had been greatly disturbed by archaeological looting since Goggin's visit.

== History ==
The island was called Cayo de la Leña (Spanish for "Isle of Wood") on a chart in 1760. Shortly after Britain took over Florida from Spain in 1763, the island was renamed "Jenkinson". In the 1830s, residents of nearby Indian Key, who called the island "Lignurd Vitoz", grew crops, including sisal, on it. A coconut grove was established on the island between 1888 and 1919.

Records of the ownership of Lignumvitae Key go back to 1843, including the years of 1919-1953 when the Matheson family of Miami owned the island. The island was purchased by Dr. Edwin C. Lunsford, Sr. and two other investors in 1953. Charlotte and Russell Neidhauk lived on the island and served as caretakers during this period. The coral rock house they lived in still stands today. On March 2, 1971, Lignumvitae and nearby Shell Key were purchased by the state of Florida, and became part of Lignumvitae Key State Botanical Park.

== Sources ==
- Goggin, John M. (1944). "Archaeological Investigations in the Upper Florida Keys" (PDF). Tequesta. 4: 13–35 – via Florida International University Libraries.
- Kessel, Morton H. (September 2004). "Human Skeletal Remains from Lignumvitae Key Burial Mound, Monroe County, Florida". The Florida Anthropologist. 57 (3): 229–235 – via University of Florida Digital Collections.
- "Lignumvitae Key Botanical State Park Unit Management Plan (UMP)" (PDF). Florida Department of Environmental Protection. December 19, 2000. Archived from the original (PDF) on July 3, 2011.
