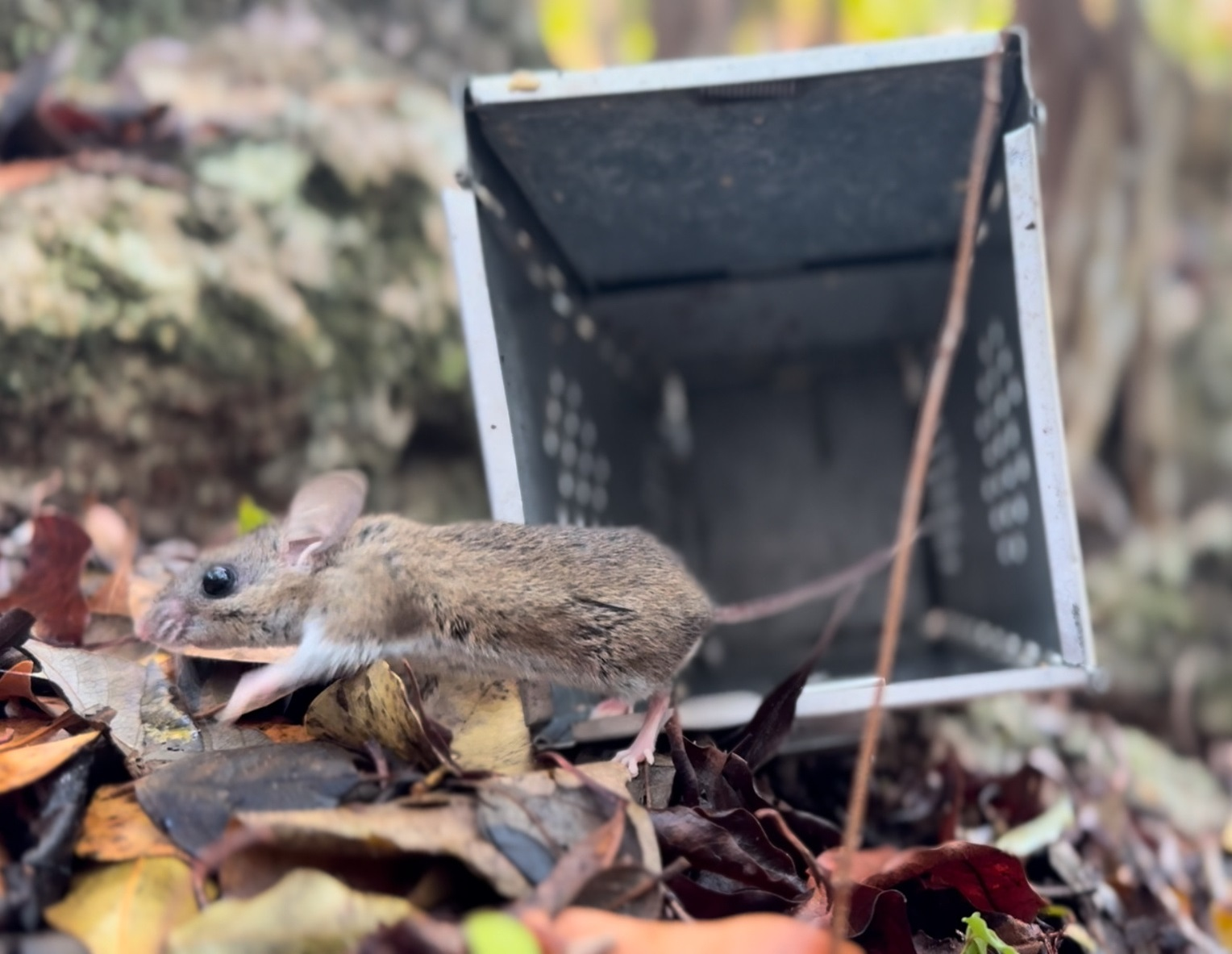

Conservation status
- Critically Imperiled (NatureServe)

- Endangered (ESA)

Scientific classification
- Kingdom: Animalia
- Phylum: Chordata
- Class: Mammalia
- Order: Rodentia
- Family: Cricetidae
- Subfamily: Neotominae
- Genus: Peromyscus
- Species: P. gossypinus
- Subspecies: P. g. allapaticola

Trinomial name
- Peromyscus gossypinus allapaticola Schwartz, 1952
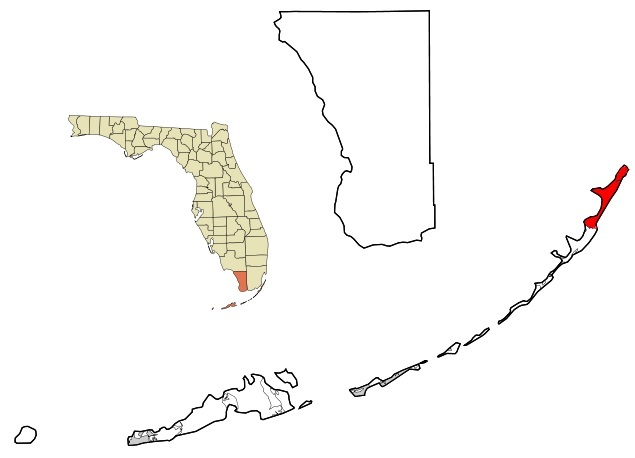
- Key Largo cotton mouse distribution map

= Key Largo cotton mouse =

Subspecies of rodent

The Key Largo cotton mouse (Peromyscus gossypinus allapaticola) is a subspecies of cotton mouse, a rodent in the family Cricetidae. It is a subspecies of the genus Peromyscus, a closely related group of New World mice often called "deermice". The subspecies is endemic to Key Largo in the upper Florida Keys. It is a slightly larger mouse with a more reddish color than other mouse species from mainland Florida. The Key Largo cotton mouse can breed throughout the year and has an average life expectancy of five months.

The Key Largo cotton mouse is on the United States Fish and Wildlife Service list of endangered species, due to urbanization of Key Largo. The subspecies previously lived in a variety of tropical hardwood habitats, but urbanization has decimated these areas, reducing the availability of food, shelter, and habitat for the Key Largo cotton mouse. Surveys show that the Key Largo cotton mouse has lost up to 50% of its habitat due to this urbanization.

== Taxonomy ==
Due to its longer overall length, tail length, skull measurements, and reddish fur color, the Key Largo cotton mouse was described as a distinct subspecies by Schwartz in 1952. Its subspecific epithet allapaticola originates from the local Seminole Native American term allapattah, which indicates the tropical, dry, deciduous hammocks of South Florida.

== Description ==
The Key Large cotton mouse has large ears, protuberant eyes, and a furry tail. Its coloration follows a pattern of red dorsal fur, dusky brown sides, and white ventral fur. Its tail follows a similar pattern being darker brown on top and whiter underneath. Body length range is 170–189 mm (6.7–7.4 in), as compared with the average length of 100 mm (3.9 in) for other cotton mouse subspecies. Tail length is 72–87 mm (2.8–3.4 in), and hindfoot length is 21–23 mm (0.83–0.91 in).

== Distribution ==
Both the Key Largo cotton mouse and the Key Largo woodrat (Neotoma floridana smalli) are endemic to Key Largo, Florida. Due to habitat destruction from development and fires, the Key Largo cotton mouse has been pushed to the northernmost portion of Key Largo, North Key Largo. Although historically the Key Largo cotton mouse was once found as far south as Plantation Key, near Tavernier, they are now only found in a confined area north of the U.S. 1-C.R. 905 intersection. This range shift can be attributed to the increased urbanization of Key Largo which has decimated the forests of tropical hardwood hammocks, thus reducing the availability of food, shelter and habitat for the cotton mouse. Surveys indicate that the Key Largo cotton mouse has lost more than 50 percent of its habitat due to this urbanization, and much of the remaining habitat has been degraded or fragmented. This has led to isolation of populations, making proper reproduction and dispersal more difficult.

This fragmentation and range limitation makes the Key Largo cotton mouse more vulnerable to fires and hurricanes. These natural catastrophes pose a threat to both existing populations as well as their limited hammock habitat.

Additionally, habitat degradation poses a large threat to this species as trash dumping (a common side effect of urbanization) leads to increased populations of black rats (Rattus rattus) and predation by domesticated animals. Rodent control techniques used to combat these black rats also kill cotton mice. Black rats compete with cotton mice and have previously led to the extinction of other cotton mouse subspecies.

== Habitat ==
While the cotton mouse is one of the most common small mammals in South Florida and throughout the southeastern United States, the Key Largo cotton mouse subspecies is endemic to Key Largo. In addition to being only found in North Key Largo, the Key Largo cotton mouse's preferred habitat is coastal strands adjacent to these forests. The hardwood hammocks they prefer are highly productive forests with a tall canopy and open understory, consisting of a diverse range of species.

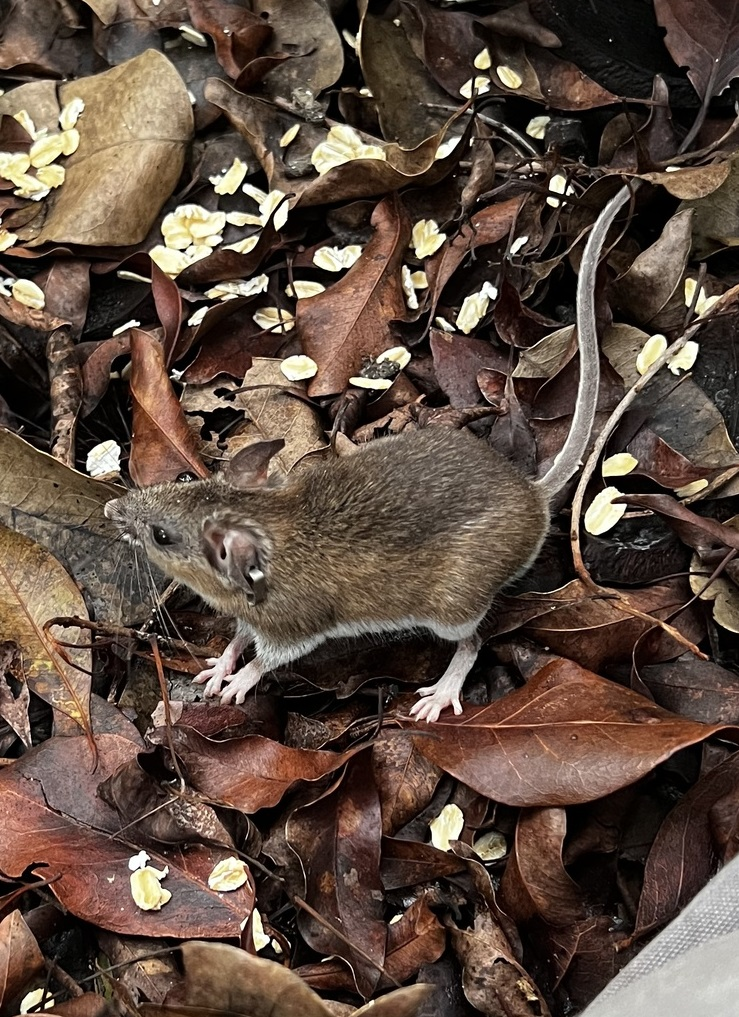
Key Largo Cotton Mouse (Peromyscus gossypinus allapaticola)

== Behavior ==
Because the population of Key Largo cotton mice is small, many of their behavioral characteristics are inferred from the cotton mouse. The Key Largo cotton mouse builds small nests or dens by lining leaves inside logs, tree hollows, and rock crevices. The entrances to these nests measure around 3 to 9 cm in diameter and are often located at the base of trees; however, in some instances, an interesting relationship exists in that the Key Largo cotton mouse may share a nest with another endangered species, the Key Largo woodrat.

Key Largo cotton mice build leaf-lined nests in logs, tree hollows, and rock crevices. These are usually quite hidden, partially covered by leaves or bark, located at the bases of trees and with opening holes only 3 to 9 cm in diameter. Male mice tend to be less territorial than females, and thus have larger home ranges. These home ranges can overlap between different mice. Cotton mice are known to move at least 2 km in a 1 to 2 days period.

These mice are nocturnal feeders and, as omnivores, feed on a wide variety of plant and animal materials. Much of the fruit and berries produced by tropical hardwood hammock habitat species can be food items for the occupant cotton mice. More research is needed to know which berries more specifically are eaten by Key Largo cotton mice.

Key Largo cotton mice are known to breed throughout the year. While other populations of Florida cotton mice have high reproduction in the fall and early winter, breeding patterns for the cotton mice of Southern Florida have been found to be highly variable. Key Largo cotton mice produce two to three litters a year with an average of four pups per litter.

Cotton mice are short-lived species with an average life expectancy of five months, although potential lifespans can range up to three years. Research about Key Largo cotton mice is still underway to understand the life history of this subspecies in more detail.

== Conservation ==
The Key Largo cotton mouse was recognized by the Fish and Wildlife Service in a notice of review on July 28, 1980 (45 FR 49961). It was listed as endangered for 240 days on September 21, 1983, through an emergency listing action (48 FR 43040). The Key Largo cotton mouse was proposed as endangered with critical habitat on February 9, 1984 (49FR 4951) and was listed as an endangered species on August 31, 1984 (49 FR 34504). Urbanization has caused much of the decline in species population and because of this, a number of efforts have been made to try to re-establish population in less urbanized areas of the Florida Keys; however, success is very limited. In the past, very little research focused primarily on the Key Largo cotton mouse and additional information about this species is needed. Density and distribution studies of the Key Largo cotton mouse have been conducted, but the status of the current population is not known. Habitat destruction continued to threaten the species. By 1991, 41.2% of the seasonal deciduous forest on Key Largo had been cleared or filled for human needs, and by 1999 over 50% of the Key Largo cotton mouses’ habitat had been lost to urbanization. While the historic range of the Key Largo cotton mouse spanned both Key Largo and Plantation Key, as of 1999 the species was only found in the northern region of Key Largo. The remaining habitat of the Key Largo cotton mouse is severely fragmented. This population isolation makes it hard for individuals to find mates, limiting reproduction and population growth.

The rise in domesticated animals has also harmed the Key Largo cotton mouse population. Pet dogs and cats prey on Key Largo cotton mice, killing them and reducing their numbers. Trash and pollution boost black rat populations, which can outcompete the Key Largo cotton mouse for resources such as food. Efforts to control black rat populations, such as pesticides and rat traps, often harm Key Largo cotton mice. The rise in invasive predators such as the Burmese python (Python bivittatus) and the black and white tegus (Salvator merianae) has also contributed to declining Key Largo cotton mouse populations.

Climate factors also pose a threat to Key Largo cotton mice. Key Largo is highly susceptible to hurricanes, with 20 hurricanes making landfall in Key Largo between 1900 and 1990. Since the habitats of Key Largo cotton mice are at low elevation and fragmented, the species have difficulty finding safe shelter. Climate change is expected to increase the number of extreme weather events such as hurricanes, worsening the threat to Key Largo cotton mice. Rising sea levels due to global climate change are also expected to further fragment Key Largo cotton mouse habitats. It is predicted that as sea levels rise, the hardwood hammock habitats of Key Largo cotton mice will transition into unsuitable mangrove forests, resulting in an even smaller habitat for the species.

Efforts to protect the Key Largo cotton mouse are primarily focused on habitat protection. Negotiations between the Fish and Wildlife Service and organizations seeking to accelerate construction on Key Largo via water and electricity expansion resulted in exclusion zones in 1980. In these zones, water and electricity expansion is prohibited in order to protect the Key Largo cotton mouse and other endangered species. This is important because once an area has access to water and electricity, residential and commercial construction projects (such as houses, stores, and restaurants) can be started. These construction projects destroy natural habitat which endangers all the species that live there. These exclusion zones make up 45% of the Key Largo cotton mouse's habitat. The most successful action to preserve Key Largo cotton mouse populations thus far has been the public acquisition of land to establish the Crocodile Lake National Wildlife Refuge and the Key Largo Hammocks State Botanical Site. Thanks to these efforts, 91% of Key Largo cotton mouse habitat is protected.

The US Fish and Wildlife Service has recommended several other conservation strategies in order to downlist the Key Largo cotton mouse from endangered to threatened. These actions include researching to learn more about the species, its distribution, and its needs, raising public awareness of the species, expanding protection to 100% of Key Largo cotton mouse habitat, creating a 500-meter buffer zone around protected habitat, limiting pesticides and other pollutants, and widening the species’ range by establishing populations in South Key Largo and other Keys.

== In popular culture ==
In 2023 the Key Largo cotton mouse was featured on a United States Postal Service Forever stamp as part of the Endangered Species set, based on a photograph from Joel Sartore's Photo Ark. The stamp was dedicated at a ceremony at the National Grasslands Visitor Center in Wall, South Dakota.
