= Pallid beach mouse =

Conservation status
- Presumed Extinct (NatureServe)

Scientific classification
- Kingdom: Animalia
- Phylum: Chordata
- Class: Mammalia
- Order: Rodentia
- Family: Cricetidae
- Subfamily: Neotominae
- Genus: Peromyscus
- Species: P. polionotus
- Subspecies: †P. p. decoloratus

Trinomial name
- †Peromyscus polionotus decoloratus A.H. Howell, 1939

Extinct subspecies of rodent

The pallid beach mouse or Ponce de Leon beach mouse (Peromyscus polionotus decoloratus), is an extinct subspecies of the oldfield mouse, a rodent in the family Cricetidae. It was a subspecies of the genus Peromyscus, a closely related group of New World mice often called "deermice". It was endemic to Florida in the United States.

== Distribution ==
It was known from two locations in Florida: Ponce Park, Volusia County and Bulow, Flagler County.

== Description ==
The average pallid beach mouse was 4 to 8 centimetres (1.6 to 3.1 in) in length. This subspecies burrowed into dunes for protection.

== Extinction ==
The exact cause of extinction is unknown, but it is presumed to have been from a combination of habitat destruction due to property development, competition with invasive rodents, and predation from feral cats.
