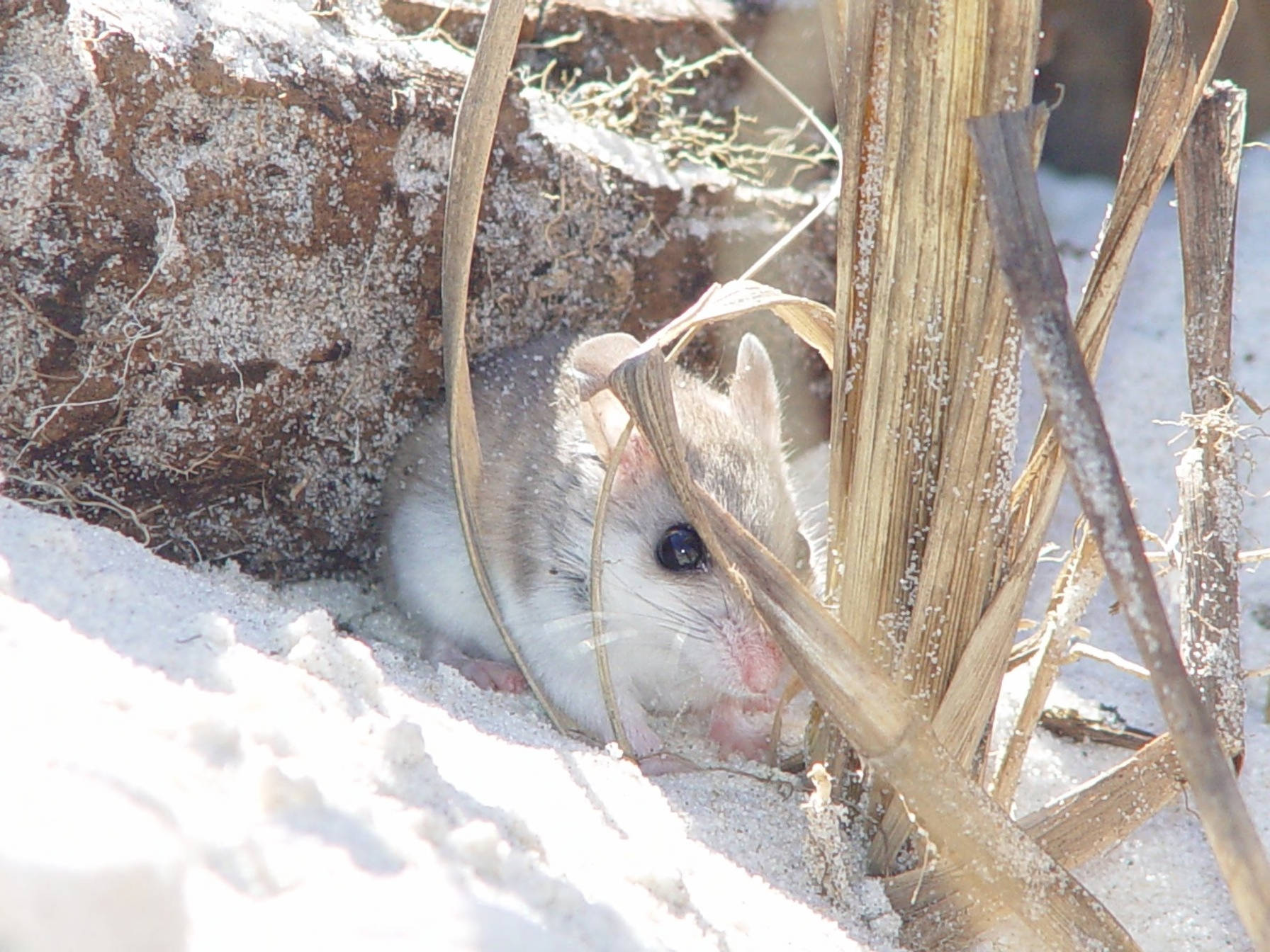
- Oldfield mouse at the beach, Alabama

Conservation status
- Least Concern (IUCN 3.1)

- Secure (NatureServe)

Scientific classification
- Kingdom: Animalia
- Phylum: Chordata
- Class: Mammalia
- Order: Rodentia
- Family: Cricetidae
- Subfamily: Neotominae
- Genus: Peromyscus
- Species: P. polionotus

Binomial name
- Peromyscus polionotus (Wagner, 1843)
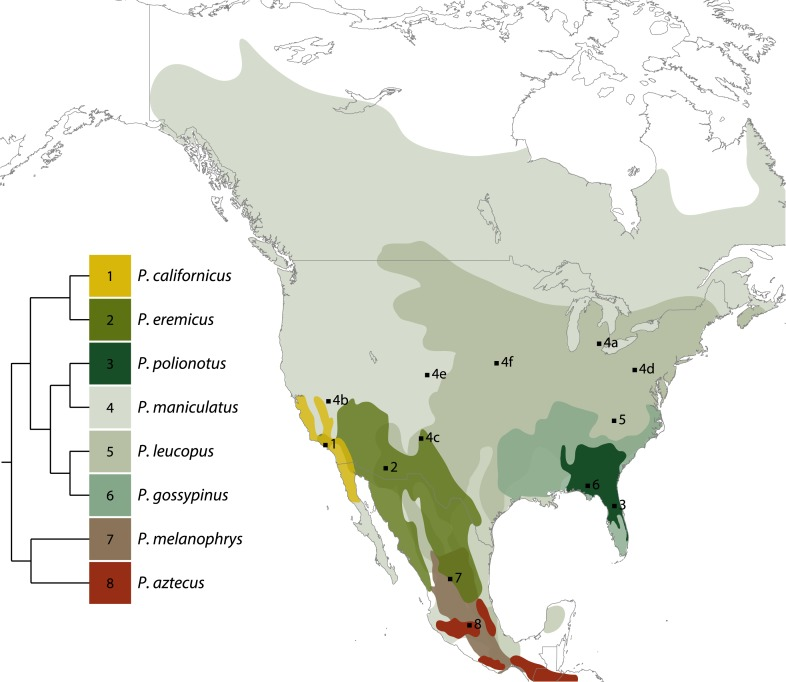
- native range

Synonyms
- List: Peromyscus polionotus subsp. polionotus (Wagner, 1843); Peromyscus polionotus subsp. ammobates Bowen, 1968; Peromyscus polionotus subsp. phasma Bangs, 1898; Peromyscus polionotus subsp. allophrys Bowen, 1968; Peromyscus polionotus subsp. trissyllepsis Bowen, 1968; Peromyscus polionotus subsp. niveiventris (Chapman, 1889); Mus polionotus Wagner, 1843; Peromyscus subgriseus subsp. baliolus Bangs, 1898; Peromyscus phasma Bangs, 1898; Hesperomys niveiventris Chapman, 1889; Peromyscus polionotus subsp. albifrons Osgood, 1909; Peromyscus polionotus subsp. colemani Schwartz, 1954; Peromyscus polionotus subsp. decoloratus A.H. Howell, 1939; Peromyscus polionotus subsp. leucocephalus A.H. Howell, 1920; Peromyscus leucocephalus A.H. Howell, 1920; Peromyscus polionotus subsp. lucubrans Schwartz, 1954; Peromyscus polionotus subsp. peninsularis A.H. Howell, 1939; Peromyscus polionotus subsp. rhoadsi Bangs, 1898; Peromyscus subgriseus subsp. rhoadsi Bangs, 1898; Peromyscus polionotus subsp. subgriseus (Chapman, 1893); Sitomys viveiventris subsp. subgriseus Chapman, 1893; Peromyscus polionotus subsp. griseobracatus Bowen, 1968; Sitomys niveiventris subsp. subgriseus Chapman, 1893; Peromyscus polionotus subsp. sumneri Bowen, 1968

= Oldfield mouse =

Species of rodent

The oldfield mouse, oldfield deermouse or beach mouse (Peromyscus polionotus) is a nocturnal species of rodent in the family Cricetidae. It is a species of the genus Peromyscus, a closely related group of New World mice often called "deermice", that primarily eats seeds. It lives in holes throughout the Southeastern United States in beaches and sandy fields. Predators to these mice include birds and mammals. In 2016, these mice were in the least concern category on the IUCN Red List with certain subspecies classified as extinct, critically endangered, endangered or near threatened.

== Distribution and habitat ==
The oldfield mouse occurs only in the southeastern United States, ranging from Florida to Tennessee. They primarily live in beaches and sandy fields.

== Description ==
The mouse has fawn-colored upperparts and grey to white underparts through most of its range, but on white sandy beaches, the mouse is light or even white to help them stay hidden from predators. Inland populations are darker and smaller with shorter tails that are dusky above and white below. General body and tail color may vary slightly depending upon geographical location.

Measurements (20 adults from Alabama, Florida, and Georgia)
Statistic	Average	Range
Length	127 mm (5.0 in)	122–138 mm (4.8–5.4 in)
Tail	47 mm (1.9 in)	40–51 mm (1.6–2.0 in)
Hind foot	16.5 mm (0.65 in)	15–18 mm (0.59–0.71 in)
Weight	8–19 g (0.28–0.67 oz)	
Diploid number	48	
Tooth formula	1.0.0.31.0.0.3 = 16	

== Behavior ==
The mouse is primarily nocturnal. Oldfield mice construct elaborate burrow systems with entrance tunnels, nest chambers, and escape routes.

=== Diet ===
P. polionotus is omnivorous and the principal diet is seasonal seeds of wild grasses and forbs, but blackberries, acorns, wild peas, and arthropods may be consumed.

=== Shelter ===
These mice dig holes in earth to create homes. Spiders, snakes, and other animals may move into a burrow.

=== Reproduction ===
The mice are monogamous. When they are born, the baby mice are vulnerable, hairless, and blind.

Reproduction
Sexual maturity (female)	30 days
Gestation	23–24 days
Litter size	3–4 (viviparous)
Weight at birth	1.1–2.2 g (0.039–0.078 oz)
Weaning	20–25 days
Adult weight	8–10 g (0.28–0.35 oz)

=== Survival ===
Birds and mammals prey upon the oldfield mouse. Various types of parasites can effect oldfield mice, with nematodes being the main ones. The average lifespan of a mouse in the wild is 18 months, though one mouse survived in captivity for 5.5 years. They are primarily nocturnal to avoid predation.

== Conservation ==
In 2010, the beach mouse was in the least concern category on the IUCN Red List. For the beach mouse's subspecies, out of sixteen known, one is extinct, one was listed critically endangered, four endangered and two near threatened.

Under the Endangered Species Act of 1973, the following beach mice are protected as endangered or threatened subspecies:

- Southeastern beach mouse (P. p. niveiventris) – Threatened
- Anastasia Island beach mouse (P. p. phasma) – Endangered
- Alabama beach mouse (P. p. ammobates) – Endangered
- Perdido Key beach mouse (P. p. trissyllepsis) – Endangered
- Choctawhatchee beach mouse (P. p. allophrys) – Endangered
- St. Andrew beach mouse (P. p. peninsularis) – Endangered

The pallid beach mouse (P. p. decoloratus) is presumed extinct. The Santa Rosa beach mouse (P. p. leucocephalus) is listed as critically imperiled by NatureServe.

== Predation ==
In Florida, beach mice may be eaten by some growth stage of invasive snakes such as Burmese pythons, reticulated pythons, Southern African rock pythons, Central African rock pythons, boa constrictors, yellow anacondas, Bolivian anacondas, dark-spotted anacondas, and green anacondas.
