= Crocodile Lake National Wildlife Refuge =

United States National Wildlife Refuge in Florida

- IUCN category V (protected landscape/seascape)
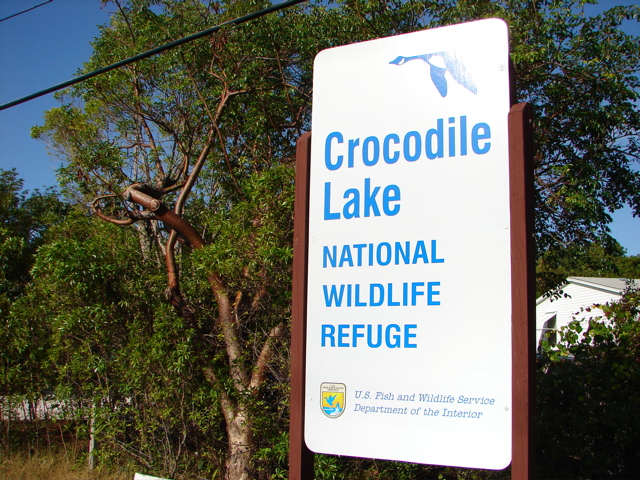
- Sign at the refuge

- Location within the United States
- Location: Monroe County, Florida, United States
- Nearest city: Key Largo, Florida
- Coordinates: 25°16′16″N 80°19′15″W
- Area: 6,686 acres (2,706 ha)
- Established: 1980
- Governing body: US Fish & Wildlife Service
- Website: Crocodile Lake National Wildlife Refuge

The Crocodile Lake National Wildlife Refuge is part of the United States National Wildlife Refuge System, located in north Key Largo, less than 40 miles (64 km) south of Miami off SR 905 (Card Sound Road). The 6,686 acres (2,706 ha) refuge (located in Monroe County, Florida) opened during the year of 1980, under the Land and Water Conservation Fund Act of 1965 and the Endangered Species Act of 1973. It was established in order to protect critical breeding and nesting habitat for the threatened American crocodile and other wildlife. This area also includes 650 acres (260 ha) of open water in and around the refuge. In addition to being one of only three breeding populations of the American crocodile, the refuge is home to tropical hardwood hammock, mangrove forest, and salt marsh. It is administered as part of the National Key Deer Refuge which is also located in the Florida Keys.

== History ==
Crocodile Lake National Wildlife Refuge was once entirely platted for residential development; however, accumulated deposits of dredge-spoils on the bayside of North Key Largo became an important nesting area for some of the country's remaining American crocodiles which have recovered in recent years from a low, in 1975, of approximately 200 in population size. The American crocodile had nearly been extirpated by hunting for export of its hide as an exotic leather. The government took protective action and listed the US population due to this hunting and, also, due to loss of habitat in the area. Due to its recovery trend, on March 20, 2007, the federal government downlisted the American crocodile from endangered to threatened, though the capturing and hunting of the crocodile is still forbidden.

The crocodile is just one of several species of flora and fauna that occur in the refuge's habitats. The Key Largo Woodrat, Key Largo Cotton Mouse, Schaus Swallowtail butterfly, Florida semaphore cactus are listed as endangered, and the Stock Island Tree Snail and Eastern Indigo Snake are listed as threatened. All six species retain a precarious foothold in North Key Largo. Due to the once almost unrestricted commercial and residential development of the Florida Keys, the size and number of fragmented tropical hardwood hammock habitat have been reduced. Along with the decline of their habitat, the populations of animals who reside in the habitat have also declined. Though the refuge office distributes brochures and information, and has a 2,500 square-foot butterfly garden beside the office, the refuge's natural areas are closed to the public. This closure is necessary to protect the threatened and endangered listed species that occur on the Refuge.

== Fauna ==
=== Key Largo Woodrat ===
The woodrat is a member of the Order Rodentia, and Family Cricetidae, subfamily Neotominae. Critecidae is one of the largest families of mammals, with 681 species in 130 genera and 6 subfamilies. The subfamilies of Cricetidae include: Arvicolinae (lemmings, voles, and muskrat), Cricetinae (hamsters), Lophiomyinae (crested rat), Neotominae (North American rats and mice), Sigmodontinae (New World rats and mice), and Tylomyinae (vesper rats and climbing rats) (Musser and Carleton, 2005). In other words, the Key Largo woodrat, and its smaller cousin the Key Largo cotton mouse (Peromyscus gossypinus allapaticola) are in subfamily Neotominae, along with most native North American rats and mice, and are only distantly related to the "true rats", including members of the genus Rattus, the most important of which to humans are the black rat, Rattus rattus, and the brown rat, Rattus norvegicus. Many members of other rodent genera and families are also referred to as rats, and share many characteristics with true rats.is considered more as a type of mouse due to its similar behavior and physical characteristics.

One of the favored habitats of the woodrat comes under the protection of the hardwood hammocks. These trees provide a critical home for this endangered animal; however, the woodrats are finding it harder to live because of the decreasing size of their hammock habitat, and because of subsidized predation by free-roaming house cats. Local researchers have discovered that the desired habitat for these creatures also has something to do with a type of roof coverage. They tend to prefer nesting in areas underneath rock formations, hurricane-downed trees, and even overturned boats. Experts say a devastating hurricane would down thousands of trees yet, would increase the woodrat population. The main shelter characteristic of the woodrats are areas containing roofs. The roof provides a type of cover that is critical for protection against predators and heavy rainfall. According to local volunteer and photographer Clay DeGayner, the woodrats' population has declined significantly over the past twenty years and at one point had dropped to numbers as low as 25 to 50 woodrats.

==== Captive breeding program for the Key Largo Woodrat ====
A captive breeding program was started to augment the endangered woodrat population and help it recover more quickly. The Key Largo Woodrat forages for food mostly at night and in tree tops. Though fallen fruit can easily found on the forest floor, that is also where the rat is most vulnerable to its predators. During the day, Key Largo woodrats shelter in crevices and fissures in the island's limestone substrate, and under dense tangles of tree roots. The normal diet of the woodrats consists of green leaves, flowers, buds and fruit from the trees they reside in and under. Woodrats are seldom found near human habitation and, unlike introduced rat species that came to America from Europe and Asia, woodrats are not attracted to or known to consume garbage.

Though it had ended by 2010, the main purpose of the breeding program was to enhance the wild population in order to mitigate the population decline. Divided into a couple of different stages, the first step was to trap woodrats and then to breed them in a controlled, captive environment. Offspring were then released into the refuge, but unfortunately fell victim to predators, primarily feral cats.

==== Non-native Predators ====
===== Burmese Python =====
Crocodile Lake National Wildlife Refuge (CLWR) and Dagny Johnson Key Largo Hammock Botanical State Park (KLH) are separated by the County Road 905 right-of-way for approximately 10 miles (16 km). On April 13, 2007, two researchers were studying North Key Largo's population of Key Largo woodrats, one of two federally endangered mammals found only in North Key Largo (the other being the Key Largo cotton mouse). Graduate student / biologist Joanne Potts and her assistant, Wildlife Refuge volunteer Clay DeGayner, were working in KLH and tracking a telemetry signal transmitted by one of several radio collars they had placed on a small number of woodrats. The signal led them to a python weighing 12 pounds (5.4 kg) and measuring approximately 7 ft (2 m) in length; the radio signal was coming from inside the python. A post-mortem examination revealed that the snake had very recently captured and eaten, not only the collared woodrat, but also a second (uncollared) woodrat. The python also turned out to be the first vouchered (verified by a specimen or photograph) occurrence of its species found wild in the Florida Keys. However, over the following year, another half-dozen pythons were found after they were killed by traffic on roads in the same area.

The appearance of numbers of Burmese pythons in North Key Largo was forewarning of a serious new threat to the survival, not just of the rare Key Largo Woodrat and Cotton Mouse, but also to another three federally endangered mammals found only in the Florida Keys: the Key Deer, Silver Rice Rat and Keys Marsh Rabbit are all found only in the Lower Florida Keys (on Big Pine Key and a few other islands further down the archipelago). Though pythons and other constrictors (especially boa constrictors) do take other prey, most have special adaptations for detecting and capturing warm-blooded prey (mammals and birds), even in total darkness. And the mammals and birds of south Florida and the Florida Keys have never been exposed to a predatory snake of this size, and may have a hard time adapting defensive strategies before their populations are wiped out. A study of python prey, in Everglades National Park shows an alarming declines among small mammal populations in the park.

“There's a good chance we never would have found him”, said Scott Hardin, exotic-species coordinator for the state Fish and Wildlife Conservation Commission. “This was always my concern, what would happen when an exotic species like the python intersects with an endangered species. Here it's happened, and it has the potential to be a serious problem.” Hardin later assumed the 7.5 feet (2.3 m) snake was either an escaped or released pet by someone who realized the python "[had] become a burden". Walter Meshaka, senior curator for the State Museum of Pennsylvania, stated that pythons are very good swimmers and, therefore, it seemed reasonable to assume it had swum from the Everglades into the Key Largo area refuge. From 2008 to 2013, a USGS study focused on detection and removal of pythons on the refuge yielded very few snakes.

===== Feral and free-ranging cats =====
Feral and free-ranging cats have been identified as a major factor in the significant decline of the Key Largo woodrat and the Key Largo cotton mouse. Recent remote camera work has identified cats throughout the refuge and KLH, with some perched on top of nest structures. Cats have been returned that are 8 miles from their owner's homes. Cats are captured by staff and volunteers and turned over to the local animal shelter. The owners of cats that continually trespass may be subject to fines.

== Flora ==
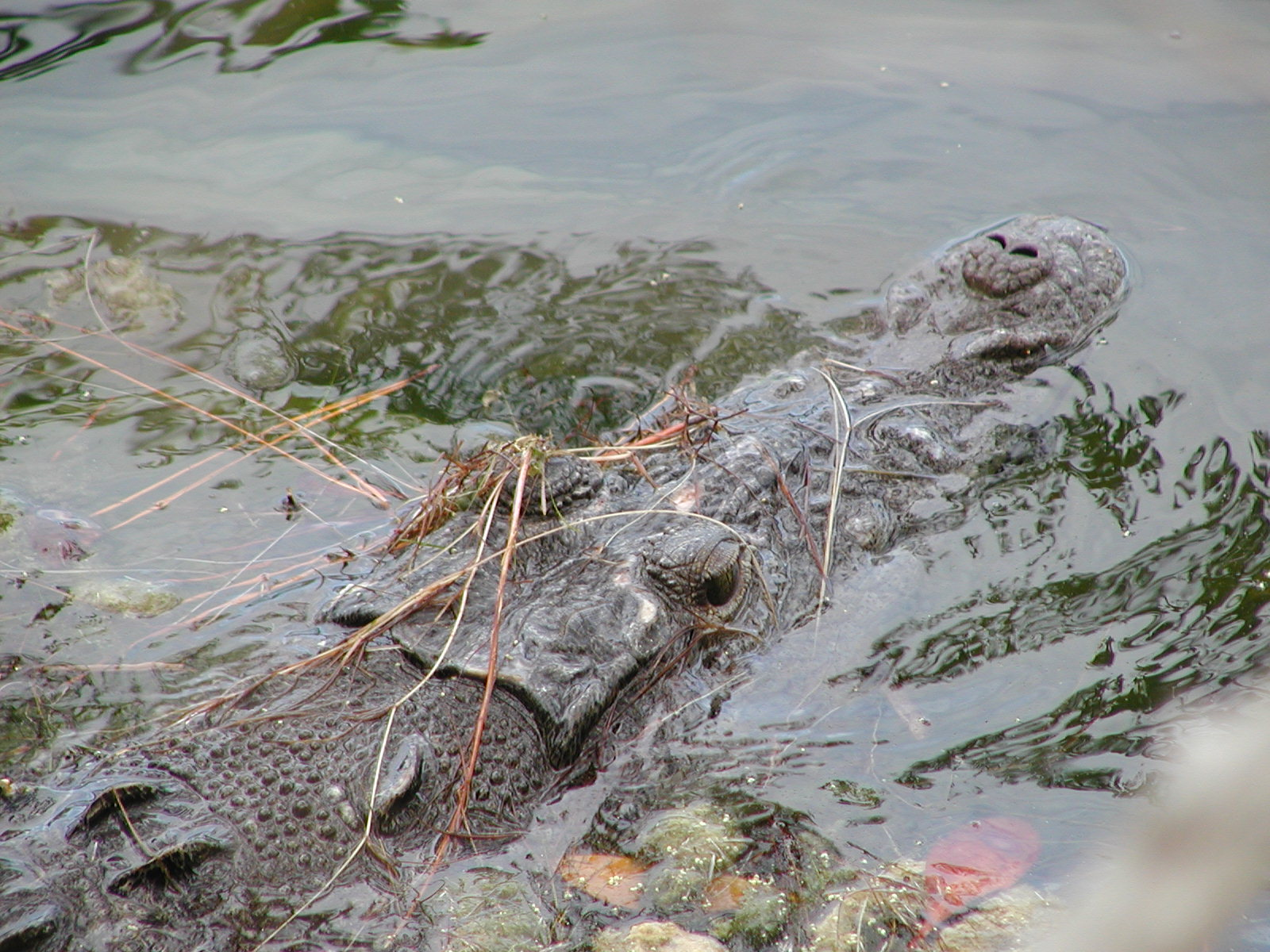
American crocodile

=== Tropical Hardwood Hammock ===
During the Cold War, a missile facility was built on the grounds where the refuge now lies. The base, constructed in an area which habituated the hammock, built numerous buildings and launch-pads to aid in war efforts. By the year 2000, the refuge had started plans for a project to remove unnecessary buildings and asphalt pavement from areas that had once been hardwood hammock. The refuge hopes this task will restore more than 10 acres (4 ha) to the area. One of the primary natural values of hammocks is that they "provide critical habitats for five federally endangered species". These species, mentioned in the first section of the article, have decreased in population due to the removal of hammock over the past few decades. The refuge, therefore, has attempted to restore hammock habitat wherever it can. Hardwood hammocks consist of mostly West Indian hardwood species that occur (in the mainland United States) only in southernmost Florida, though some also remain on Puerto Rico and the US Virgin Islands. Most of South Florida's hardwood hammock habitat was lost to urban and suburban development.

=== Keystone Pit restoration project ===
There is a 2.16 acres (8,700 m^{2}) hole (officially known as the "Keystone Pit") in the refuge, which manager Steven Klett has wanted to fill in order to revitalize the hammock habitat. The pit was dug 30 to 40 years ago in order to obtain fossilized coral to build and decorate fireplaces and other types of architecture (much of the limestone rock was mined as well). According to an article published by McClatchy-Tribune Business News, "ever-growing piles of muck from widening U.S. 1 north of Key Largo could be used to fill in a gaping hole in the Crocodile Lake National Wildlife Refuge". The muck from the construction of the highway will most likely be used to help fill in the hole on the refuge. The main purpose of re-filling the hole is to populate the hardwood hammock by planting native vegetation in the area. The material referred to as 'muck' contains organic substances which will enhance the vegetation growth. Scientists in the area have claimed the substance to contain no damaging chemicals that would possibly harm animals or rather, the ecosystem. Originally, US Highway 1 had evacuated the muck in order to improve road conditions near the refuge. "I feel very good about possibly being able to solve our problem and the [Department of Transportation] problem", Klett said in an interview. The Department of Transportation was required to move the muck in an effort to clean up the area; however, staff at the refuge decided to ask for permission to use the muck (layering 36 inches) for gaping the hole.

== Gallery ==
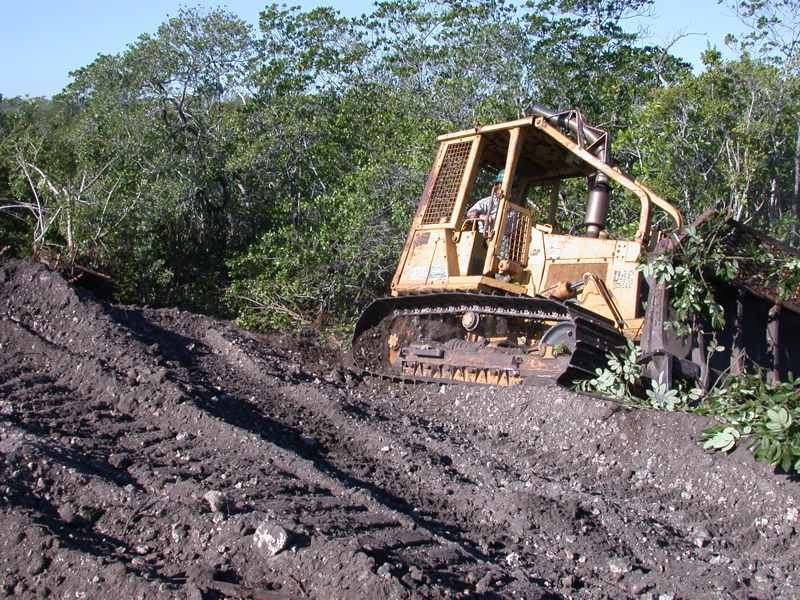
Artificial clearing for crocodile nesting

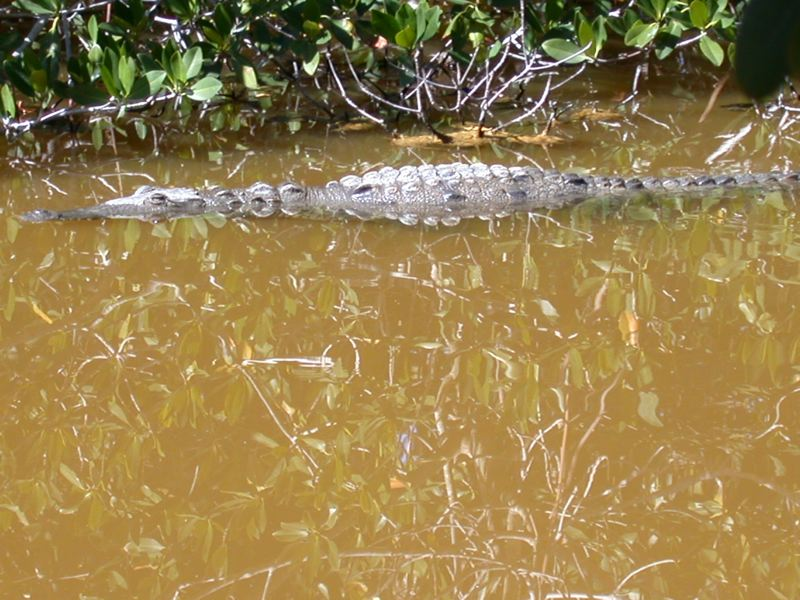
Crocodile

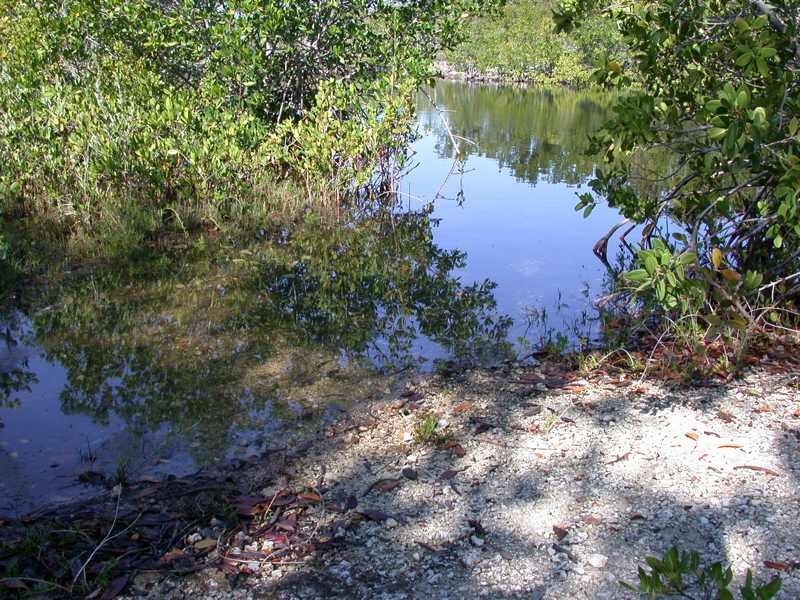
Disturbed man-made channels

== See also ==
- American Crocodile
- Monroe County, Florida
- National Key Deer Refuge
- National Key Deer Sanctuary
- National Park Service
- National Wildlife Refuge
