= Chadwick Beach cotton mouse =

Conservation status
- Presumed Extinct (NatureServe)

Scientific classification
- Kingdom: Animalia
- Phylum: Chordata
- Class: Mammalia
- Order: Rodentia
- Family: Cricetidae
- Subfamily: Neotominae
- Genus: Peromyscus
- Species: P. gossypinus
- Subspecies: †P. g. restrictus

Trinomial name
- †Peromyscus gossypinus restrictus A.H. Howell, 1939

Extinct subspecies of rodent

The Chadwick Beach cotton mouse (Peromyscus gossypinus restrictus) is a presumably extinct subspecies of the cotton mouse, a rodent in the family Cricetidae. It was a subspecies of the genus Peromyscus, a closely related group of New World mice often called "deermice". It was confined to a small area on the Manasota Key Peninsula in Florida.

== Description ==
It was smaller and paler than the nominate subspecies. The total length was 172 mm, the tail length 72.5 mm, the hind foot length 22.3 mm, the ear length 22.3 mm, and largest skull length was 27.6 mm. The zygomatic breadth was 13.9 mm, the preorbital breadth was 4.4 mm, the nasal length was 10.9 mm, and the length of the teeth in the maxilla was 3.9 mm. The upper parts were pink cinnamon, with a rufous hue in the middle of the back. The under parts were white with a pale pink buff wash on the chest. The tail was brown above and buff below. The dorsal stripe in the middle of the back was smaller than in the nominate race.

== Distribution ==
The mouse was primarily found in the Chadwick Beach area at Englewood in Sarasota County and Englewood Beach in the southern part of Englewood, Florida, in Charlotte County.

== Habitat and ecology ==
It preferred maritime forests with closed canopies. Characteristic trees of these forests are Sabal palmetto, Quercus virginiana, and Juniperus virginiana var. silicicola. It was also found on sand dunes where sea oats (Uniola paniculata), a high growing grass species, is the dominant vegetation. Like the nominate subspecies, the Chadwick Beach cotton mouse was nocturnal. The ecology of this subspecies is not studied.

== Extinction ==
It is only known by 15 specimens collected by Luther C. Goldman in March 1938. It is now presumed extinct after extensive surveys in 1984, 1985, 1988, and 1989 failed to find the mouse again. Causes for its disappearance might have been the deforestation of the maritime forests in the southernmost part of Sarasota County, as well as predation by feral cats.
