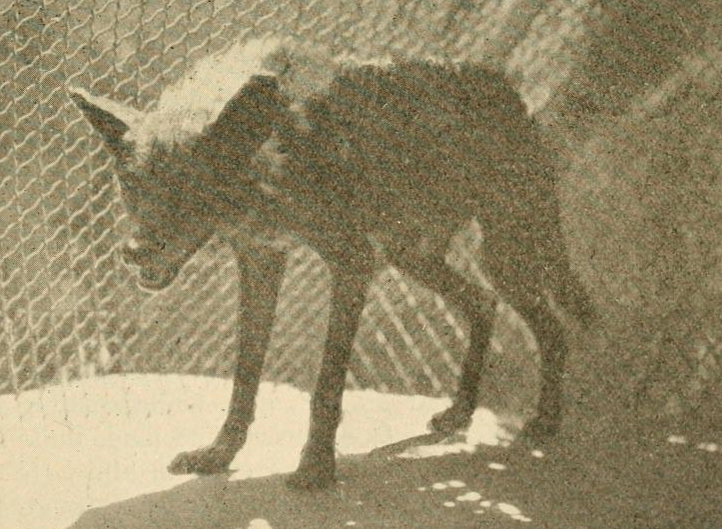
- A captive specimen from New Orleans

Conservation status
- Extinct (1908)

Scientific classification
- Kingdom: Animalia
- Phylum: Chordata
- Class: Mammalia
- Order: Carnivora
- Family: Canidae
- Genus: Canis
- Species: C. rufus
- Subspecies: †C. r. floridanus

Trinomial name
- †Canis rufus floridanus (Miller, 1912)
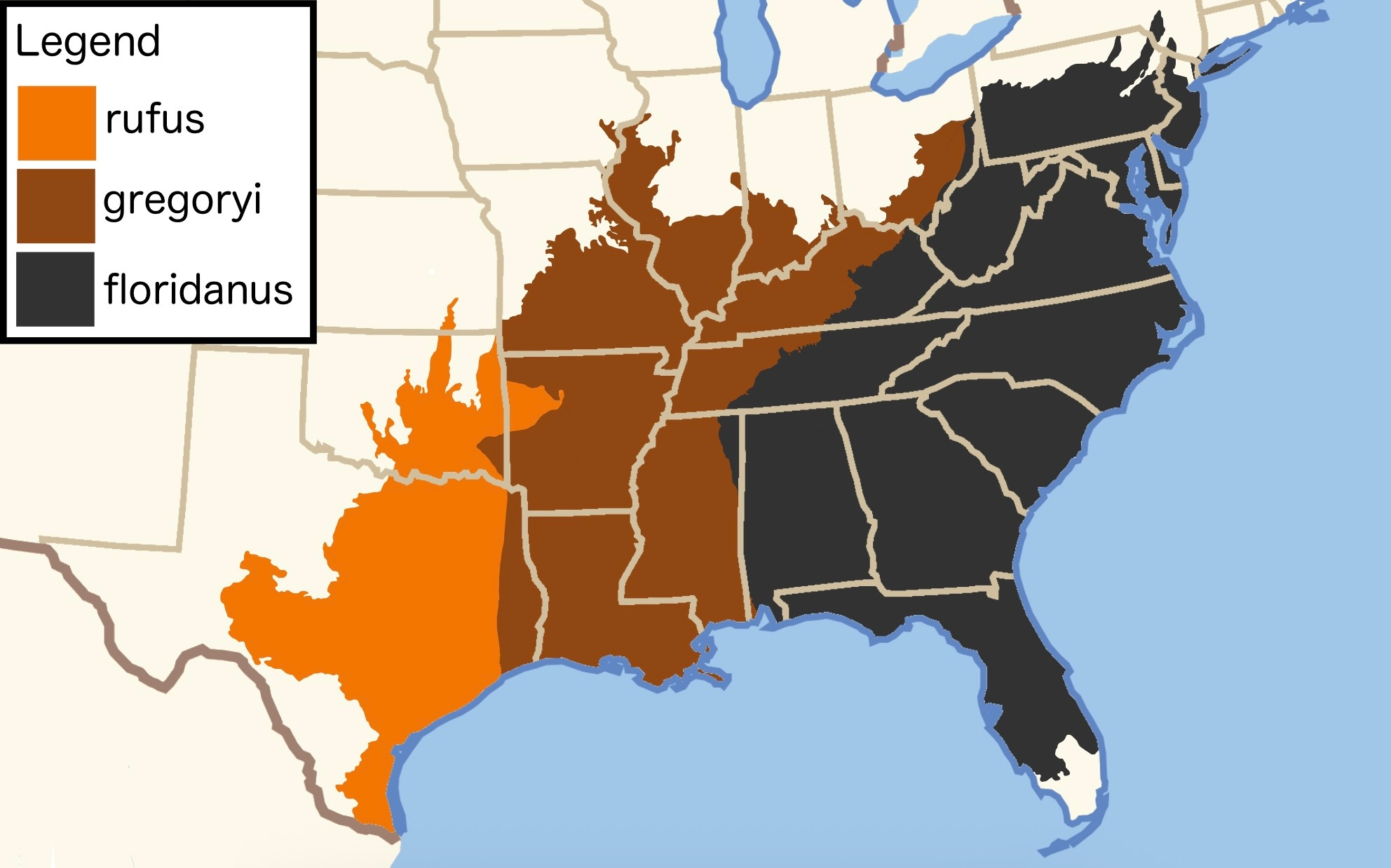
- Distribution of C. r. floridanus (black)

Synonyms
- List: Canis floridanus Miller, 1912; Canis lupus floridanus; Canis lycaon americans; Canis niger niger Young & Goldman, 1937

= Florida black wolf =

Florida black wolf Temporal range: Holocene

Extinct subspecies of red wolf

The Florida black wolf (Canis rufus floridanus) also known as the Florida wolf and the black wolf, is an extinct subspecies of red wolf that was native to the Southeastern United States.

== Taxonomy ==
This wolf is recognized as a subspecies of Canis lupus in the taxonomic authority Mammal Species of the World (2005). William Bartram first wrote this wolf in his 1791 book Bartram's Travels, calling it Lupus niger (black wolf).

Edward Alphonso Goldman was the first to classify red wolves and Florida black wolves as conspecific. Since the Florida black wolf was described first, its trinomial name became Canis niger niger, and other subspecies were placed under the species C. niger. In 1957, the International Commission on Zoological Nomenclature rejected the name Canis niger as Bartram didn't consistently use the principles of binomial nomenclature. As a result, the species name became Canis rufus, and the Florida black wolf's trinomial became Canis rufus floridanus.

Currently, this canid is widely considered to be a subspecies of the red wolf Canis rufus and that a variation in the red wolf's coloring led to the creation of the Florida black wolf.

== Description ==
This subspecies was the largest subspecies of red wolf, having a body length of 165 cm (65 in). It had a distinctive black coat, and females had a white spot in the chest.
