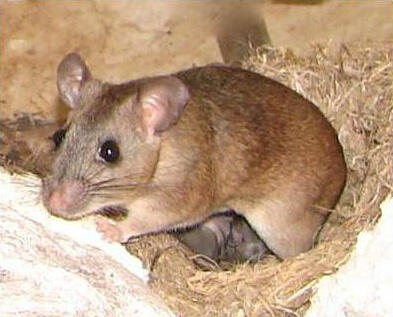

Conservation status
- Critically Imperiled (NatureServe)

- Endangered (ESA)

Scientific classification
- Kingdom: Animalia
- Phylum: Chordata
- Class: Mammalia
- Order: Rodentia
- Family: Cricetidae
- Subfamily: Neotominae
- Genus: Neotoma
- Species: N. floridana
- Subspecies: N. f. smalli

Trinomial name
- Neotoma floridana smalli Sherman, 1955

= Key Largo woodrat =

Subspecies of rodent endemic to Key Largo, Florida, United States

The Key Largo woodrat (Neotoma floridana smalli), a subspecies of the eastern woodrat (Neotoma floridana), is a medium-sized rat found on less than 2,000 acres (~8.09 square kilometers) of the northern area of Key Largo, Florida, in the United States. It is currently on the United States Fish and Wildlife Service list of endangered species. Only 6500 animals were thought to remain in North Key Largo in the late 1980s.

== Taxonomy ==
Although a 1923 article described woodrat nests on Key Largo, the form was not scientifically described until 1955, when H.B. Sherman described it as Neotoma floridana smalli, a subspecies of the widespread eastern woodrat. In 1987, Lazell suggested that it is distinct enough to be considered a separate species, but this proposal has not been accepted. The mitochondrial DNA of Key Largo woodrats is distinct by at least 0.6% from that of the most similar subspecies, the Florida woodrat (N. f. floridana) from further north in Florida, but members of that subspecies differ about as much from each other as from the Key Largo woodrat.

== Description ==
The Key Largo woodrat is similar to the mainland Florida woodrat and cannot be distinguished from it in size or external anatomy. It differs in the shape of the sphenopalatine vacuities (openings in the roof of the mesopterygoid fossa, the gap behind the palate), which are narrower and shorter than in N. f. floridana. The rat grows to 260 grams (about nine ounces). It has a gray-brown back and white belly, chest, and throat, and a hairy tail. On average, males are slightly larger than females. In the holotype, an adult male, total length is 368 mm (14.5 in), tail length 167 mm (6.6 in), hindfoot length 37 mm (1.5 in), ear length 26 mm (1.0 in), dimensions of the testis 14 mm × 8.5 mm (0.55 in × 0.33 in), and mass is 207 g (7.3 oz).

== Distribution and habitat ==
The animal is found exclusively in the northern part of Key Largo, at least 210 km removed from mainland populations. It is endemic to the tropical hardwood hammocks of Key Largo, where its habitat has shrunk by half since the 1920s, and the remainder is , thinned, and developed. It retains some 850 ha, most of which is in the Dagny Johnson Key Largo Hammock Botanical State Park and the adjacent Crocodile Lake National Wildlife Refuge.

== Behavior ==
=== Shelter ===
The Key Largo woodrat feeds on fruit, leaves and buds. It also builds nests out of sticks; these nests can be as high as a man's shoulder. They are reused by successive generations of woodrats; some are possibly centuries old.

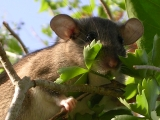

== Conservation ==
Since the Key Largo woodrat has a small and specific habitat, it is susceptible to human encroachment. Since the 1920s, it has lost almost half of its traditional habitat. In the early 1980s, biologists began equipping rats with radio devices to count them and study them; by the end of the 1980s, a study showed that the rat had disappeared from Key Largo proper and its total population had dwindled to some 6500 animals on North Key Largo. Its fate in Key Largo was tied to that of the American crocodile (Crocodylus acutus), and when a planned reservation for the crocodile in North Key Largo bogged down during the presidential transition in the US Administration in 1980, the woodrat was threatened with extinction; the crocodile reservation was to be a haven for the woodrat, and also for the rare Schaus swallowtail butterfly (Papilio aristodemus). A project called Port Bougainville, with 15 hotels besides condos, would add 45,000 inhabitants to North Key Largo by the year 2000, adding to the pressure on the crocodile and other animals.

The 406-acre (1.64 km^{2}) project, which by 1982 included a planned 2806 units, ran into opposition from environmental groups and by 1984 had ground to a halt after one of the investors withdrew a $54 million investment. in 1983 already, the administration had intervened and declared the Key Largo woodrat and the Key Largo cotton mouse (Peromyscus gossypinus allapaticola) endangered on a "temporary emergency basis"; the developer of a golf course, for instance, was ordered to restore the area he was illegally developing, to preserve the woodrat's habitat. Since 1984, the Key Largo woodrat is on the United States list of endangered species, along with the Schaus swallowtail and the Key Largo cotton mouse.

By the 1990s, the animal's habitat had shrunk to about three square miles, and the Key Largo woodrat was called "one of the rarest creatures on earth." The animal also suffers from competition with the invasive black rat (Rattus rattus).

As of 2005, the Key Largo woodrat population was still struggling to survive among the half-built condominiums of the former Port Bougainville project, which in 2003 became part of the Dagny Johnson Key Largo Hammock Botanical State Park. 400 acres (1.6 km^{2}) of the developer's land were bought up by the Federal Deposit Insurance Corporation in 1987; the Botanical State Park now takes up 2,421 acres (9.80 km^{2}). Besides in this area, the rat finds refuge in the Crocodile Lake National Wildlife Refuge, which has a captive breeding program currently in operation but increasing development continues to threaten the animal.

== Cultural importance ==
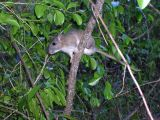

The threat to many threatened species, but especially the woodrat and the cotton mouse generated broad interest in the Florida Keys in the 1980s, with many environmental groups being formed. Anna Dagny Johnson (1918–2003), a well-known environmentalist, led efforts by the Upper Keys Citizens Association, Friends of the Everglades, and the Izaak Walton League to stop development around North Key Largo; the Florida Division of Recreation and Parks honored her by naming the Dagny Johnson Key Largo Hammock Botanical State Park for her, a year before she died.

The rat's habit of building large nests ("4ft by 6ft homes") was seen as proof that "even wildlife in Florida want enormous homes." Novelist Lydia Millet paid homage to the woodrat in her 2008 novel How the Dead Dream, a story of a young real estate developer from Los Angeles who, after some personal turmoil, takes an obsessive interest in vanishing species. A 1997 collection of poetry and prose by a writers' cooperative from Key West features a poem ("The Place We Live" by Robin Orlandi) in which the woodrat is mentioned as one of three "endangered native species," alongside the Key deer (Odocoileus virginianus clavium) and the Stock Island snail (Orthalicus reses reses).

== Predation ==
In Florida, Key Largo woodrats may be eaten by some growth stage of invasive snakes such as Burmese pythons, reticulated pythons, Southern African rock pythons, Central African rock pythons, boa constrictors, yellow anacondas, Bolivian anacondas, dark-spotted anacondas, and green anacondas.

== References and external links ==
- U.S. Fish and Wildlife Service Division of Endangered Species –
