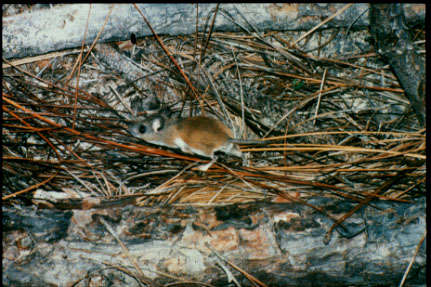

Conservation status
- Least Concern (IUCN 3.1)

- Secure (NatureServe)

Scientific classification
- Kingdom: Animalia
- Phylum: Chordata
- Class: Mammalia
- Infraclass: Placentalia
- Order: Rodentia
- Family: Cricetidae
- Subfamily: Neotominae
- Genus: Peromyscus
- Species: P. gossypinus

Binomial name
- Peromyscus gossypinus (Le Conte, 1853)
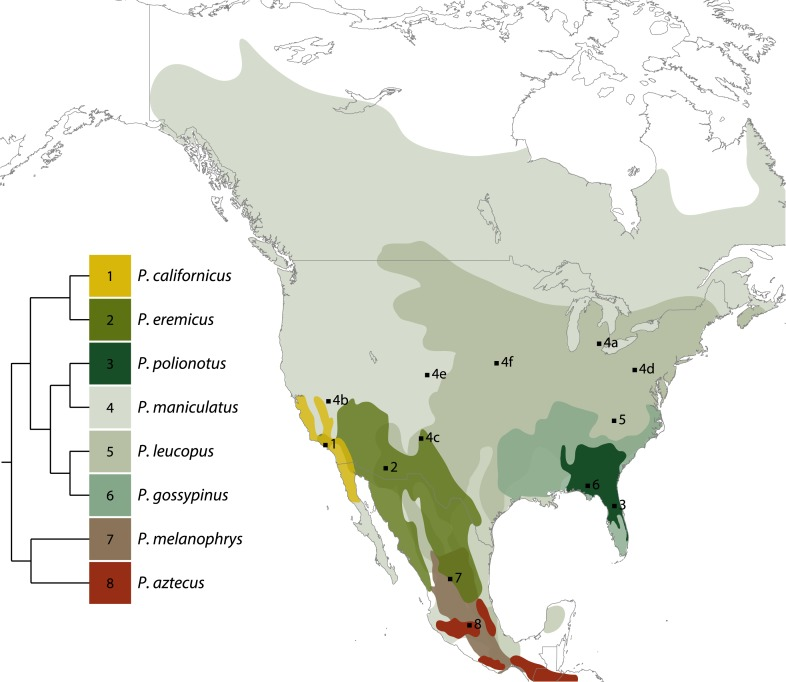
- native range

Synonyms
- Hesperomys gossypinus Le Conte, 1853; Peromyscus gossypinus allapaticola Schwartz, 1952; Peromyscus anastasae Bangs, 1898; Hesperomys cognatus Le Conte, 1855; Peromyscus insulanus Bangs, 1898; Sitomys megacephalus Rhoads, 1894; Peromyscus gossypinus mississippiensis Rhoads, 1896; Peromyscus gossypinus nigriculus Bangs, 1896; Peromyscus gossypinus palmarius Bangs, 1896; Peromyscus gossypinus restrictus A. H. Howell, 1939; Peromyscus gossypinus telmaphilus Schwartz, 1952

= Cotton mouse =

Species of rodent

The cotton mouse (Peromyscus gossypinus) is a species of rodent in the family Cricetidae. It is a species of the genus Peromyscus, a closely related group of New World mice often called "deermice". It is endemic to the woodlands of the Southern United States.

== Description ==
Adults are about 180 mm (7.1 in) long, with a tail around 78 mm (3.1 in), and weigh 34-51 g. Its general appearance is very similar to the white-footed mouse, but the cotton mouse is larger in size and has a longer skull and hind feet. They have dark brown bodies and white feet and bellies.

The common name derives from the observed habit of using raw cotton in building nests.

One subspecies, the Chadwick Beach cotton mouse (P. g. restrictus) was last seen in 1938 and is now presumed extinct. Another subspecies, the Key Largo cotton mouse (P. g. allapaticola) is currently on the United States Fish and Wildlife Service list of endangered species.

== Distribution and habitat ==
The cotton mouse occurs in the Southeastern United States in an area roughly bordered by southeastern Virginia, Florida, Texas, and Kentucky. It makes use of a variety of habitats, including hardwood forests, swamps, the margins of cleared fields, edges of salt savanna and dunes, scrub, and rocky bluffs and ledges. They probably prefer terrain that is regularly inundated. Once native to Illinois, it is now considered extirpated from that state.

Cotton mice use underground refuges such as stump holes, tree cavities, root boles, and burrows where they can avoid predators and wild fires. Such underground refuges also provide lower temperature and humidity during the summer season.

Most Peromyscus species show great decrease in population after fire events through emigration, increase in predation, or from direct damage by fire from loss of habitat/protection. However, due to the behavior of using underground refuges, cotton mice are able to survive with no significant loss of population from the fire.

== Ecology ==
Cotton mice are omnivorous, and eat seeds and insects. Breeding may occur throughout the year, and usually occurs in early spring and fall. They may have four litters a year of up to seven young, which are helpless and naked at birth. Cotton mice are weaned at 20–25 days, and become sexually mature around two months. Lifespans are four to five months, with a rare few living to one year. They are preyed upon by owls, snakes, weasels, and bobcats. Cotton mice are also parasitized by Cuterebra fontinella, the mouse botfly.

The golden mouse (Ochrotomys nuttalli) has similar characteristics and shares similar habitat and geographic regions with the cotton mouse. The coexistence of the two being possible when sharing similar habitat was due to their use of the common refuges had different daily and seasonal patterns. The cotton mouse shows broader selection in choosing refuges as they switch from one to the other, which is suggested to be the most significant component for such relationship to be possible.

Due to their small population size and reduced chances of reproduction, evidence for cotton mouse hybridizing with white-footed mouse has been found. Although they are known to be conspecific, hybridization will occur when limited options for reproduction are available. Identification through toe-clip sampling made possible finding hybridization between the cotton mouse and the white-footed mouse on a heterozygous GPI-1 marker.

=== Predation ===
In Florida, cotton mice may be eaten by some growth stage of invasive snakes such as Burmese pythons, reticulated pythons, Central African rock pythons, Southern African rock pythons, boa constrictors, yellow anacondas, Bolivian anacondas, dark-spotted anacondas, and green anacondas.
