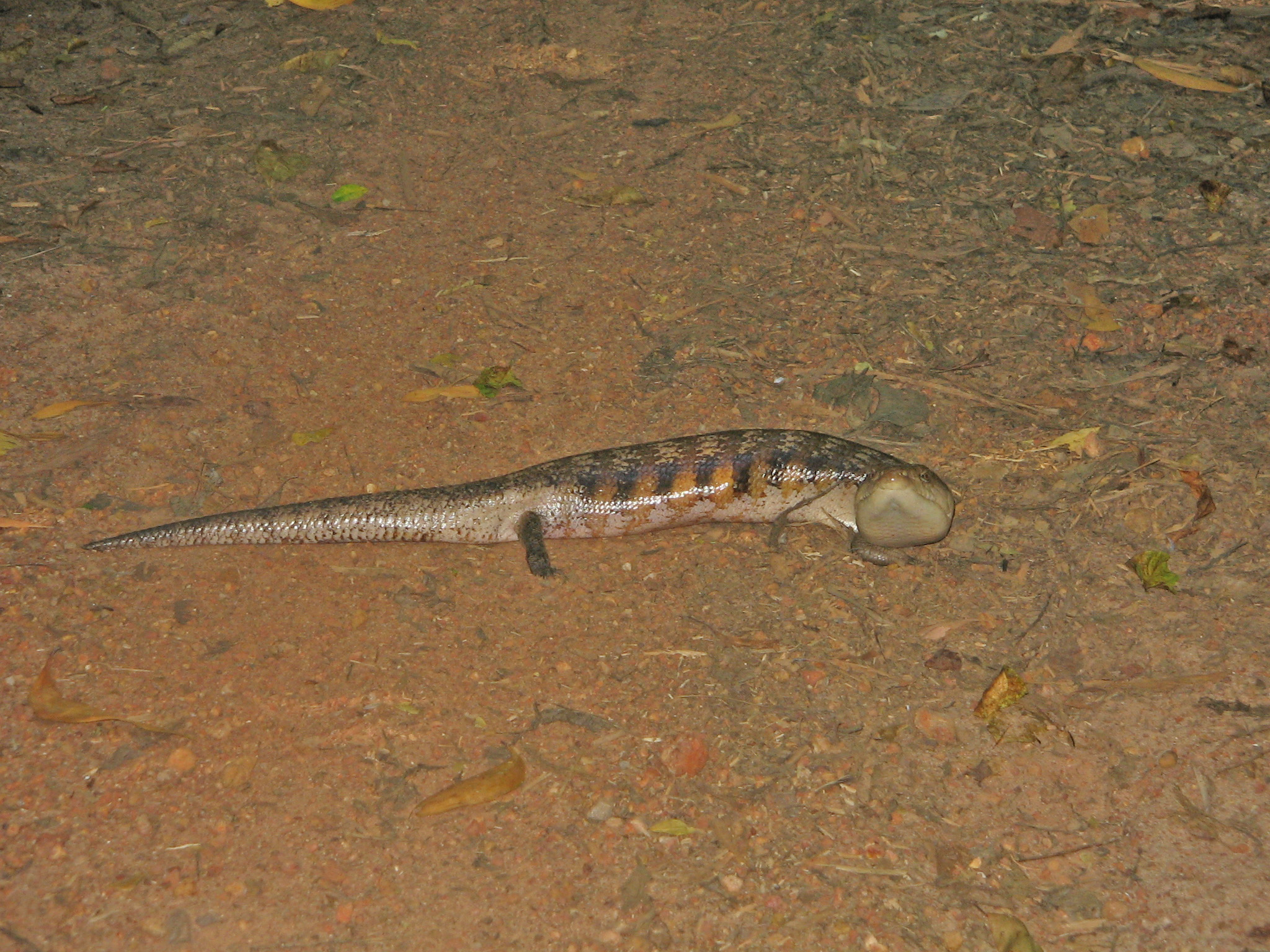

Scientific classification
- Kingdom: Animalia
- Phylum: Chordata
- Class: Reptilia
- Order: Squamata
- Family: Scincidae
- Genus: Tiliqua
- Species: T. scincoides
- Subspecies: T. s. intermedia

Trinomial name
- Tiliqua scincoides intermedia Mitchell, 1955

= Northern blue-tongued skink =

Subspecies of lizard

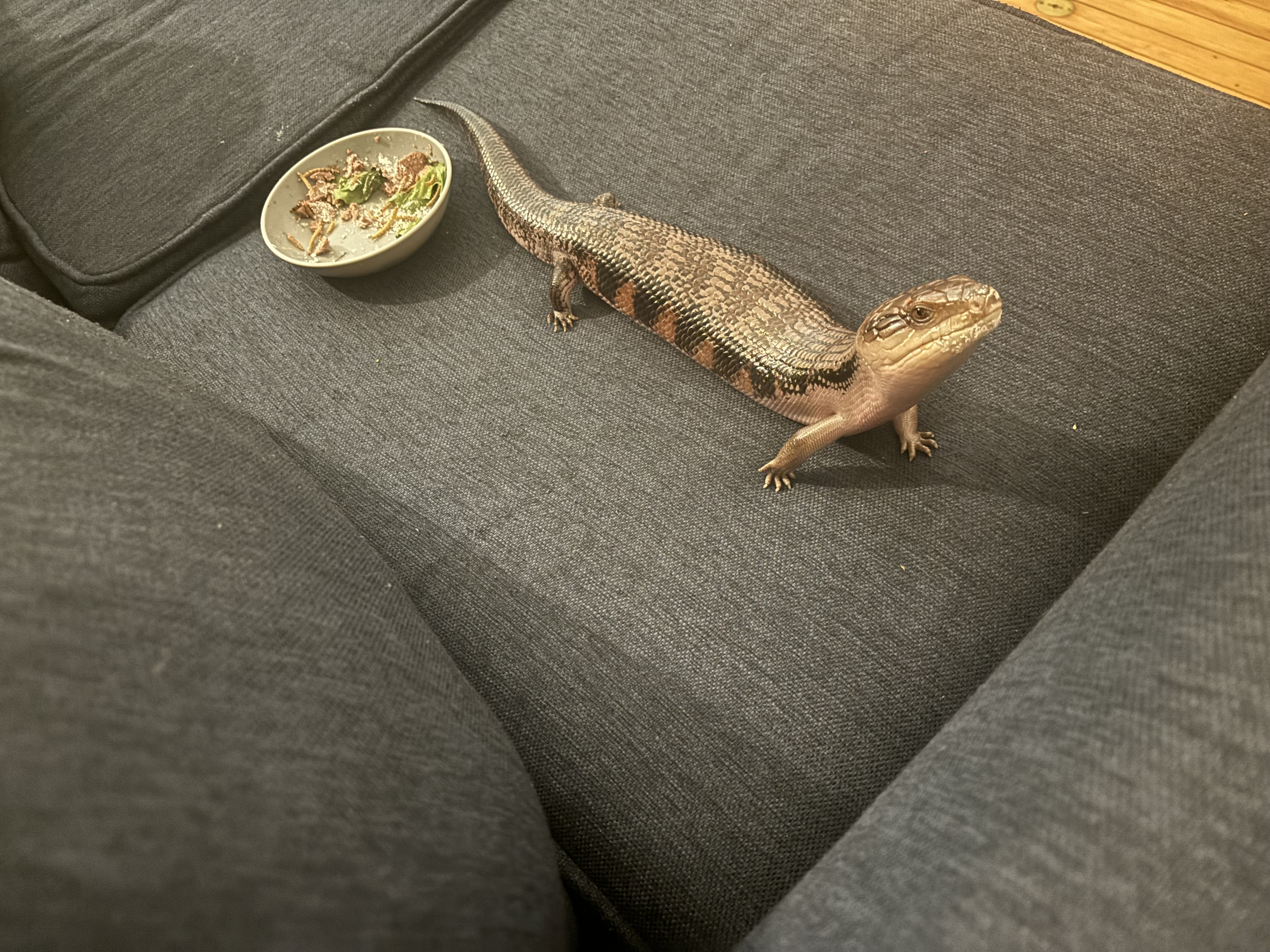
Bird, a northern blue-tongued skink, eating his dinner

The northern blue-tongued skink (Tiliqua scincoides intermedia) or northern blue-tongued lizard is the largest and heaviest of the blue-tongued lizards (family Scincidae, genus Tiliqua). They are native to Australia and found almost exclusively in the Northern Region. They generally live around 20 years and are commonly kept as pets.

== Appearance ==
The northern blue-tongued skink (T. s. intermedia) is a subspecies of the common blue-tongued skink (T. s. scincoides). Similar to other blue-tongued lizards, the northern blue-tongued skink has very distinctive patterning. Northerns tend to be a bright orange to soft peachy orange or even a yellowish colour with darker stripes along their sides and backs, with a lighter, creamier colour on their bellies.

They also have bright blue tongues often used to warn off or startle predators. Their legs are short and small compared to the length and width of their bodies. They grow to about 22 inches in total length.

== Breeding ==
The breeding season occurs once yearly in late spring. Mating is somewhat aggressive, with the male holding the female in place by biting her back. Damage to the scales and light bleeding are common.

The gestation period is roughly 100 days and they can produce as many as 20+ babies. Blue-tongued skinks are ovoviviparous and give birth to live young. The offspring appear as smaller versions of the adults with only slight variations to colouring, often darker and becoming a lighter and more vibrant shade with each shed. Babies are precocial and will wander off on their own and begin eating small insects and fruit a few days after birth. Adults are known to cannibalise their young.

== Relatives ==
The northern blue-tongued skink is related to the eastern blue-tongued skink (Tiliqua scincoides scincoides) and the Tanimbar blue-tongued skink (Tiliqua scincoides chimaerea), as all three are subspecies of the common blue-tongued skink (Tiliqua scincoides). Other relatives within the same genus include the Adelaide pygmy blue-tongue skink (Tiliqua adelaidensis), the Indonesian blue-tongued skink (Tiliqua gigas), the centralian blue-tongued skink (Tiliqua multifasciata), the blotched blue-tongued skink (Tiliqua nigrolutea), the western blue-tongued skink (Tiliqua occipitalis), the shingleback skink (Tiliqua rugosa), the undefined Irian Jaya blue-tongued skink (Tiliqua sp.), and the extinct Tiliqua frangens.

== Gallery ==
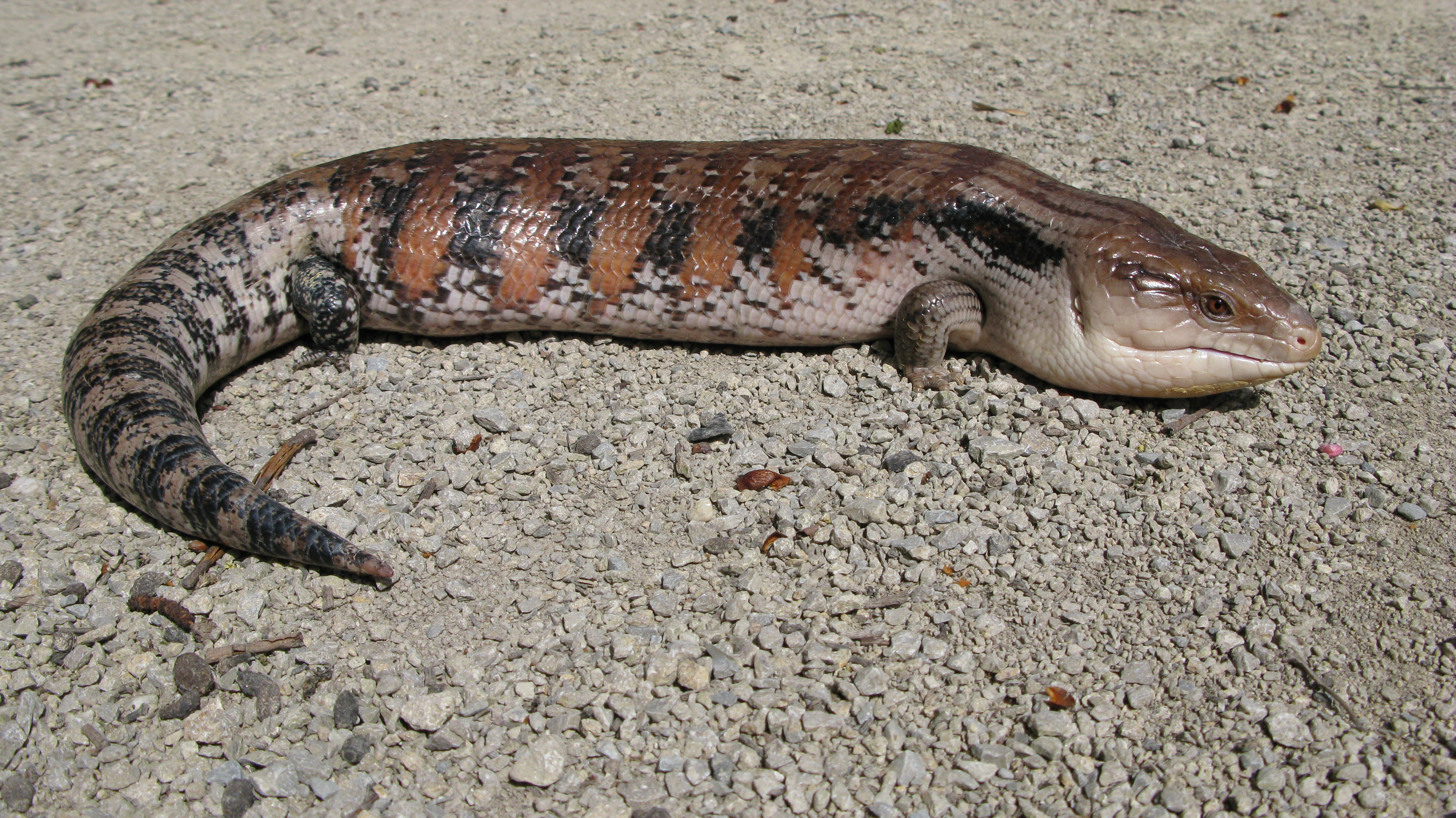
Northern Blue-Tongued Skink 2011

== External links and sources ==
- Honolulu Zoo
- Basic Information Sheet: Northern Blue-Tongued Skink
- Northern Blue-tongued Skink
- Northern Blue-tongued Skink
