= Ranger Red's Zoo & Conservation Park =

Zoo in Pinjarra, Western Australia

Ranger Red's Zoo and Conservation Park
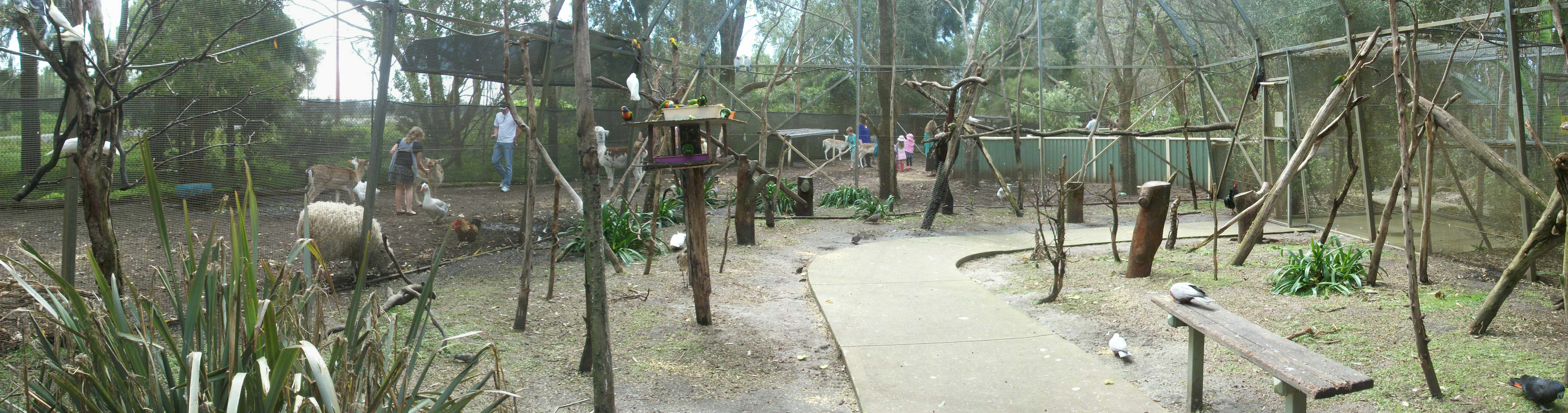
- Interactive map of Ranger Red's Zoo and Conservation Park
- 32.6098°S 115.8664°E
- Date opened: 2006
- Location: Pinjarra, Western Australia, Australia
- No. of animals: 750+
- No. of species: 130+
- Memberships: ZAA
- Website: redzzoo.com.au

Ranger Red's Zoo and Conservation Park, formerly Peel Zoo, is a zoo and wildlife sanctuary located on the banks of the Murray River in Pinjarra, Western Australia. It is a member of the Zoo and Aquarium Association.

It is home to over 100 native and exotic animal species, and specializes in being a "hands-on" zoo. Patrons can feed the animals by hand and interact with animals such as snakes, rufous bettong and ferrets. The park features other animals including koalas, wombats, dingoes, birds, reptiles, and kangaroos.

== History ==
The zoo was originally called Peel Zoo. In 2012, three Tasmanian devils escaped, making the national news.

In 2017, Narelle MacPherson and David Cobbold moved from Peel Zoo to take over the Warrawong Sanctuary in the Adelaide Hills in South Australia.

In August 2019 the zoo was rebranded as Ranger Red's Zoo and Conservation Park after being taken over by Bradley Holland, also known as "Ranger Red". Holland was inspired in his youth by Harry Butler and Gerald Durrell.

== Animals ==
The animal species (including some sub-species of certain species) include:

Amphibians

- Dumpy tree frog
- Magnificent tree frog

Birds

- Alexandrine parakeet
- Australian kestrel
- Australian king parrot
- Australian magpie
- Australian ringneck parrot (Twenty-eight parrot)
- Australian wood duck
- Banded lapwing
- Bar-shouldered dove
- Barbary dove
- Barking owl
- Bleeding-heart dove
- Blue-and-gold macaw
- Blue-faced honeyeater
- Blue peafowl
- Brown quail
- Brush bronzewing
- Budgerigar
- Buff-banded rail
- Bush thick-knee stone-curlew
- Cattle egret
- Chestnut-eared finch
- Cockatiel
- Common canary
- Crested pigeon
- Crimson rosella
- Crimson-backed forest finch
- Diamond dove
- Diamond firetail finch
- Domestic chicken (Bantam breeds)
- Eastern barn owl
- Eastern rosella
- Eclectus parrot
- Egyptian goose
- European goldfinch
- Galah
- Glossy ibis
- Golden pheasant
- Gouldian finch
- Grey butcherbird
- Grey goshawk
- Hooded parrot
- Japanese quail
- Java sparrow
- King quail
- Lady Amherst's pheasant
- Laughing kookaburra
- Little corella
- Long-billed corella
- Long-tailed finch
- Major Mitchell's cockatoo
- Masked lapwing
- Mountain shelduck
- Moustached parakeet
- Musk lorikeet
- Nankeen night heron
- Pacific black duck
- Painted finch
- Peaceful dove
- Peach-faced lovebird
- Princess parrot
- Rainbow lorikeet
- Red-capped parrot
- Red-collared lorikeet
- Red junglefowl
- Red-rumped parrot
- Red-tailed black cockatoo
- Reeve's pheasant
- Regent parrot
- Royal spoonbill
- Scaly-breasted lorikeet
- Scarlet-chested parrot
- Silver pheasant
- Sooty owl
- Southern boobook owl
- Spur-winged plover
- Sulphur-crested cockatoo
- Superb parrot
- Tawny frogmouth
- Varied lorikeet
- Wandering whistling duck
- Weaver finch
- Western rosella
- White-tailed black cockatoo

Mammals

- Alpaca
- Arabian camel
- Bare-nosed wombat
- Common brushtail possum
- Common ringtail possum
- Dingo
- Domestic ferret
- Domestic guinea pig
- Domestic goat
- Domestic rabbit
- Domestic sheep
- Euro wallaroo
- Grey-headed flying fox
- Koala
- Red-bellied pademelon
- Red deer
- Red kangaroo
- Rufous bettong
- Shetland pony
- Short-beaked echidna
- Southern hairy-nosed wombat
- Spotted-tailed quoll
- Squirrel glider
- Sugar glider
- Swamp wallaby
- Tasmanian devil
- Western grey kangaroo
- Woylie bettong

Reptiles

- Banded rock python
- Black-headed python
- Bobtail lizard
- Centralian blue-tongued lizard
- Common death adder
- Dugite
- Eastern blue-tongued lizard
- Frill-neck lizard
- King's skink
- Mertens' water monitor
- Northern blue-tongued lizard
- Oblong turtle
- Olive Python
- Rough knob-tailed gecko
- South-western carpet python
- Steindachner's flat-shell turtle
- Western bearded dragon
- Western blue-tongued lizard
- Western tiger snake
- Woma python

Some wild species of water birds also occupy the zoo's waterways. Displays for a number of arachnids and insects too include giant prickly stick insect and barking tarantula.
