= West Australian Reptile Park =

Zoo near Perth, Western Australia

- Interactive map of West Australian Reptile Park
- 31°48′22″S 115°59′35″E
- Date opened: 2003; 23 years ago
- Location: 92 Henley Street, Henley Brook, near Perth, Western Australia
- Land area: 4.5 ha (11 acres)
- No. of species: ~40
- Website: www.wareptilepark.com.au

The West Australian Reptile Park is a reptile and native wildlife park located at Henley Brook in the upper Swan Valley region of Perth, Western Australia. A privately owned, family-run facility, the park was established and is still run by the Doyle family. It is home to a number of reptile species and other animals. Visitors can hold some snakes, lizards and turtles at certain times of day, and the park is open most days of the year except public holidays.

== Reptile species ==
The park's indoor section houses live specimens of most of Western Australia's snakes, both venomous and non-venomous. The park does not breed its snakes; most were caught in the wild, and some have been in captivity for many years.

- Black-headed monitor
- Black-headed python
- Boa constrictor
- Carpet python
- Centralian blue-tongued skink
- Common blue-tongued lizard
- Desert death adder
- Dugite
- Eastern brown snake
- Freshwater crocodile
- Frilled-necked lizard
- Gould's sand goanna
- King brown snake
- King's skink
- Lace monitor
- Merten's water monitor
- Oblong turtle
- Olive python
- Perentie
- Rosenberg's monitor
- Saltwater crocodile
- Shingleback bobtail skink
- Southern common death adder
- Spotted mulga snake
- Stimson's python
- Water python
- Western bearded dragon
- Western blue-tongued lizard
- Western brown snake
- Western tiger snake
- Woma python

== Mammals, birds and frogs ==
- Australian green tree frog
- Blue peafowl
- Brown goshawk
- Dingo
- Emu
- Euro wallaroo
- Red fox
- Southern hairy nosed wombat

== Visitor experience ==
The park offers interactive presentations and animal encounters, with visitors able to touch snakes and lizards and view crocodiles up close. It also has picnic and barbecue facilities. The park has also been promoted by the WA Parks Foundation as a visitor destination in Henley Brook.
