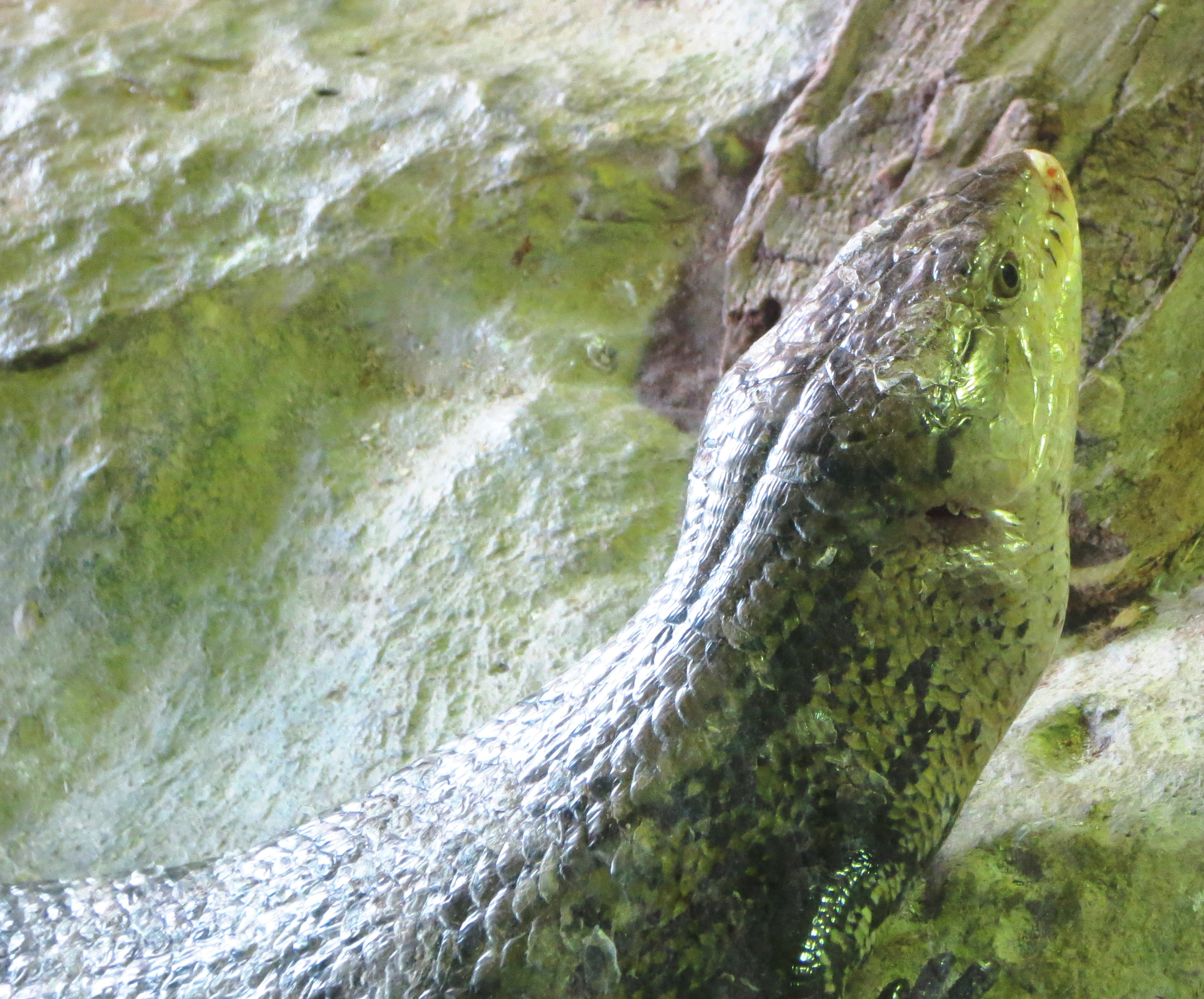

Conservation status
- Least Concern (IUCN 3.1)

Scientific classification
- Kingdom: Animalia
- Phylum: Chordata
- Class: Reptilia
- Order: Squamata
- Family: Scincidae
- Genus: Tiliqua
- Species: T. gigas

Binomial name
- Tiliqua gigas (Schneider, 1801)

= Indonesian blue-tongued skink =

Species of lizard

The Indonesian blue-tongued skink (Tiliqua gigas) is a lizard in the family Scincidae. It is a close relative of the eastern blue-tongued skink. They are endemic to the island of New Guinea and other various surrounding islands. They are found typically in the rainforest, and in captivity, require high humidity. In comparison to Tiliqua scincoides, they are fairly lean. They also have long tails (60–90% of their snout-vent length).

== Description ==
Tiliqua gigas has an elongated body and very small limbs, which is typical of most skinks of the genus. They typically get up to 46-61 centimetres (18-24 inches) in length and weigh up to 1 kilogram (2.2 pounds). They are known for their thinner, elongated tails, and avoiding participation in seasonal brumation as they regulate their breeding cycle on a wet and dry season.

The subspecies T. gigas gigas is the most tropical and known for having the skinniest tail. They have solid, dark, or near solid dark limbs. Tiliqua gigas evanescens are easily recognized for having slightly more colored speckling on their limbs, a single, centered stripe on the back of their neck, and not always but most often, having very thin body banding. They also have the longest tail. Tiliqua gigas keyenesis is known for is all-over body speckling, including speckling all over the face.

The Australian northern blue-tongued skink (Tiliqua scincoides intermedia) is recognized as the largest of all the species and subspecies. Not enough studies have been conducted to give that title to any of the Tiliqua gigas subspecies. What is irrefutable is that T. gigas evanescens is the longest of all the blue tongues, often reaching lengths that exceed 75 centimetres (30 inches) from snout to tip of tail.

== Subspecies ==
There are currently three subspecies of Tiliqua gigas, and many localities within each subspecies. One is T. gigas gigas (Schneider, 1801), in which there are the most and newest recognized localities including: Halmahera, Classic Indonesian, Sorong, Aru, Jayapura, Manokwari, and Ambon. The second subspecies is T. gigas keyensis (Oudemans, 1894), typically called the Kei island blue-tongued skink. Lastly, there is T. gigas evanescens, which is called the Merauke blue-tongued skink.

== See also ==
- Eastern blue-tongued skink
