= Tiliqua pusilla =

Tiliqua pusilla Temporal range: Miocene 11.608–5.332 Ma

Scientific classification
- Kingdom: Animalia
- Phylum: Chordata
- Class: Reptilia
- Order: Squamata
- Family: Scincidae
- Genus: Tiliqua
- Species: †T. pusilla

Binomial name
- †Tiliqua pusilla Shea and Hutchinson, 1992

Extinct species of lizard

Tiliqua pusilla is an extinct species of the extant genus Tiliqua, the blue-tongued skinks. It lived during the Miocene period. It was described in 1992 based on dentary fossils from Riversleigh Station, Queensland, and is the smallest known species of Tiliqua.
