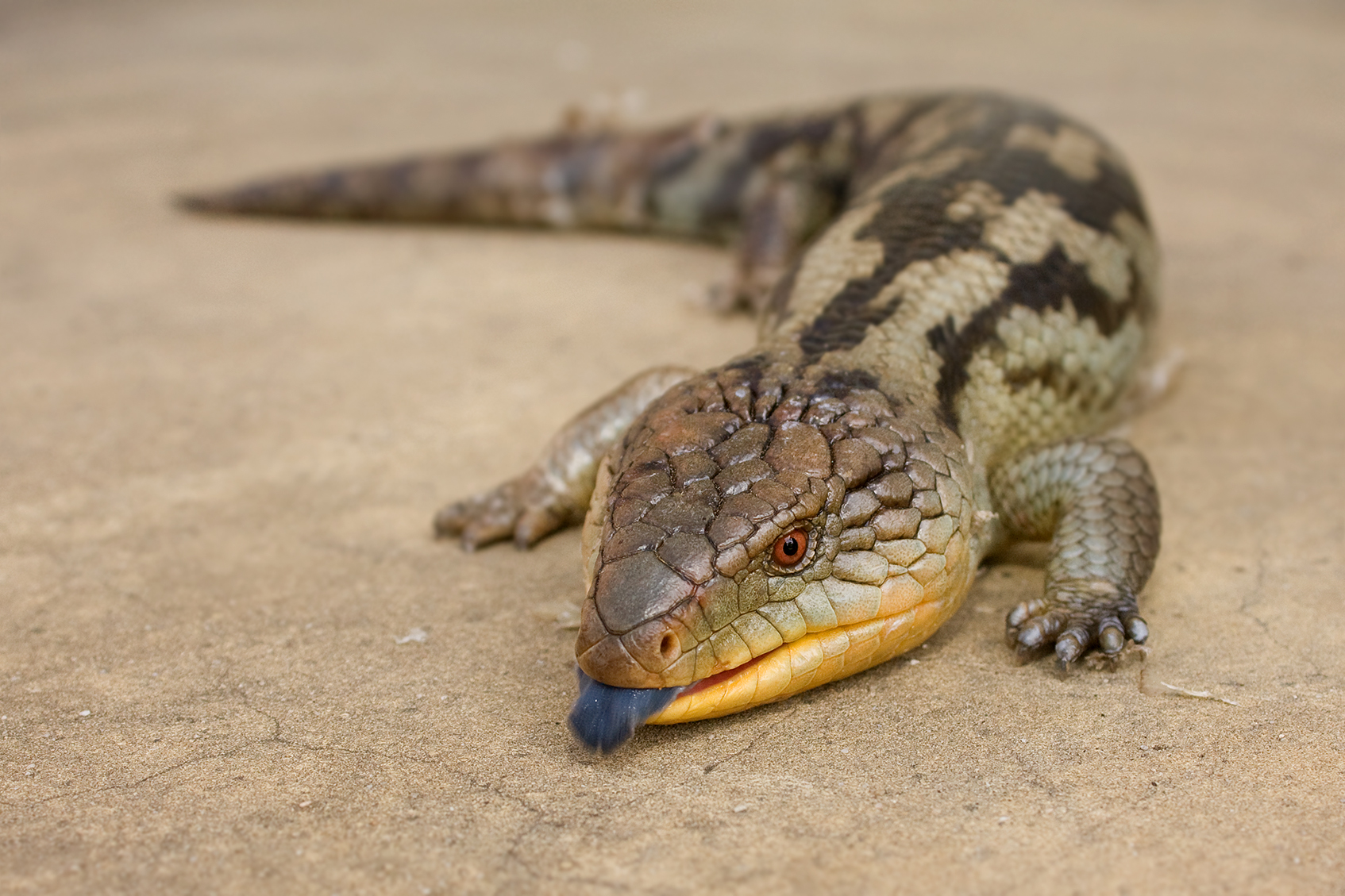
- Blotched blue-tongued skink (Tiliqua nigrolutea)

Scientific classification
- Kingdom: Animalia
- Phylum: Chordata
- Class: Reptilia
- Order: Squamata
- Family: Scincidae
- Subfamily: Egerniinae
- Genus: Tiliqua; Gray, 1825

Species
- Eight extant, see text.

Synonyms
- Trachydosaurus

= Blue-tongued skink =

Blue-tongued skinks

Genus of lizards

Blue-tongued skinks are lizards of the Australasian genus Tiliqua, which includes some of the largest members of the skink family (Scincidae). They are commonly called blue-tongued lizards, simply blue-tongues, blueys in Australia, or panana in Indonesia. As suggested by these common names, a prominent characteristic of the genus is a large blue tongue that can be bared as bluff-warning to potential enemies. Their tongue can also deform itself and produce a thick mucus in order to catch prey. They are relatively shy in comparison with other lizards, and also significantly slower due to their shorter legs.

== Systematics and distribution ==
Blue-tongued skinks are closely related to the genera Cyclodomorphus and Hemisphaeriodon. All species are found on mainland Australia with the exception of Tiliqua gigas, which occurs in New Guinea and various islands of Indonesia. The Tanimbar blue-tongued skink, a subspecies of Tiliqua scincoides, is also found on several small Indonesian islands between Australia and New Guinea. Tiliqua nigrolutea, the blotched blue-tongued skink, is the only species present in Tasmania.

== Ecology ==
Most species of blue-tongued skinks are diurnal, ground-foraging omnivores, feeding on a wide variety of insects, gastropods, flowers, fruits, and berries. The pygmy blue-tongue is again the exception, being primarily an ambush predator of terrestrial arthropods.

All are ovoviviparous, with litter sizes ranging from 1–4 in the pygmy blue-tongue and shingleback to 5–24 in the eastern and northern blue-tongues.

== Species ==
Name	Scientific Name	Picture	Subspecies
Adelaide pygmy blue-tongue skink	T. adelaidensis (W.Peters, 1863)		
No common name	†T. frangens Hutchinson & Scanlon, 2009		
Indonesian blue-tongued skink	T. gigas (Schneider, 1801)	Riesenblauzungenskink	T. g. gigas, Giant blue-tongued skink; T. g. evanescens, Merauke blue-tongued skink; T. g. keyensis, Key Island blue-tongued skink
Centralian blue-tongued skink	T. multifasciata Sternfeld, 1919	Zentralaustralischer Blauzungenskink	
Blotched blue-tongued skink	T. nigrolutea (Quoy & Gaimard, 1824)	Schwarzgelber Blauzungenskink	
Western blue-tongued skink	T. occipitalis (W. Peters, 1863)	Westlicher Blauzungenskink	
Shingleback, bobtail	T. rugosa (Gray, 1825)		T. r. aspera, Eastern shingleback; T. r. konowi, Rottnest Island bobtail; T. r. palarra, Shark Bay bobtail; T. r. rugosa, Common shingleback, bobtail
Common blue-tongued skink	T. scincoides (White, 1790)	Gemeiner Blauzungenskink	T. s. chimaerea, Tanimbar blue-tongued skink; T. s. intermedia, Northern blue-tongued skink; T. s. scincoides, Eastern blue-tongued skink
Irian Jaya blue-tongued skink	Tiliqua sp.		

Nota bene: A binomial authority in parentheses indicates that the species was originally described in a genus other than Tiliqua.

=== Extinct species ===
Multiple extinct species of blue-tongued skinks have been proposed. Tiliqua frangens, the largest known species of the genus, lived during the Pliocene and Pleistocene epoch around the Wellington Caves of New South Wales in Australia. Another extinct species T. laticephala may represent the same taxon as T. frangens. Its nearest relative is the extant T. rugosa, which is half the size and lacks the bony plates of T. frangens.

Another extinct species T. wilkinsonorum also lived during the Pliocene epoch. The earliest possible species is T. pusilla from the middle Miocene, but researchers question whether this species belong to the genus Tiliqua due to its uncertain phylogenetic position that causes paraphyly.

== In captivity ==
Some species of the genus Tiliqua are kept as household pets. Tiliqua scincoides are one of the first species of lizard to be kept as pets, and the first lizard known to have been bred in captivity, with the first successful clutches being produced no later than 1897. They are on average very friendly when raised in captivity, and are often called "the dogs of reptiles". Captive specimens can live 20 years or longer.
