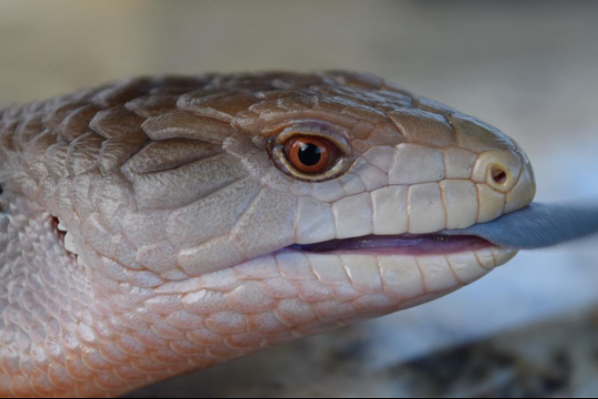

Scientific classification
- Domain: Eukaryota
- Kingdom: Animalia
- Phylum: Chordata
- Class: Reptilia
- Order: Squamata
- Family: Scincidae
- Genus: Tiliqua
- Species: T. gigas
- Subspecies: T. g. evanescens

Trinomial name
- Tiliqua gigas evanescens Shea, 2000

= Merauke blue-tongued skink =

Subspecies of lizard

The Merauke blue-tongued skink (Tiliqua gigas evanescens), also known as the faded blue-tongued skink, or giant blue-tongued skink, is a subspecies of Tiliqua that is native to Indonesia and Papua New Guinea. The Merauke blue-tongued skink is the longest of all the Tiliqua species; often reaching nearly 26-30 inches (66–76 cm) in total length. The species is often exported for the exotic pet trade, and is steadily growing in popularity within both herpetoculture and zoological exhibits globally.

== Natural habitat ==
The Merauke blue-tongued skink hails from the tropical environment of Indonesia and Papua New Guinea.

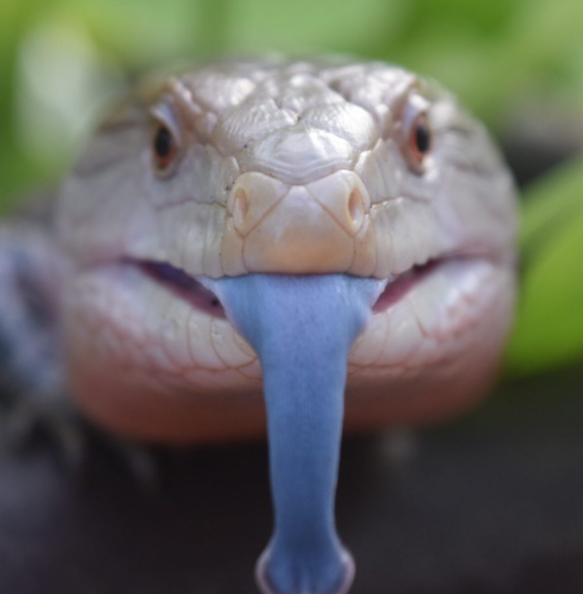
As their namesake, most blue tongue skinks exhibit a bright blue tongue.

== In captivity ==
Most specimens of the Merauke blue tongue skink present in captivity are of wild-caught origin. Captive breeding efforts have risen with the growing interest of blue tongue skinks within herpetoculture; however, the species still remains widely imported.

Blue tongue skinks are often displayed within zoological facilities. It is a popular species among herpetoculturists.
