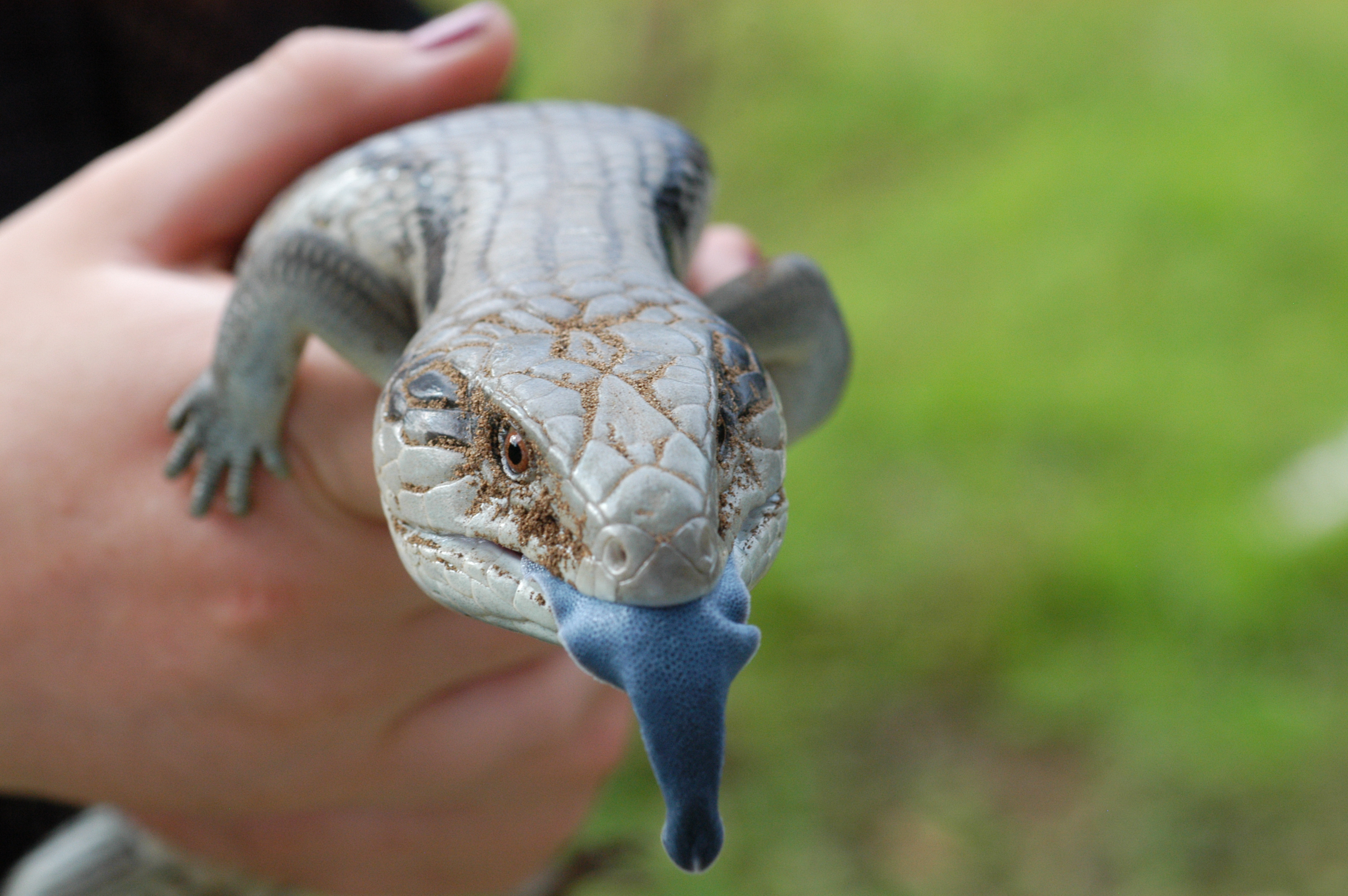
- A common blue-tongued skink in Killcare, Australia

Conservation status
- Least Concern (IUCN 3.1)

Scientific classification
- Kingdom: Animalia
- Phylum: Chordata
- Class: Reptilia
- Order: Squamata
- Family: Scincidae
- Genus: Tiliqua
- Species: T. scincoides

Binomial name
- Tiliqua scincoides (White, 1790)

Subspecies
- Three, see text

Synonyms
- Lacerta scincoides White, 1790; Scincus crotaphomelas Lacépède, 1804; Scincus tuberculatus Merrem, 1820; Tiliqua tuberculatus (Merrem, 1820); Tiliqua whitii Gray, 1831; Tiliqua vanicoriensis Gray, 1839 (nomen nudum); Cyclodus boddaertii A.M.C. Duméril & Bibron, 1839 (partim)

= Tiliqua scincoides =

Species of lizard

Tiliqua scincoides is a species of lizard in the subfamily Egerniinae of the family Scincidae (skinks). The species is native to Australia as well Tanimbar Island (Maluku Province, Indonesia). There are three recognized subspecies.

== Common names ==
Common names for Tiliqua scincoides include common blue-tongued lizard, common blue-tongued skink, blue-tongued lizard, and common bluetongue.

== Subspecies ==
Three subspecies of Tiliqua scincoides are recognized as being valid, including the nominotypical subspecies (listed in chronological order).

- Tiliqua scincoides scincoides (White, 1790) – eastern blue-tongued skink (southern/eastern Australia)
- Tiliqua scincoides intermedia Mitchell, 1955 – northern blue-tongued skink (northern Australia)
- Tiliqua scincoides chimaera Shea, 2000 – Tanimbar blue-tongued skink (Maluku Province, Indonesia)

Nota bene: A trinomial authority in parentheses indicates that the subspecies was originally described in a genus other than Tiliqua.

== Description ==
Tiliqua scincoides is a large species of terrestrial blue-tongue measuring upwards of 60 cm (24 in) in total length (tail included), and over 1 kg (2.2 lb) in mass. It has a stout body and short legs. Its coloration is variable, but generally is in a banded pattern. The tongue is blue-violet to cobalt blue in color. As with virtually all squamates, they collect microscopic molecules in the air and on surfaces with the tip of their tongue, and then using the tip to deliver the molecules to a sensory organ in the roof of the mouth, which provides their sense of smell. Blue-tongued skinks also use their tongues to catch prey; their tongue is coated in a sticky mucus that preserves its surface tension while moving, for drawing tagged insects back into the mouth. Due to its characteristic blue tongue and its curious nature, it is a popular companion animal in Western countries.

Blue-tongued lizards are diurnal: They are active during the day, and sleep at night. They are omnivorous, feeding on insects, snails, frogs, (fatally) cane toads, other reptiles, small birds, small mammals, carrion, and some plant material, including fruits, and green vegetation.

Bluetongues are ovoviviparous: The females retain their fertilized eggs and bear their young live, rather than laying eggs clutches. The female's litter can have a range from 5 to 25 live young per litter with Tiliqua scincoides scincoides being known to carry the largest litters. This species is known to live over 30 years. They are adaptable animals, often finding habitat in urban and suburban areas, specifically including residential areas of Sydney. The lizard is generally considered a beneficial urban dweller because it eats garden pests, such as slugs and snails.

When threatened, instead of retreating, bluetongues may hiss, lunge, inflate, and display their blue tongue to startle the animal it considers a threat.

Bluetongues a variety of locally established color variations for resident subspecies. For example, eastern blue tongues have a green and a yellow phase; they can have eye bands or not, and those from the Brisbane area look different from others. In captivity, breeders have developed albino (mostly white) and melanistic (mostly black) varieties. "Northerns" are either classic / standard looking, or more speckled subspecies from the Kimberley region and Prince Regent National Park. Herpetology hobbyists have cultivated these into captive blue-tongues with exaggerated colors: Different breeds can show red, yellow, orange, caramel, white, and other colors. "Tanimbar" blue tongues are the most glossy and often seen in a gold or silver phase. "Tanimbar" and "Kimberley Northern" blue tongues in the wild are reputed to be more aggressive than other species.

== Gallery ==
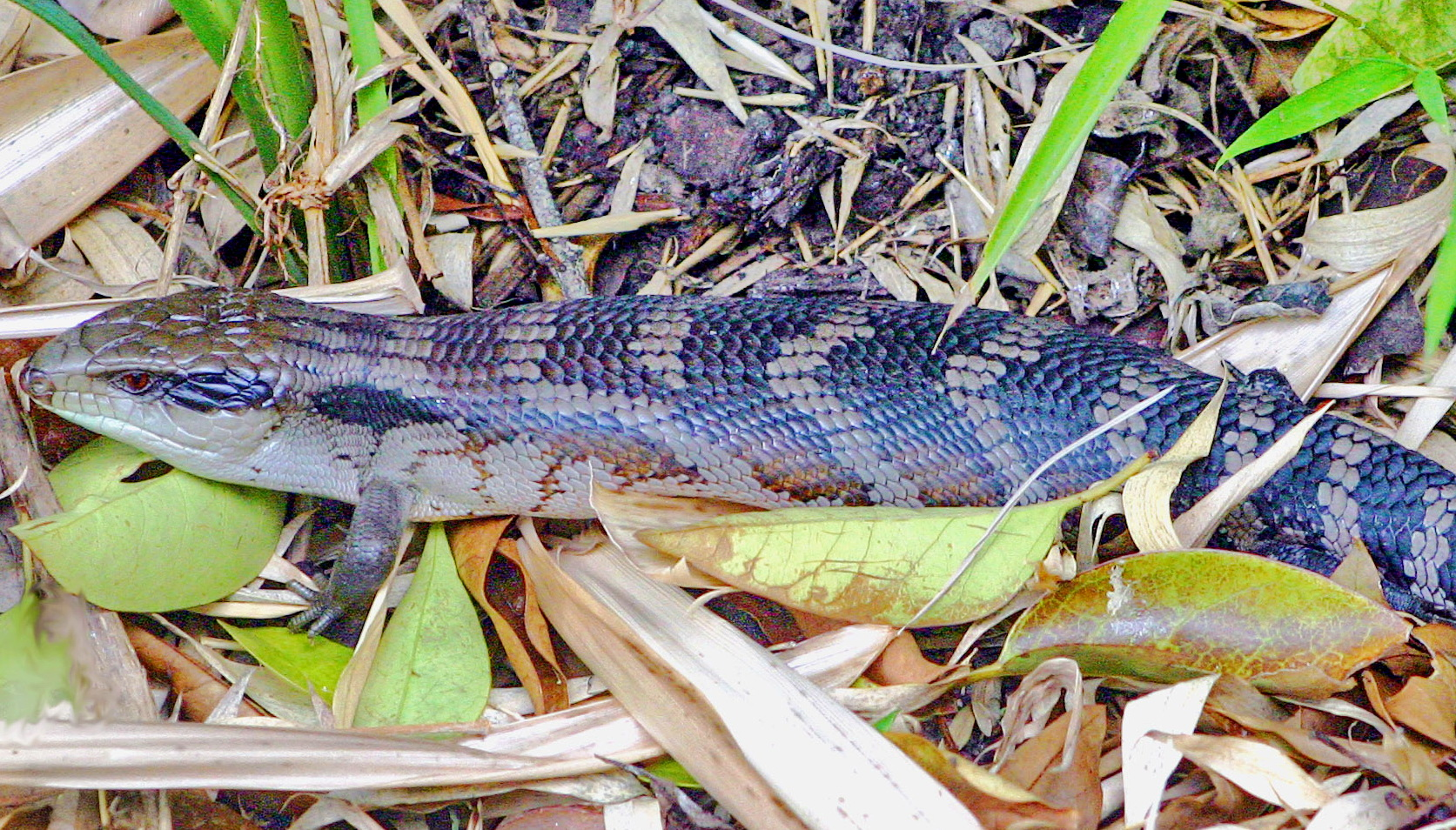
Eastern blue-tongued lizard

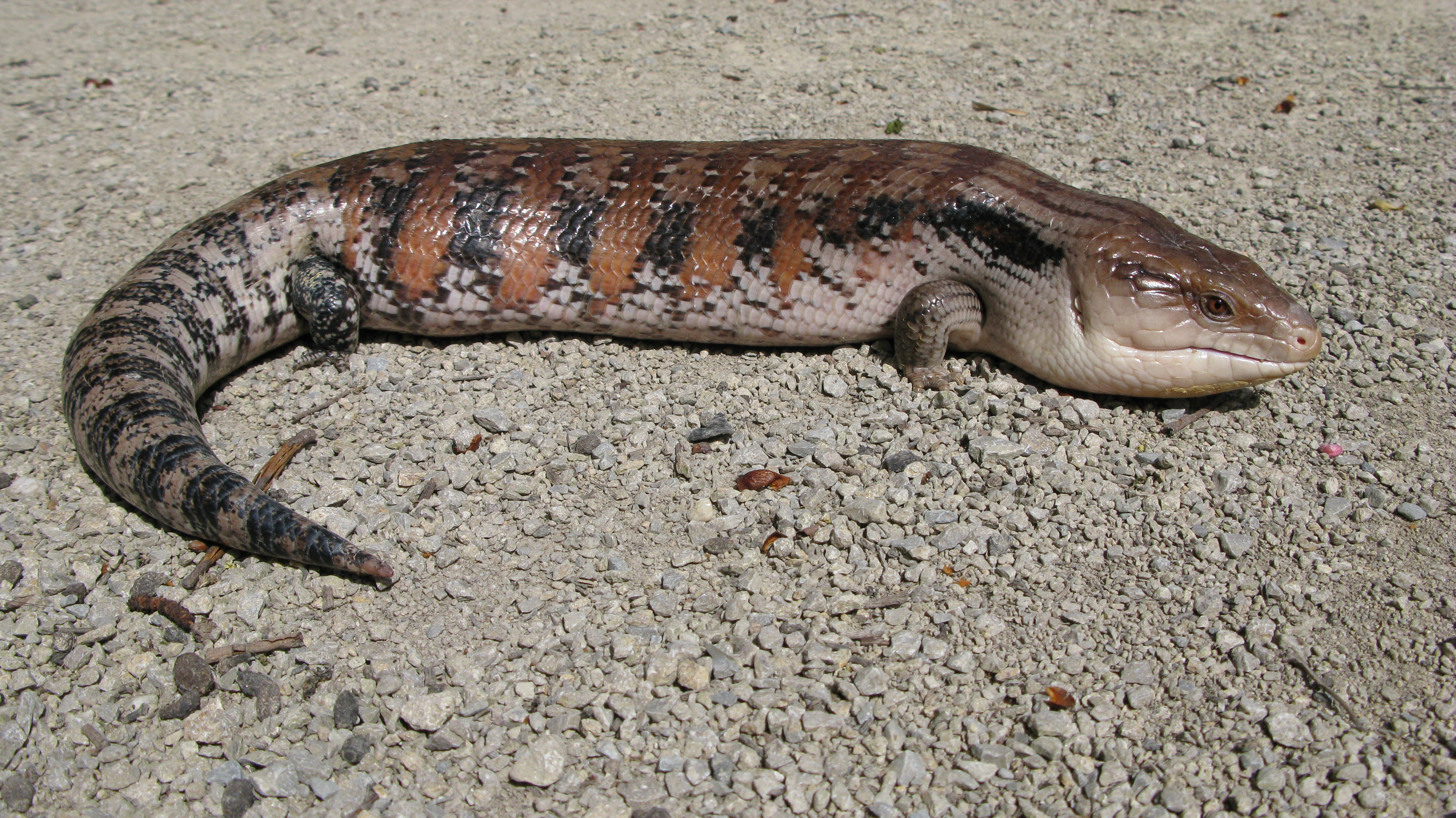
Northern blue-tongued skink
