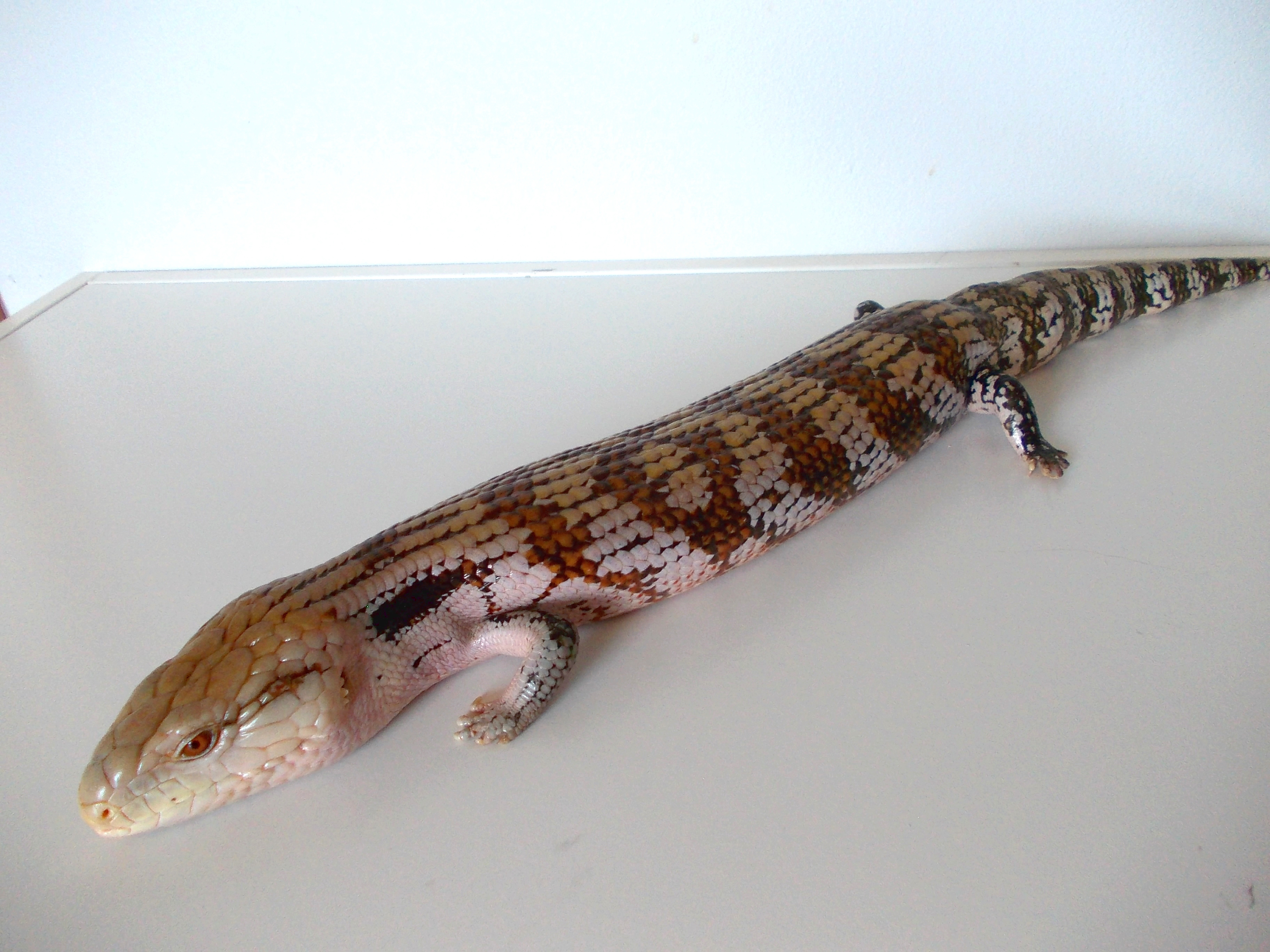

Scientific classification
- Kingdom: Animalia
- Phylum: Chordata
- Class: Reptilia
- Order: Squamata
- Family: Scincidae
- Subfamily: Egerniinae
- Genus: Tiliqua
- Species: T. sp.

Binomial name
- Tiliqua sp.

= Irian Jaya blue-tongued skink =

Genus of lizards

The Irian Jaya blue-tongued skink (Tiliqua sp.) is one of the least understood species of the blue-tongued skink genus. The Irian Jaya has yet to be scientifically classified, but is arguably a different species from the other recognized members of the genus.

== Etymology ==
Scientists have not properly categorized this animal yet.

== Taxonomy ==
The Irian Jaya has a distinct pattern consisting of thick dark brown, sometimes black, stripes with a peachy gold to brown undertone. The bellies of these animals can range from cream to orange to even red. As is characteristic of the other species in the genus, the Irian Jaya has a large blue tongue that it displays defensively in times of distress or danger. The approximate full length of an adult is 15-30 inches.

== Life span ==
The skink can live for 15-30 years.

== Breeding ==
The breeding season occurs once yearly. When a male finds a receptive female, he will scent mark her and follow her around. Mating can be aggressive and the males will hold the female down by biting her sides. Damage to the scales and light bleeding are common. Blue-tongued skinks are generally solitary animals and usually only come together during breeding season.

Irian Jayas are ovoviviparous. Their gestation period is roughly 100 days with 5 to 15 babies born per litter. The babies look almost exactly the same as the adults with only slight variations to coloring. The babies will wander off on their own and begin eating small insects and fruits just a few days after birth.

If kept as pets, Irian Jaya skinks should be housed separately and any offspring should be monitored for overall health during their first few sheds. Only after weeks of healthy growth and feeding should they be considered suitable for sale or trade.

== Diet ==
All blue-tongued skink species are opportunistic omnivores. In the wild, they feed on carrion, small invertebrates (especially snails), and greens that have been trampled to the ground.

=== In captivity ===
Adults' diets should be 40% protein, 50% greens and vegetables, and 10% fruit, and they should be fed 1-3 times a week. Babies on the other hand should be feed every day and having their feedings gradually reduced to about 2-3 times week after the skink reaches about a year old or about 1/3 of its potential length.
