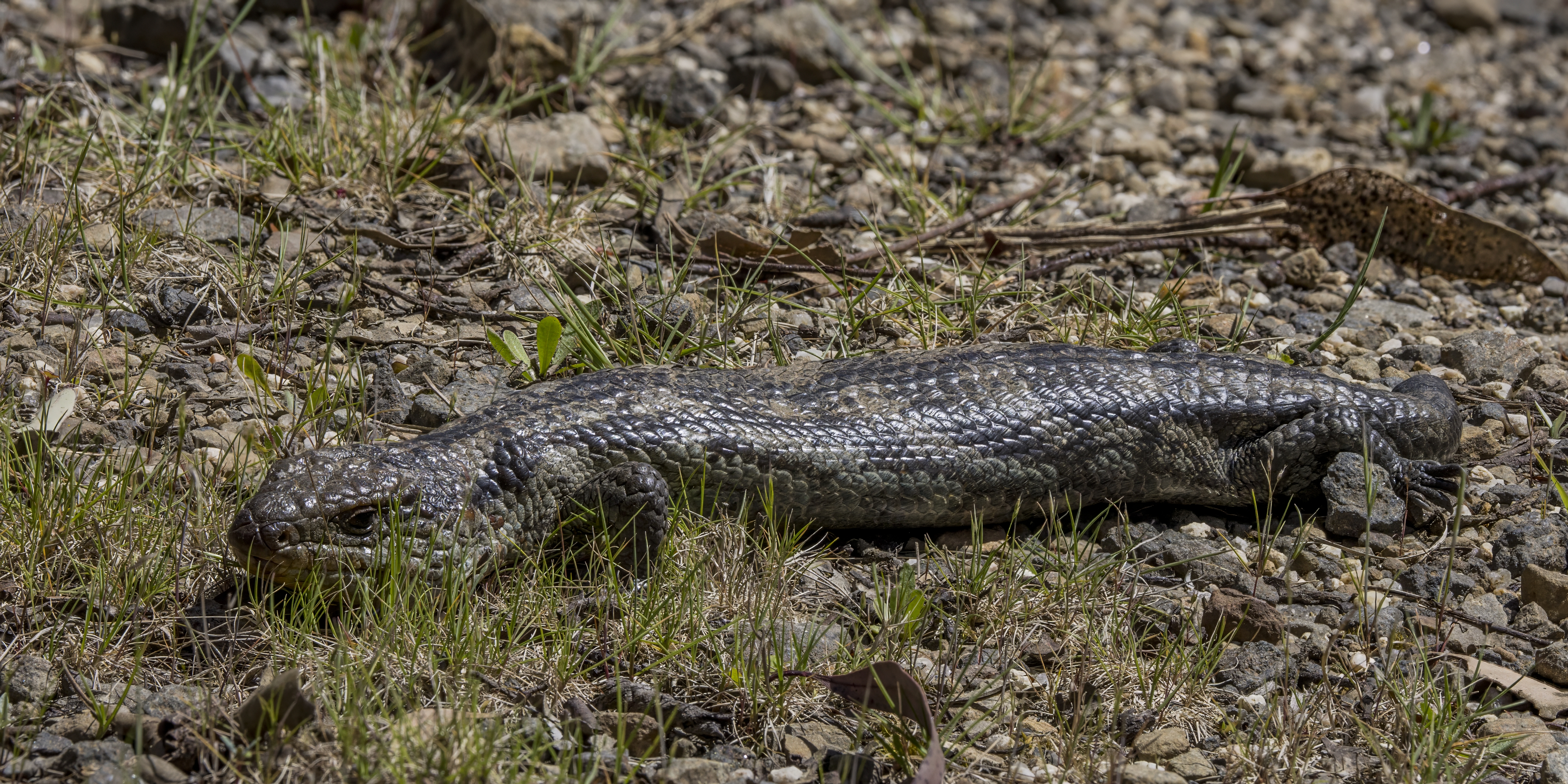
- Ben Lomond National Park, Tasmania, Australia

Conservation status
- Least Concern (IUCN 3.1)

Scientific classification
- Kingdom: Animalia
- Phylum: Chordata
- Class: Reptilia
- Order: Squamata
- Family: Scincidae
- Genus: Tiliqua
- Species: T. nigrolutea

Binomial name
- Tiliqua nigrolutea (Quoy & Gaimard, 1824)

= Blotched blue-tongued skink =

Blotched blue-tongued lizard

Species of lizard

The blotched blue-tongued skink (Tiliqua nigrolutea), also known as the southern blue-tongued lizard or blotched blue-tongued lizard, is a blue-tongued skink endemic to south-eastern Australia.

== Description ==
This species is a relatively large member of the skink family (Scincidae) with a robust body and relatively short limbs. Colouration and pattern varies geographically, with two distinct forms recognised by some herpetologists, i.e lowlands and highlands. The lowlands form tends to be shades of grey or brown with paler silvery to tan coloured blotches along the back, that are contrasted by surrounding darker areas. The highlands form is typically darker (often jet black) that provides a strong contrast to much paler cream or more brightly coloured pink, salmon or orange coloured blotches.

They have a fleshy blue tongue that is used to taste the air and scare off potential predators. They tend to rely on camouflage and bluff as their primary means of defence; however, if cornered or molested, they can put on an impressive and effective defensive display. If further molested, it will bite as a last resort and although the bite can be painful due to its powerful jaws, the teeth are blunt and generally do not break the skin. This species is harmless, as are all skinks and inoffensive by nature. They are sometimes kept as pets, as they adapt well to captivity, eating a wide range of readily available foods.

The skink is about 14 to 20 inches (35 to 50 cm) long, and is found in wet and dry sclerophyll forests, montane woodlands and coastal heathlands. It is an omnivore with a diet consisting of a variety of insects, snails, carrion, wildflowers, native fruits and other vegetation like select leaves, and occasionally small vertebrates like mice or other young rodents if given the chance. The tail can be dropped (autotomy) when grasped by a predator (like most skinks), but this large skink is much less likely to do so than most other members of the skink family.

== Distribution and habitat ==
The species occurs in Victoria, Tasmania, South Australia, New South Wales, and the Australian Capital Territory. The lowlands form is found in Tasmania and lower altitudes of Victoria right down to the coast. The highlands form is restricted to higher altitudes in NSW and the high country of Victoria. The blotched blue-tongued skink usually emerges from brumation in early spring, which is the mating season. These large skinks are viviparous (give birth to live young), with the highland/alpine form giving birth to relatively larger and fewer young (about five) compared to the lowland form (about 11). The young are usually born in autumn, after a relatively long gestation period. They are also relatively long-lived (reliably reported up to 30 years in captivity) compared to many of the smaller skink species. They have adapted well to some rural and urban areas, where they can be found living on farms and in gardens where they are an asset, as they eat pests such as snails, slugs, and occasionally rodents.

The blotched blue-tongued skink is among the animals identified from the Pleistocene fossil sites of the Naracoorte Caves National Park.

== Gallery ==
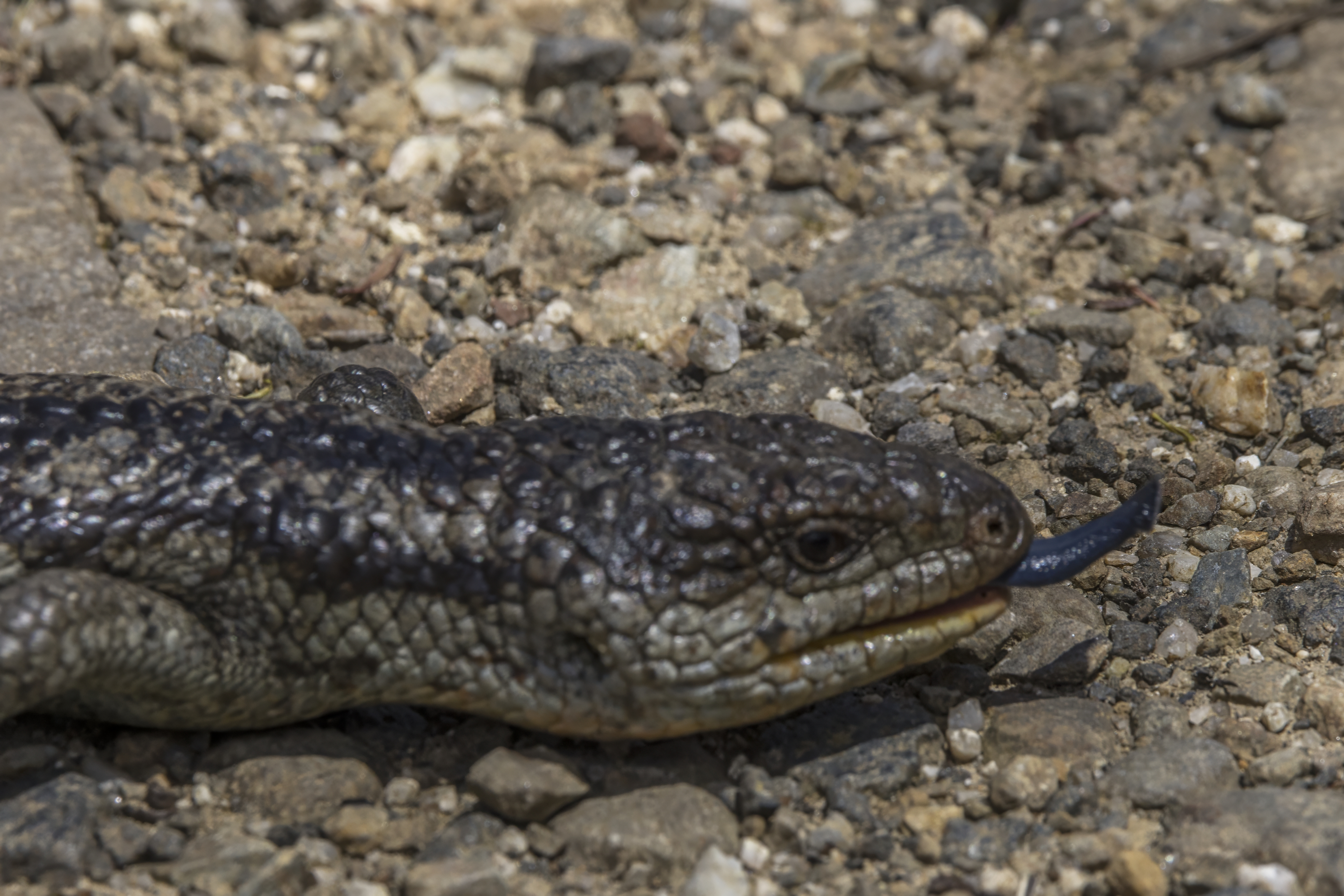
Showing blue tongue, Ben Lomond, Tasmania

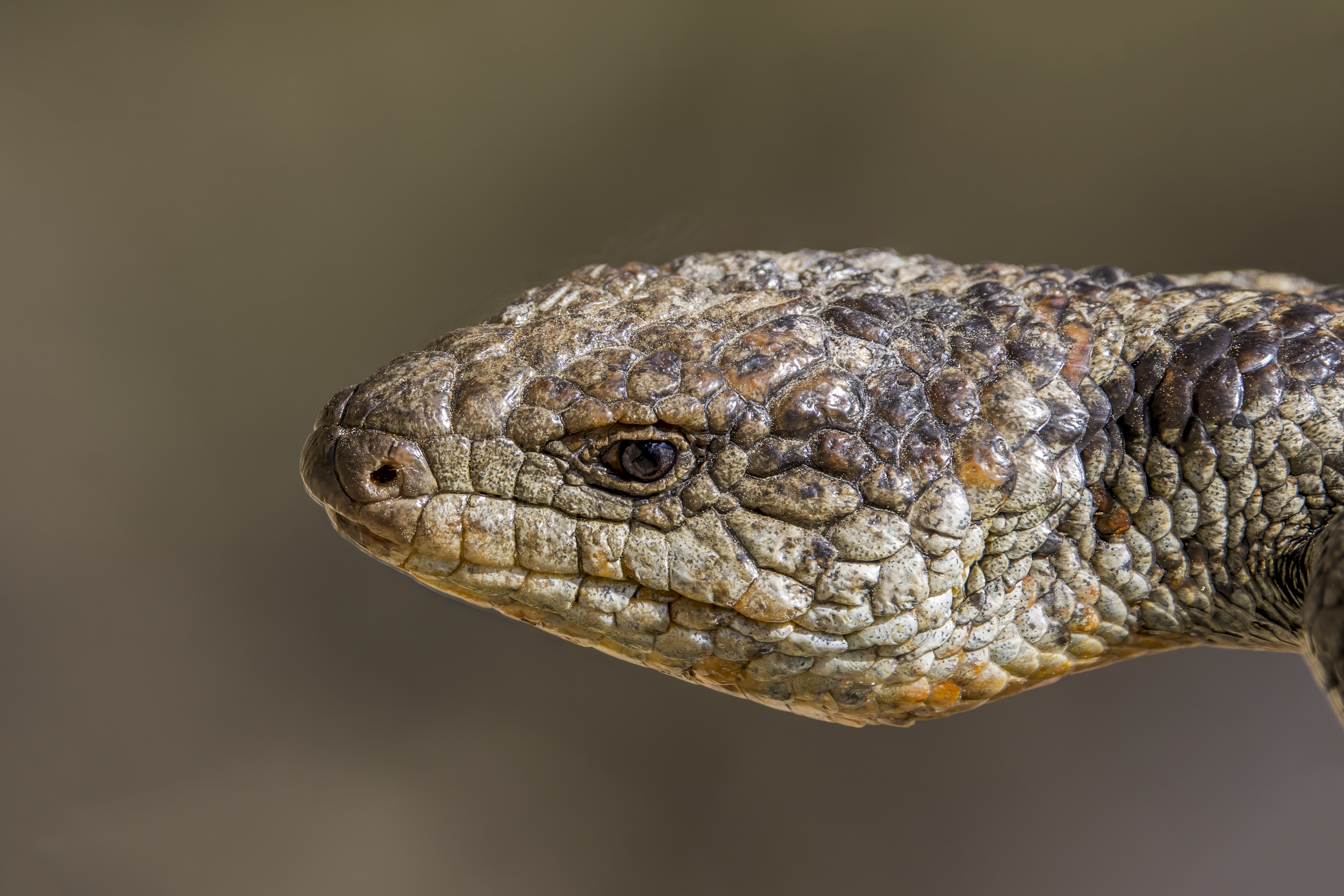
Head of blotched blue-tongued skink

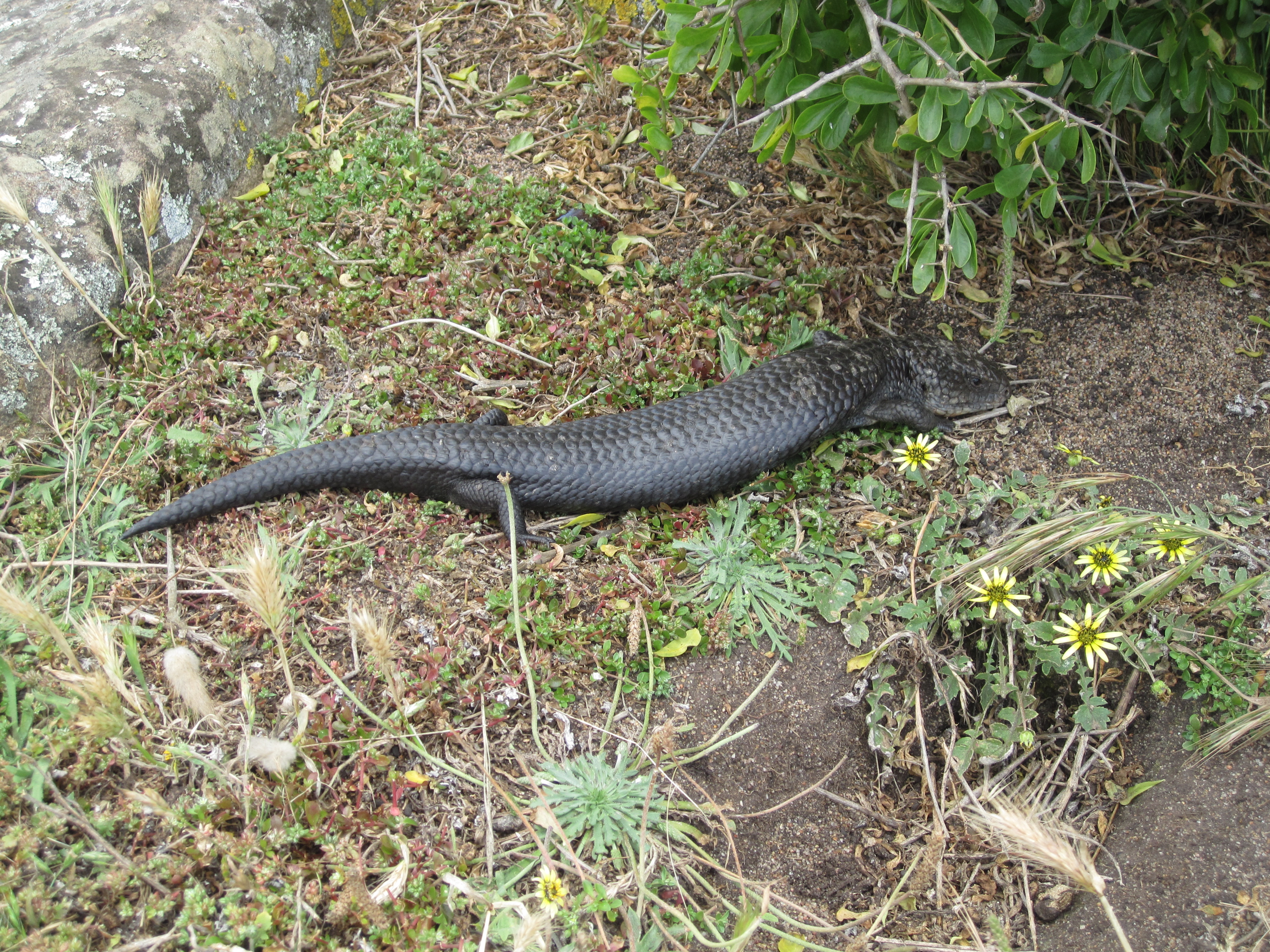
Melanistic morph, Low Head, Tasmania

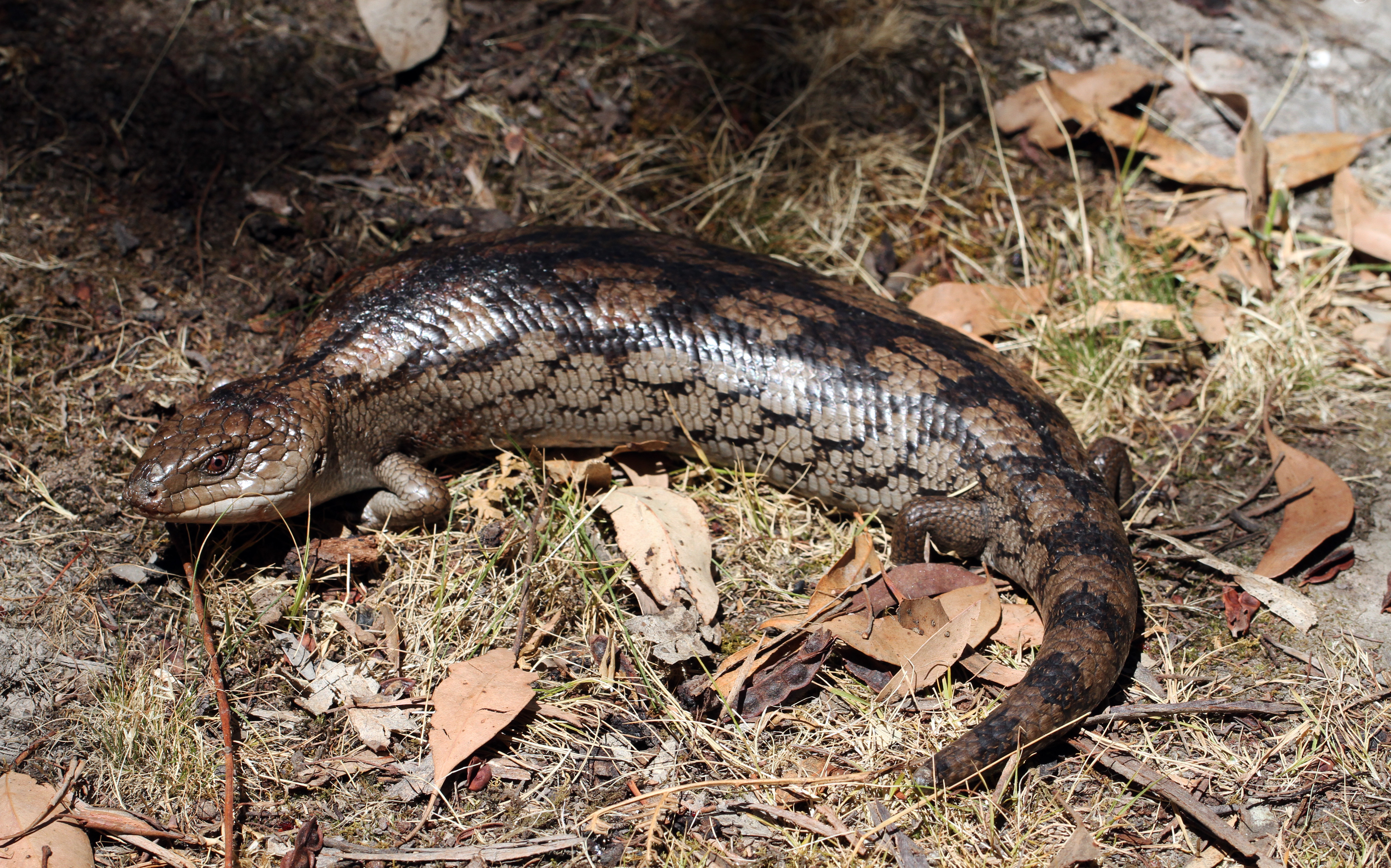
Gravid female
