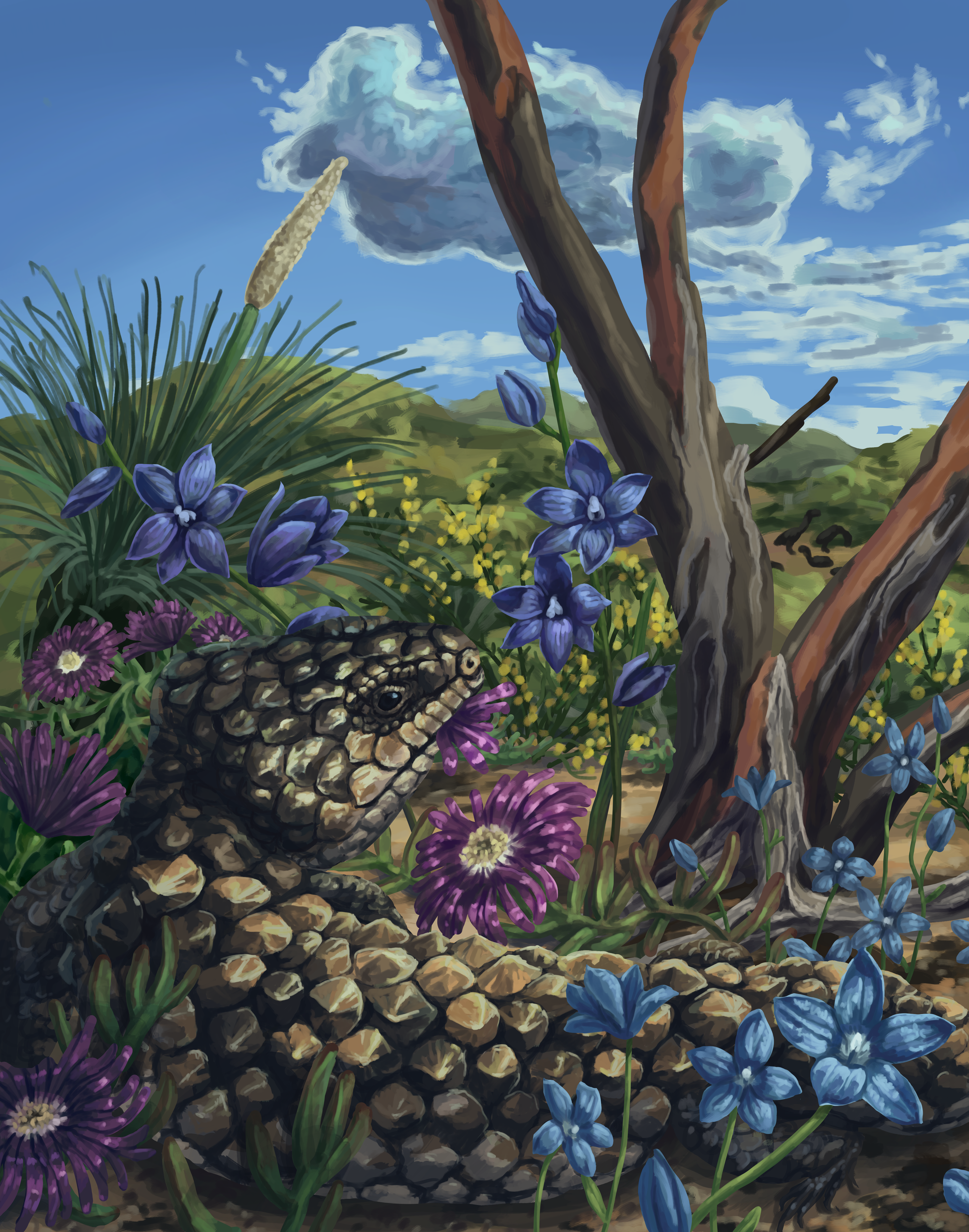
- Tiliqua frangens in scrubland

Scientific classification
- Kingdom: Animalia
- Phylum: Chordata
- Class: Reptilia
- Order: Squamata
- Family: Scincidae
- Subfamily: Egerniinae
- Genus: Tiliqua
- Species: T. frangens

Binomial name
- Tiliqua frangens (Hutchinson and Scanlon, 2009)

Synonyms
- Aethesia frangens Hutchinson and Scanlon, 2009; Tiliqua laticephala? Čerňanský and Hutchinson, 2013

= Tiliqua frangens =

Tiliqua frangens Temporal range: Pliocene-Pleistocene 5.3333–0.04716 Ma

Extinct species of lizards

Tiliqua frangens is an extinct species of the extant genus Tiliqua, blue-tongued skinks. It lived during the Pliocene and Pleistocene epoch from New South Wales in Australia.

== Discovery ==
In 2009, the holotype, known from early Pliocene to early Pleistocene rocks from the Wellington Caves of New South Wales in Australia, consisted of the anterior portion of the left mandible, from the symphysis to the splenial bone and containing portions of the coronoid. Hutchinson and Scanlon named the species Aethesia frangens: the generic name was based on the Greek word ἀήθως (aëthes), meaning 'odd' or 'unusual', while the specific name, meaning 'breaking into pieces' or 'smashing,' is based on the possible effect of its large jaws. Teeth number 9 to 15 are intact, with the eighth being a partial tooth and none of the other remaining past the mandible. The teeth slightly enlarge from anterior to posterior.

In 2013, Čerňanský and Hutchinson described a new species of blue-tongued skink, T. laticephala, from Pliocene rocks of the same location where A. frangens was discovered; the specific name is a portmanteau of Latin word latus which means 'broad' and Greek word kephalē (κεφαλή) which means 'head'. In 2023, Thorn and colleagues renamed A. frangens as T. frangens, with phylogenetic analyses suggesting it to be most closely related to the modern shingleback, and claimed that T. laticephala possibly represents the same taxon with peramorphic traits. They also reported new specimens of this species, including the neonate specimen and the late Pleistocene material also discovered from Wellington Caves.

== Description ==
T. frangens is the largest known skink, measuring nearly 60 cm (2.0 ft) long from snout to vent and weighing approximately 2.4 kg (5.3 lb). Although the skull that measured 7 cm (2.8 in) long isn't significantly larger in comparison to other species of Tiliqua, it is much more robust, broad and deep with a shorter muzzle. It also had a Meckelian groove and a pattern of tooth replacement consistent with modern skinks.
