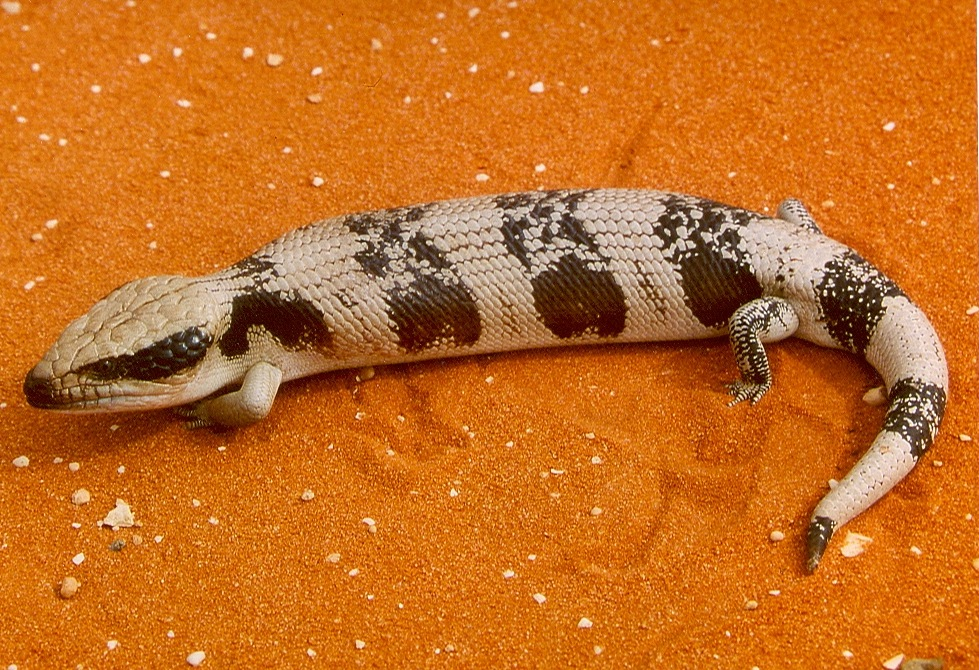

Conservation status
- Least Concern (IUCN 3.1)

Scientific classification
- Kingdom: Animalia
- Phylum: Chordata
- Class: Reptilia
- Order: Squamata
- Family: Scincidae
- Genus: Tiliqua
- Species: T. occipitalis

Binomial name
- Tiliqua occipitalis (Peters, 1863)
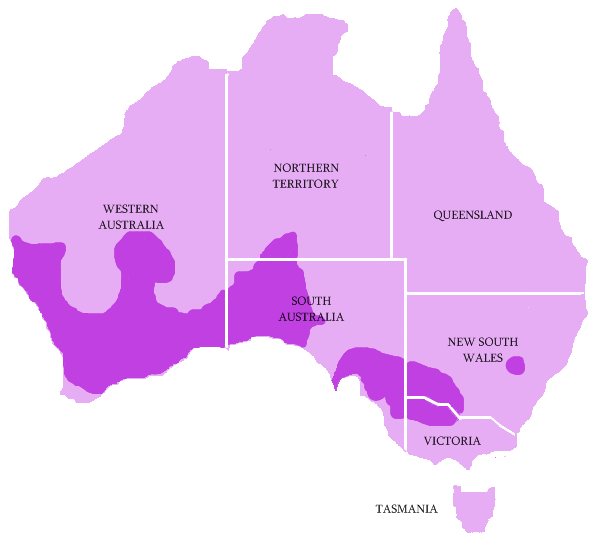
- Range indicated by darker shading

= Western blue-tongued lizard =

Species of lizard

The western blue-tongued lizard (Tiliqua occipitalis), also known as the western blue-tongued skink, is a large skink native to Australia. It is one of six species of blue-tongued skinks found in Australia, though further species are found in New Guinea and Indonesia.

The western blue-tongued lizard grows to around 45 cm (18 in) in length. It has a brown, banded pattern across the body and tail; the underside of the body is usually pale. It has distinctive black markings to the rear of each eye. The body is wide and large in comparison to the size of the legs. As its name suggests, it has a blue tongue, which contrasts with the pink interior of its mouth. When threatened, it may open its mouth and stick out its tongue in a threat display. If the initial display is unsuccessful, and the predator or threat does not retreat, it may hiss and flatten out its body in an attempt to make itself look bigger. ...

It is diurnal, hunting for insects, spiders, and snails, and foraging for plants (particularly berries) and carrion. It is not an agile lizard, so its prey tends to be slow-moving. It has powerful jaws which allow it break up snail shells and the exoskeletons of beetles. It is found in grasslands, dunes, shrublands, and sparse woodlands. It rests under leaf litter or rocks at night, and sometimes uses abandoned rabbit burrows for shelter. Blue-tongued lizards are popular pets and can live for up to 30 years in captivity, though the western blue-tongued lizard is extremely uncommon as a pet, as it is one of the rarer species.

They give birth to approximately 5 live young. The young consume the placental membrane immediately after birth, and are precocious and disperse after a few days. They have bands of yellow and brown on their bodies and tails.

The western blue-tongued lizard is found chiefly in Western Australia. It is restricted to the far south in the Northern Territory, and divided into an eastern and western population in South Australia. It is listed as "Near Threatened" in Victoria, where it is restricted to the north, and "Threatened" in New South Wales, where it exists as a population to the southwest and in a pocket in the centre of the state. Threats to the species include predation by introduced species such as the red fox and domestic cat, clearance of habitat for agriculture, and destruction of the rabbit warrens used for shelter.

== Relatives ==
The western blue tongued lizard is related to the Tiliqua scincoides scincoides, or the eastern blue tongued skink

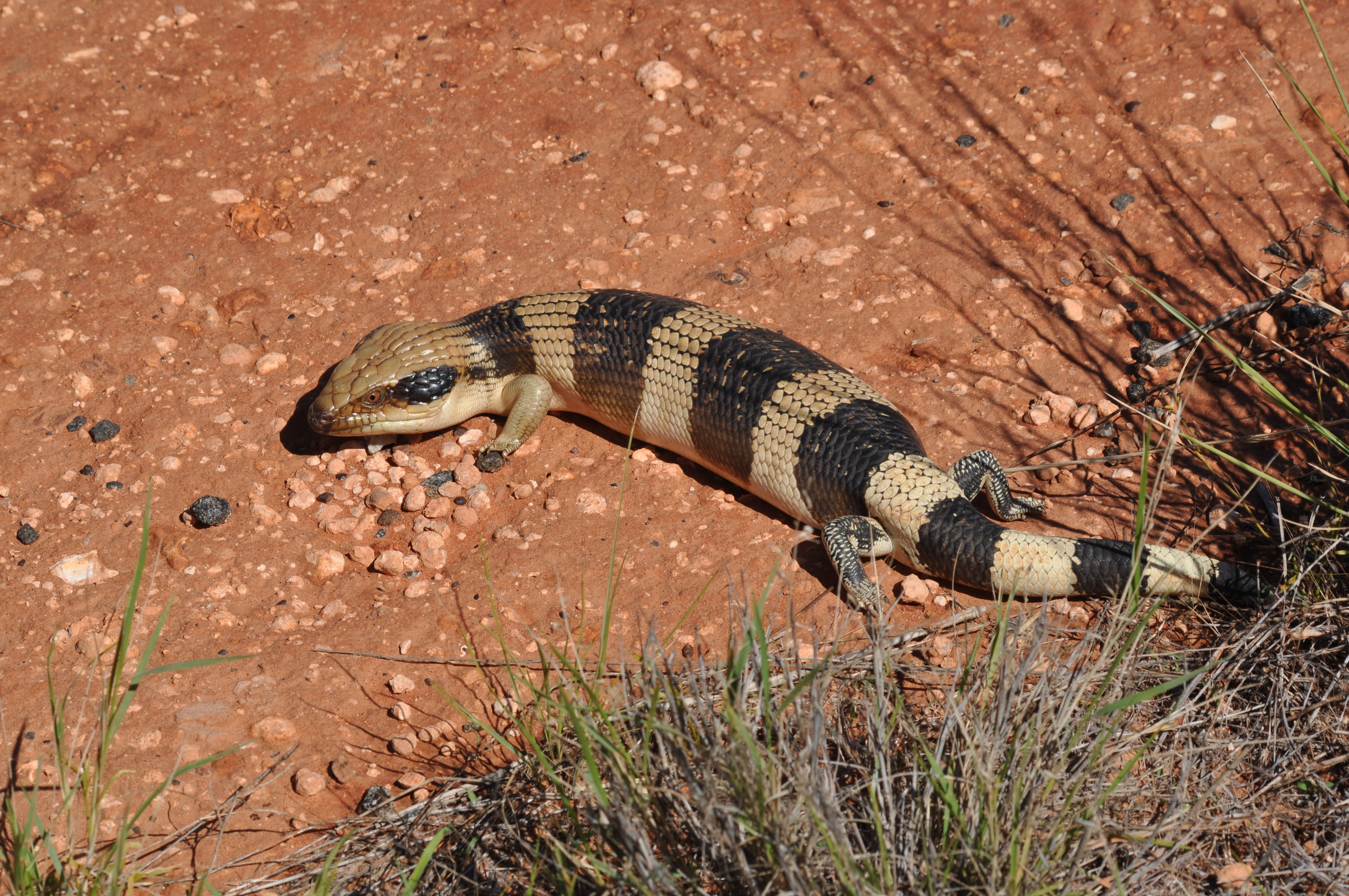
Western Blue-tongued Lizard (Tiliqua occipitalis)
