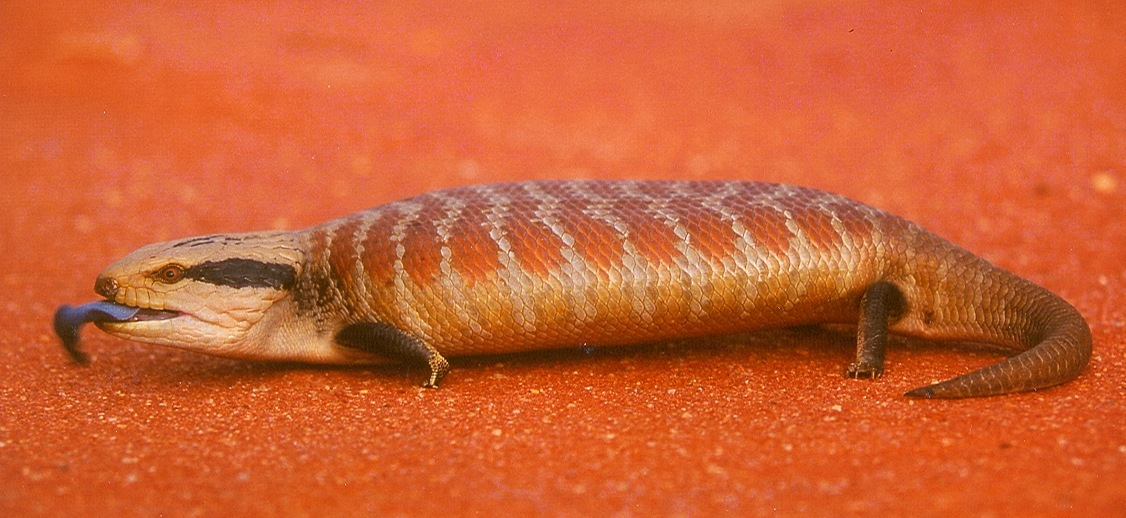

Conservation status
- Least Concern (IUCN 3.1)

Scientific classification
- Kingdom: Animalia
- Phylum: Chordata
- Class: Reptilia
- Order: Squamata
- Suborder: Scinciformata
- Infraorder: Scincomorpha
- Family: Egerniidae
- Genus: Tiliqua
- Species: T. multifasciata

Binomial name
- Tiliqua multifasciata Sternfeld, 1919

= Centralian blue-tongued skink =

Species of lizard

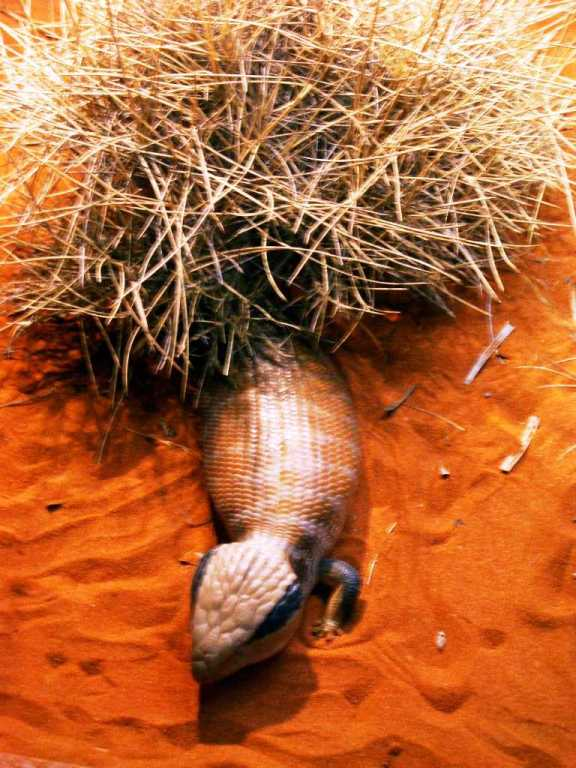
Centralian blue-tongued skink. Near Uluru, NT. 2005

The Centralian blue-tongued skink or Centralian blue-tongue (Tiliqua multifasciata) is a species of skink, occurring predominantly in the far north-west corner of New South Wales, Australia. It is one of six species belonging to the genus Tiliqua; the blue-tongued skinks and the shinglebacks. This species of reptile classifies as a lizard.

== Description ==
The Centralian blue-tongue is of a very robust build, short body and slender tail, and is among the largest 1% of species in the family Scincidae. Both the forelimb and hindlimb have five digits.

=== Colouring ===
The skink is predominantly pale brown to grey in colour with a series of nine or more orange-brown bands along the length of the body and tail. These darker coloured bands are much wider than the paler grey-brown interspaces but are at their narrowest along the mid-dorsal region of the skink. There is a distinguishing black stripe surrounding the eye and extending to just above the ear, and upper-hind areas of limbs are also black. The skink is pale cream to white on the underside.

== Distribution ==
The geographical distribution of the blue-tongued skink lies throughout the far north-west corner of New South Wales and South Australia, and centrally throughout Western Australia, the Northern Territory and Queensland. In general, habitats include a variety of arid and semi-arid stony and red sandy spinifex vegetated areas.

== Behaviour ==
Like many other reptilian species, the blue-tongued is a fairly sedentary terrestrial creature. It is a ground-dwelling, diurnal species and displacements are relatively short (less than 20 metres) and on average the total distance travelled each day can fall between 122 and 245 metres.

== Diet ==
Analyses of stomach contents have shown that the blue-tongue feeds on a combination of seeds, insects, livestock dung and some vertebrate and invertebrate material such as that of bird or other reptilian remains (i.e. fragments of bone, loose feathers).

== Reproduction ==
Along with the other five species of the same genus, the Centralian blue-tongued skink is a viviparous species – it bears between two and 10 live young in a single litter.

== Threats ==
The geographical location of the skink sees one of its major threats to be ingestion of the invasive and toxic cane toad, but it is also under pressures from other anthropogenic processes such as fire and habitat fragmentation. However, the species is still currently listed as least concern.
