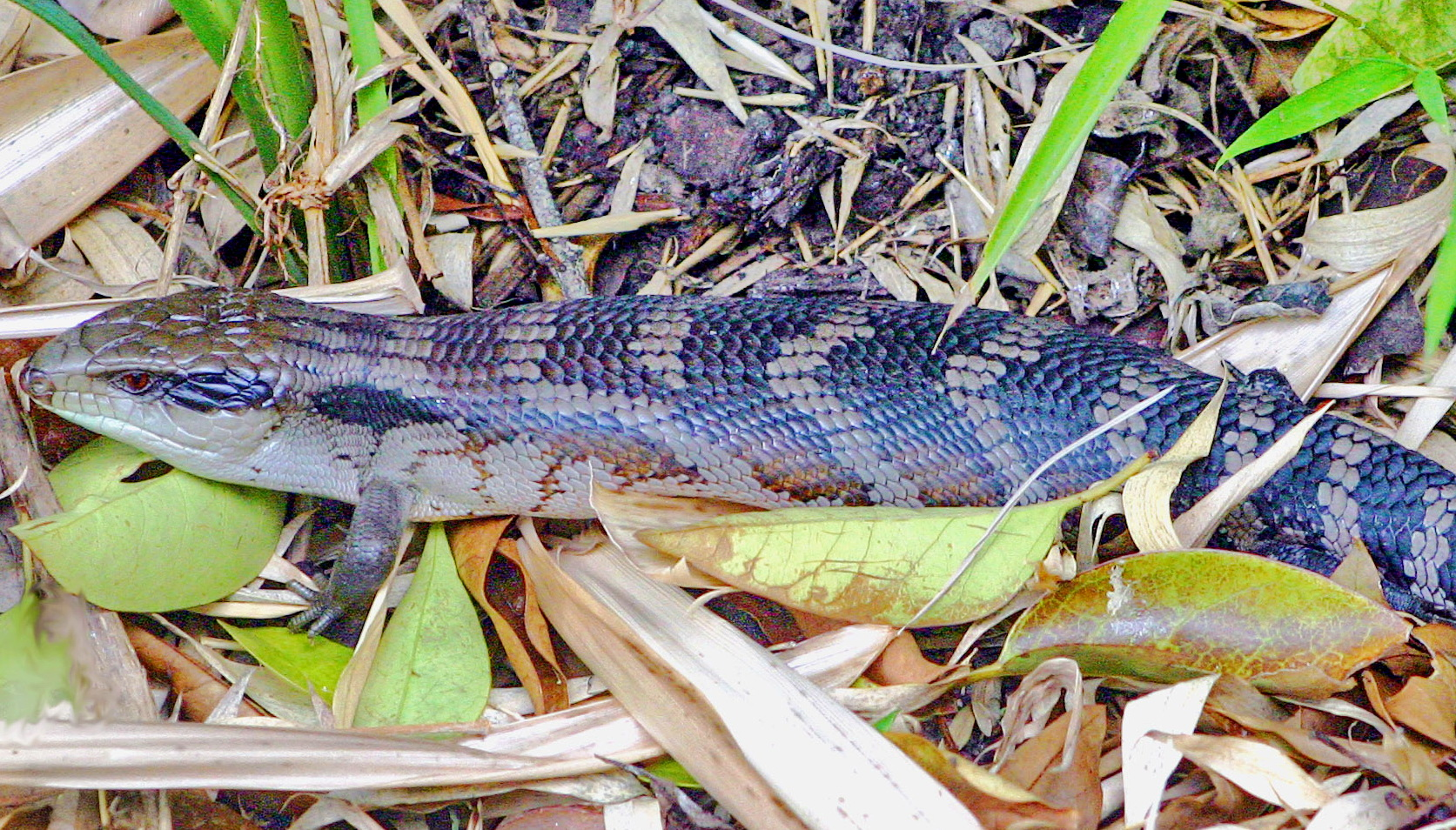

Conservation status
- Least Concern (IUCN 3.1)

Scientific classification
- Kingdom: Animalia
- Phylum: Chordata
- Class: Reptilia
- Order: Squamata
- Family: Scincidae
- Genus: Tiliqua
- Species: T. scincoides
- Subspecies: T. s. scincoides

Trinomial name
- Tiliqua scincoides scincoides (White, 1790)

= Eastern blue-tongued skink =

Species of reptile native to Australia

The eastern blue-tongued skink (Tiliqua scincoides scincoides), or eastern blue-tongued lizard, is a species of skink native to the east coast of Australia. Its blue tongue can be used to warn off predators. In addition to flashing its blue tongue, the skink hisses and puffs up its chest to assert dominance and appear bigger when in the presence of its predators such as large snakes and birds. The eastern blue tongue is ovoviviparous and precocial, meaning that its young are more developed and advanced at their time of birth. Tiliqua scincoides scincoides is not venomous or poisonous to humans and can be found in suburban and urban areas, specifically in house gardens.

== Nomenclature ==
The eastern blue-tongued skink (Tiliqua scincoides scincoides) is a species of skink in the genus Tiliqua. It is a subspecies of the common blue-tongued skink, and it is also called the eastern blue-tongued lizard, or the eastern bluetongue for short. Tiliqua scincoides scincoides is in the Animalia kingdom, the Chordata phylum, the Reptilia class, the Squamata order, the Scincidae family, the Tiliqua genus, the T. scincoides species, and the T. s. scincoides subspecies.

== Appearance ==
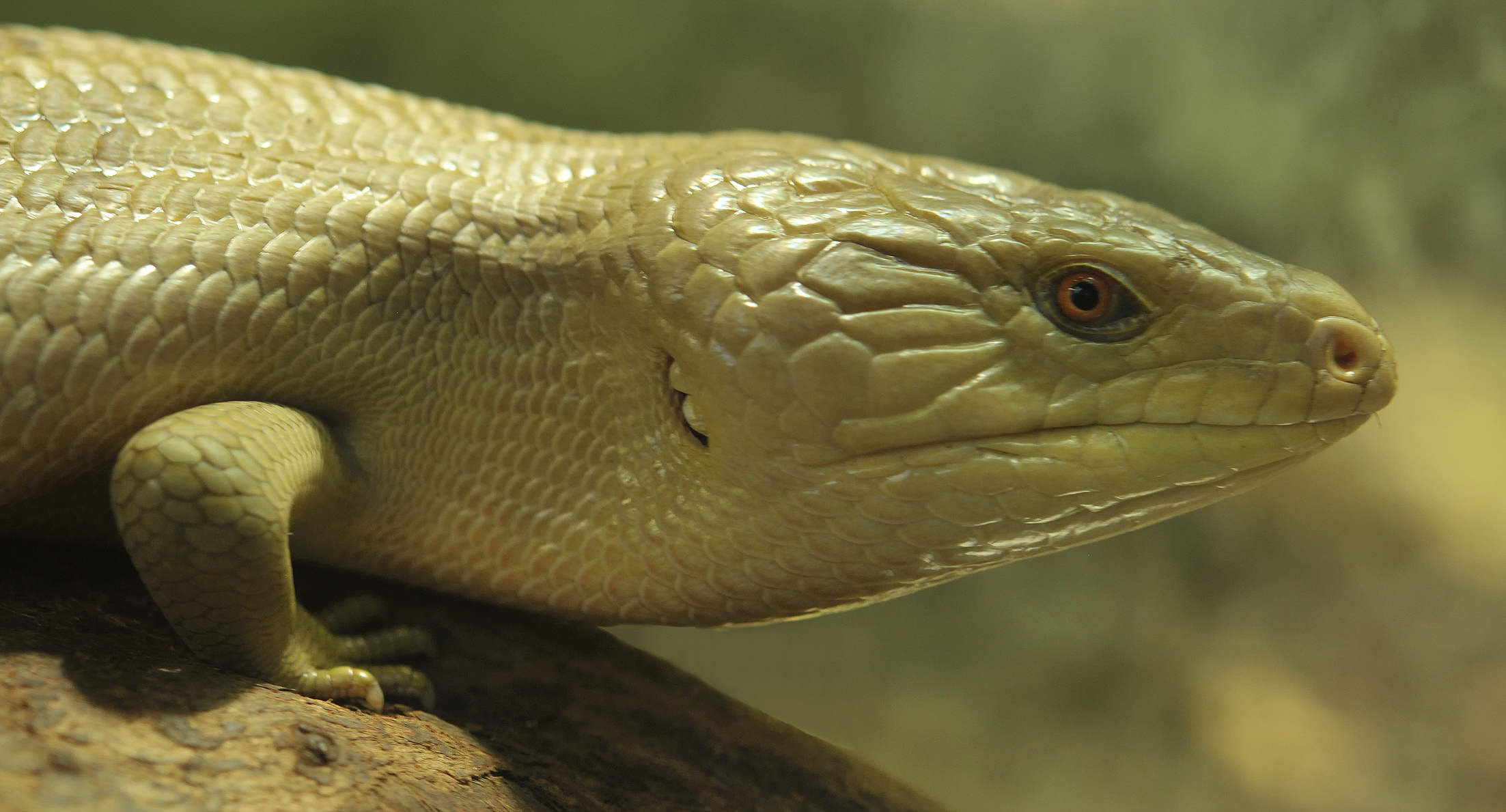
Eastern blue-tongued skink in the Leipzig Zoological Garden, Leipzig, Germany

The eastern blue-tongued skink has a short body and short legs. This lizard weighs approximately 1 kilogram and extends approximately 60 centimeters. 36 cm of the 60 cm are the lizards' head and body. The snout-vent length is 300-320mm and the hind limb length makes up 20% of snout-vent length. The skinks have tails that are short and robust. In other words, the length of the hind legs is roughly 62 mm while the tail length is approximately 195mm and makes up 50-75% of the snout-vent length.

The lizard can have different colors, but its pattern frequently appears to be banded. The tongue of the lizard is a blue color and can appear to have a hint of violet. This blue tongue is used to alarm predators and scare them off. The eastern blue-tongued lizard has smooth skin covered with scales that overlap and have small bone plates. The ventral (abdominal) region of the lizard is a silver or gray color. The lizard's back, however, appears dark brown and cream-colored and its head is pale brown. Across its body, the eastern blue-tongued skink has broad black and brown bands. This lizard can generally be identified by the black stripe that extends from its eye to the tympanum (exposed eardrum), and sometimes all the way to the side of the neck. Their blue tongues could be an evolutionary adaptation that assists in long-distance communication in order to warn off predators and decrease aggressive activity.

== Habitat ==
T. s. scincoides are found in the coastal plain and lower Blue Mountains near Sydney, Australia and in the majority of New South Wales. Eastern blue-tongues frequent open country and take shelter among large objects on the ground like logs or rocks or among leaf litter. Blue-tongued skinks are incapable of producing their own body heat, as are all lizards. Because of this, they spend their mornings in the sun before looking for food in order to maintain their body temperature, which is between 30 and 35 degrees Celsius when they are active. In the winter, however, when the weather is cold, lizards bury themselves in their shelter sites and are not active. These lizards only leave their shelters on days when the sun is out, so that they can bask in the sun. They infrequently leave the comfort of their hollow logs and ground debris.

=== Temperature regulation ===
T. s. scincoides are behaviorally regulated by their internal temperature, which is a direct result of the peripheral temperature and the temperature of their brains. In a study done in 1969, the behavior of this species was observed between warm and cold environments. The results of this study suggested that when the lizards were inactive, they chose to move to a place that was cooler, therefore causing their internal temperatures to decrease. When their internal temperatures reached a reproducible level when in heat, they decided to return to a more neutral environment. It has also been found that juvenile lizards utilize higher environmental temperatures and thermo-regulate more often than adult lizards.

=== Conservation status ===
Eastern blue-tongued skinks may eat poisonous snails and slugs that have been tainted by snail baits. If these lizards are living in a garden, they may be exposed to snail baits and insecticides that can cause them harm. Because blue-tongued skinks are able to squirm through small holes in and under fences, they may be faced with garden pests or chemicals used by neighbours. When these lizards are kept as pets, they often are attracted to horizontal pipes, cavities under houses, and rockeries as hiding sites. T. s. scincoides show signs of having a stable population, whereas its sister subspecies, the northern blue-tongued skink (T. s. intermedia), appears to have a declining population. In Australia, there has been a ban on exportation and trading of reptiles. Although it is prohibited to do so, the blue tongue is a very popular lizard to trade due its unique tongue color.

Cane toads (Rhinella marina) have become an invasive species in Australia which affect all native predators, including blue-tongued skinks. These lizards are killed by these toxic toads, thus affecting their population.

According to a consensus published in 2017 by the San Diego Zoo Wildlife Alliance Library, the eastern blue-tongued skink has a wide distribution and it is categorized as "least concern" in terms of endangerment. Regardless of their stable population, these lizards are protected in Australia as a native species. Government regulations like the Environment Protection and Biodiversity Conservation Act in 1999 have positively influenced the preservation of the eastern blue-tongued skink.

== Close relatives ==
This species is closely related to two other subspecies, the northern blue-tongued skink (T. s. intermedia) and the Tanimbar blue-tongued skink (T. s. chimaerea). However, they have different habitats. T. s. scincoides is native to southern and eastern Australia, T. s. intermedia is native to northern Australia, and T. s. chimaerea is native to the Maluku Province in Indonesia. The eastern blue-tongued skink can be found in mixed woodland habitats, semi-deserts, and scrubland areas in Tasmania and mainland Australia. They can also be found habituating in terrestrial biomes, such as scrub forests, grasslands, or savanna.

== Diet ==
As an omnivore, the blue-tongued skink has a diet that consists of plants, fruits, insects, and other reptiles. Captive studies have been conducted and have shown that high quality dog food is one of the best food sources for these lizards as it contains extra minerals and vitamins. These lizards eat during the day and have been labeled as diurnal. Because eastern blue-tongued lizards are not agile, they frequently consume animals that move more slowly. Typically, they tend to munch on snail shells and beetles. They are able to do so because their jaw muscles are strong and their teeth are large. When feeding, the lizard will use their extensive, wet adhesion tongue to capture the prey (also called lingual prey capture), similar to Iguania, before transporting it into their mouths. These lizards also eat crickets and wax worms.

== Reproductive cycle and parental care ==
The eastern blue tongue becomes sexually mature between 561 and 590 days. T. s. scincoides is reported to be ovoviviparous, which means eastern blue tongue embryos develop inside eggs that are retained within the mother's body until they are hatched. Since baby lizards are born in this mode, there is no risk of predators stealing the eggs. On average, each female has about 10 offspring and due to this process, the offspring all have an elevated level of survival. Female lizards give birth to 6-20 young per year. Similar to other animals, these offspring are nourished by the primitive placenta.

T. s. scincoides are precocial species, meaning that they are born at a more advanced developmental stage and therefore do not require as much parental care because their brain is mostly developed at the time of their birth, unlike altricial species. A study done on these lizards found that adults and juveniles are able to distinguish between color and shape stimuli successfully. This study highlights the idea that T. s. scincoides are behaviorally flexible and adaptable in both adulthood and youth, specifically in reversal learning. These results, however, did not support the formation of an attentional set.

Interestingly, research has shown that sexual maturity occurs at different body sizes depending on the location where a male T. s. scincoides resides. For example, it was found that sexual maturity happens at smaller body sizes in the southern part of Australia than in Queensland.

== Lifespan ==
In captivity, the eastern blue-tongued skink can live in excess of 20 years.

== Predators and parasites ==
=== Reptile ticks ===
Blue tongued lizards can be attacked by reptile ticks which attach under their scales or inside the ear canal. These ticks do not cause paralysis and do not latch onto mammals, only onto reptiles. Other than ticks, mites and worms are also parasites to the eastern blue-tongued skink.

=== Other predators ===
Blue tongues fall prey to large snakes and large predatory birds. The large snakes include the mulga snake (Pseudechis australis), the red-bellied black snake, the black-headed python (Aspidites malanocephalus), and the eastern brown snake. The large predatory birds include the laughing kookaburras and brown falcons. Eastern blue-tongued skinks also get eaten by feral dogs and cats. Other predators of the eastern blue tongue include goannas, dingoes, and domestic cats and dogs.

== Behaviour and physiology ==
T. s. scincoides show very little aggression and are said to be docile and shy. The eastern blue-tongued skink uses deimatic display with its blue tongue in order to scare off potential predators. When predators approach the lizard, it opens its mouth and sticks out its blue tongue, stretching it to its full size, warning them off by showing that it may be distasteful. The lizards also hiss, inflate and lunge, which may evoke fear in any potential predator.

Many methods have been explored in order to best categorize lizards as male or female. Lizard sex can be determined non-invasively by measuring head width, snout-vent length, weight, and trunk length. Specifically, ratios of head width to snout-vent length and head width to trunk length can be calculated to determine the sex of the eastern blue-tongued skink.

Studies have shown that reptiles are capable of displaying human-like feelings, such as anxiety and pleasure, among other emotions.

=== Protective coloration ===
It has been hypothesized that the coloration and behaviour of the T. s. scincoides evolved in order to mimic the death adder, which is a venomous snake that shares some characteristics with the lizard. The death adders that live in the same area as T. s. scincoides have very similar coloration and patterning, with alternating bands of light grey and dark brown. Additionally, since this type of lizard has very short legs, it does look very similar to a snake, and its large head matches the size and shape of a death adder's. T. s. scincoides hisses loudly and puffs up its chest to appear larger and assert dominance. This lizard species can also lose its tail during a quarrel and regrow it. It typically takes a year for their tail to regrow. In terms of breeding, T. s. scincoides spend most of their time alone. However, September, October and November are mating months. These months are marked by fights between males in order to attain their first choice female. More research needs to be done on whether the skink's blue tongue is a result of an adaptation that is anti-predatory or if it serves as infraspecific communication. However, studies have supported the idea that the amount of melanin present in the skink's skin does not strongly affect tongue coloration. Another interesting finding is that blue-colored tongues have similar chromatic qualities to UV blue skin patches and can be reflective. Another finding from this 2015 study is that "UV blue tongues are more conspicuous than pink tongues, especially in the visual model of conspecifics".

=== Olfaction ===
The eastern blue-tongued skink has an olfactory epithelium that appears to be of the pseudo-stratified type and is loosely packed. The underlying Bowman glands and other supporting cells secrete to the olfactory epithelium's surface, which has cilia from sensory cells and microvilli from supporting cells.

=== Venom ===
T. s. scincoides are not venomous or deadly to humans. Bites from this skink will cause pain and leave a bruise; however, they will not cause any long-term effects.

== Interactions with humans and livestock ==
The eastern blue tongue can adapt to suburban living. The skink can be found in gardens or basking in the sun on roads or drain pipes. As T. s. scincoides can live in urban areas, it can face injury from house pets, such as cats and dogs, be hit by cars, or harmed by gardening tools.

== Gallery ==
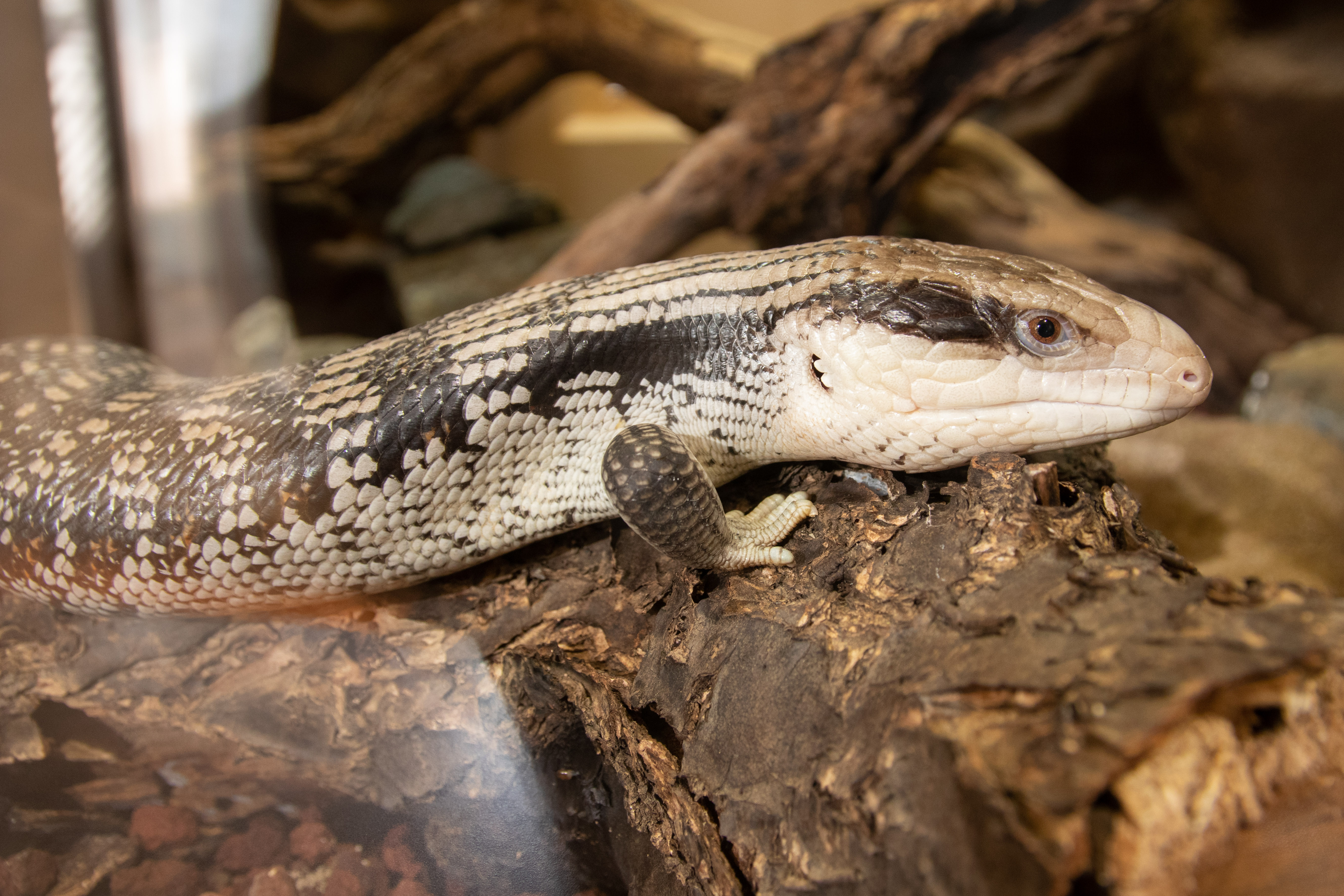
Eastern blue-tongued skink

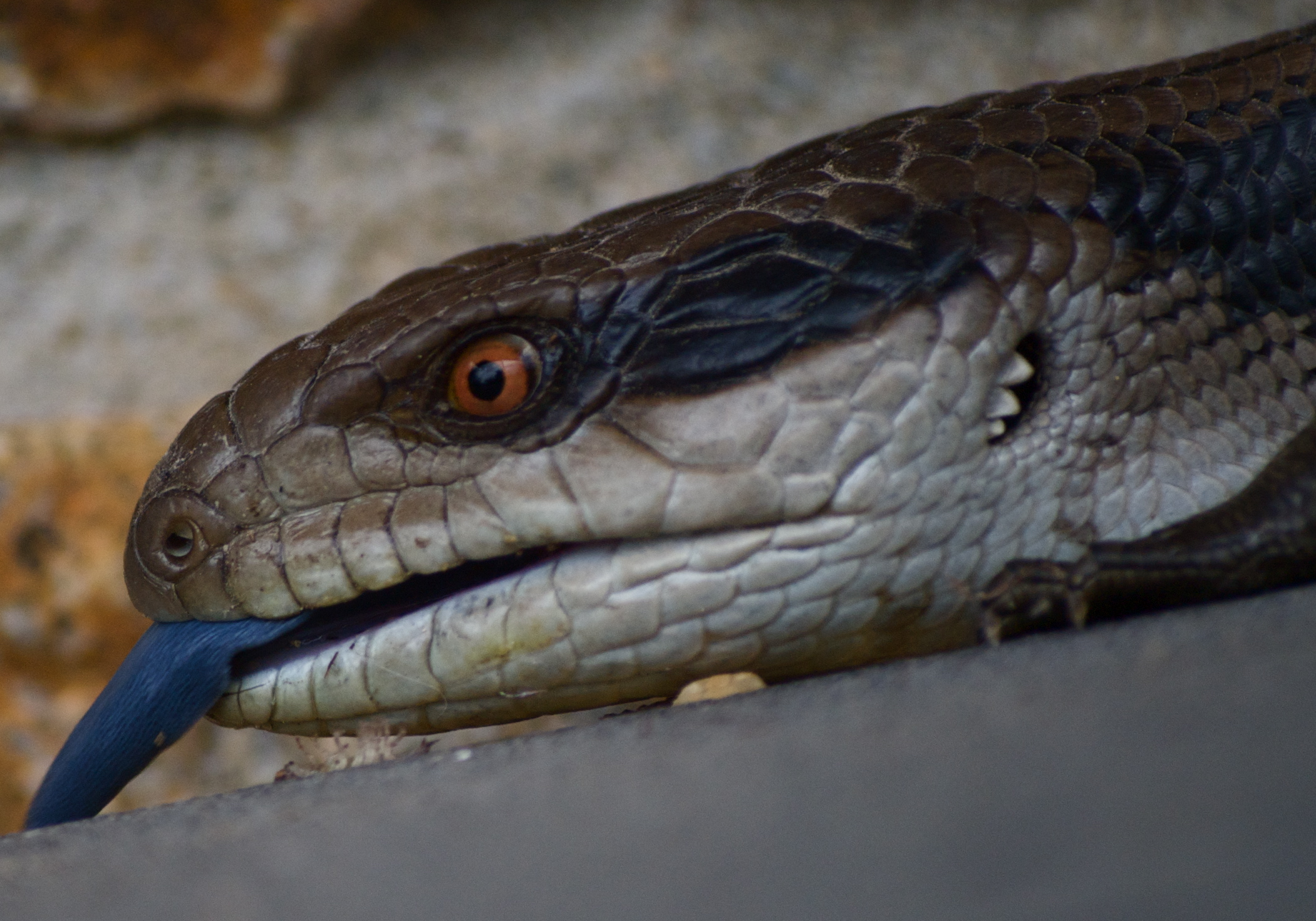

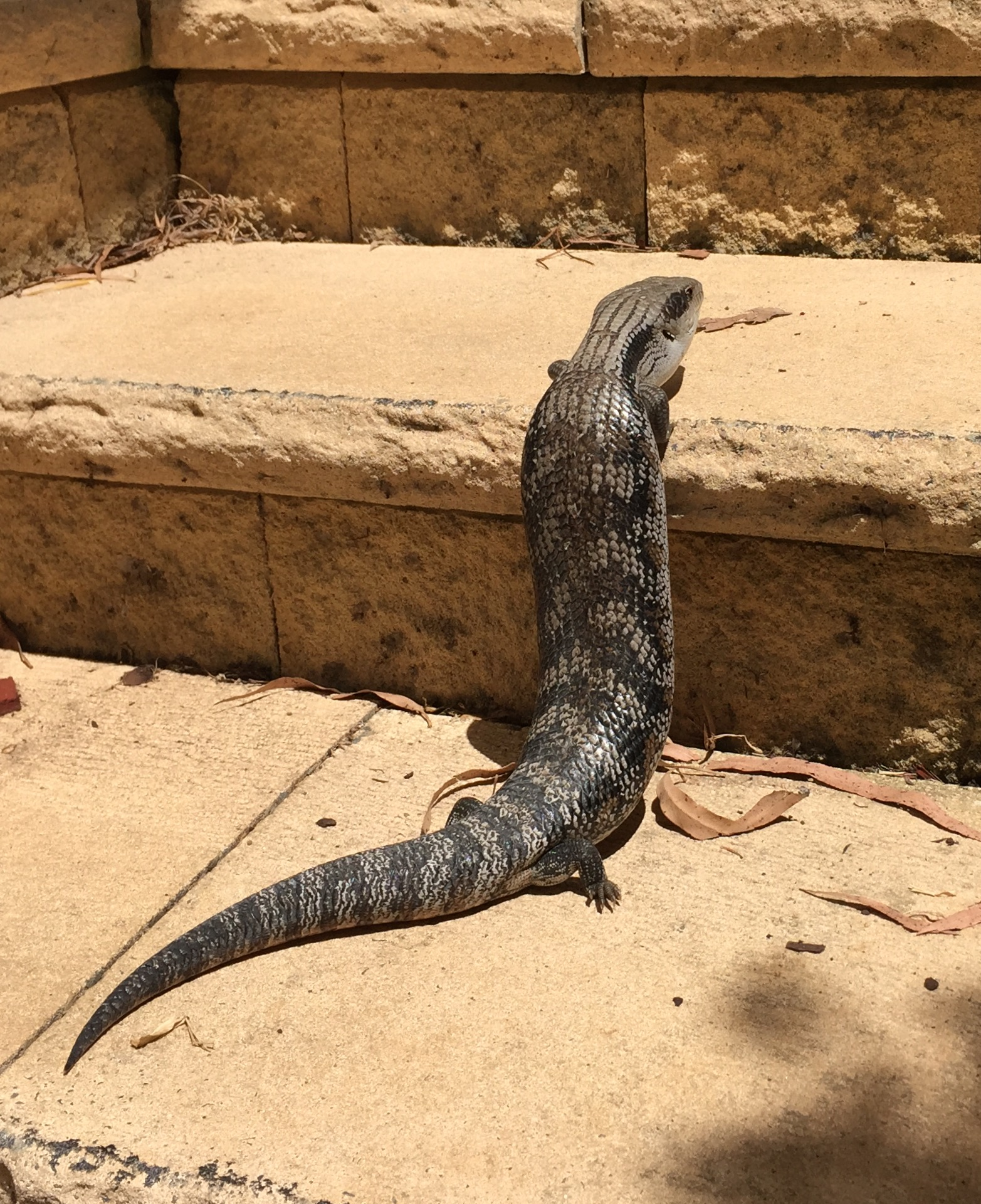

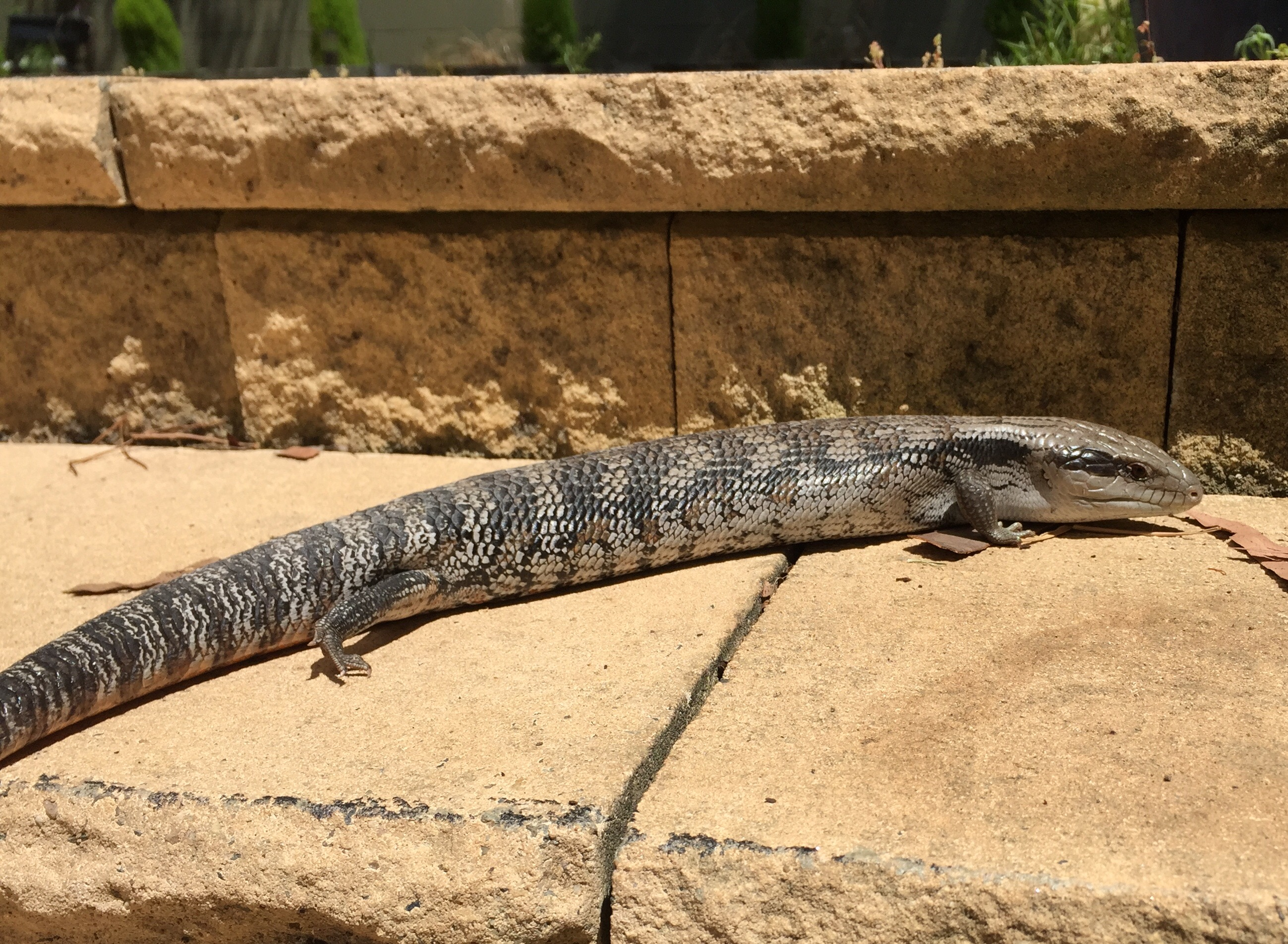

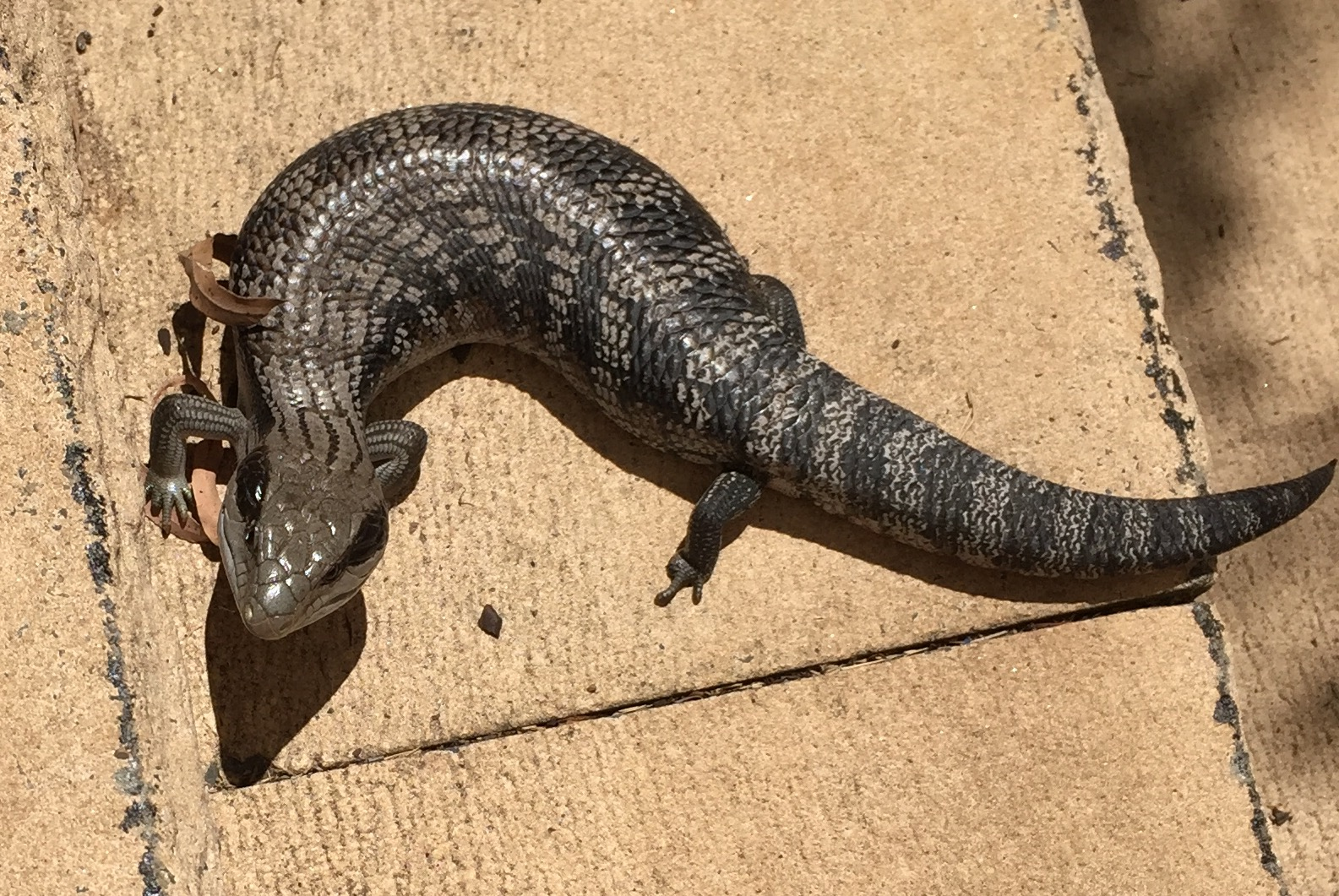

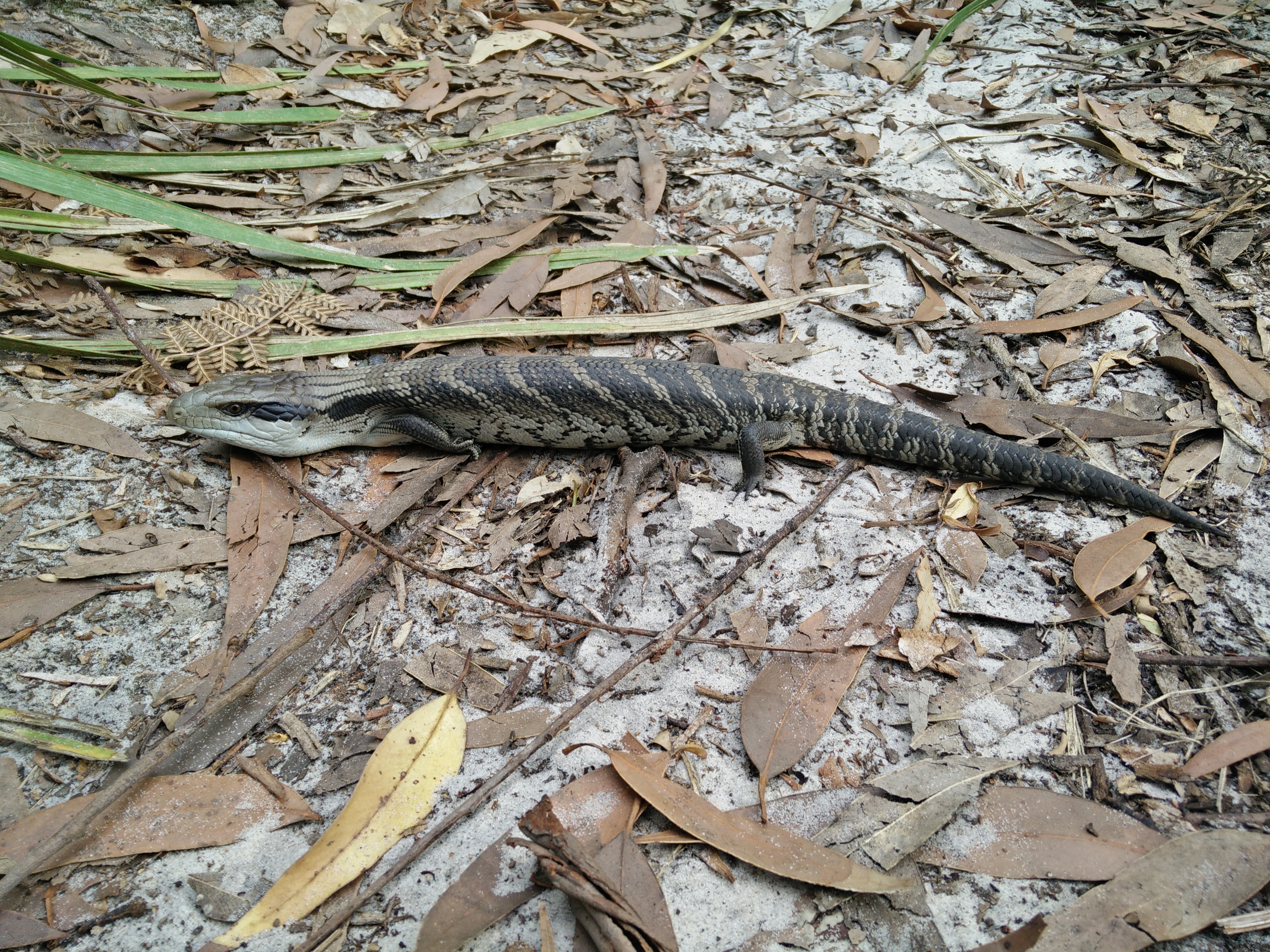

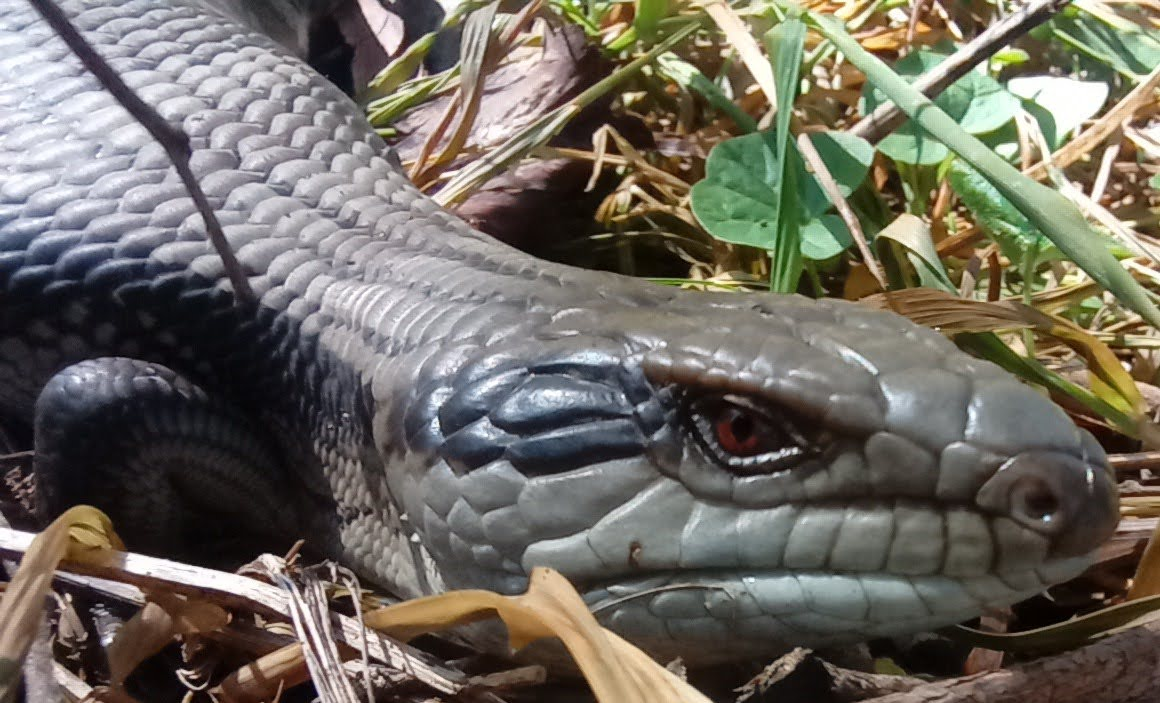

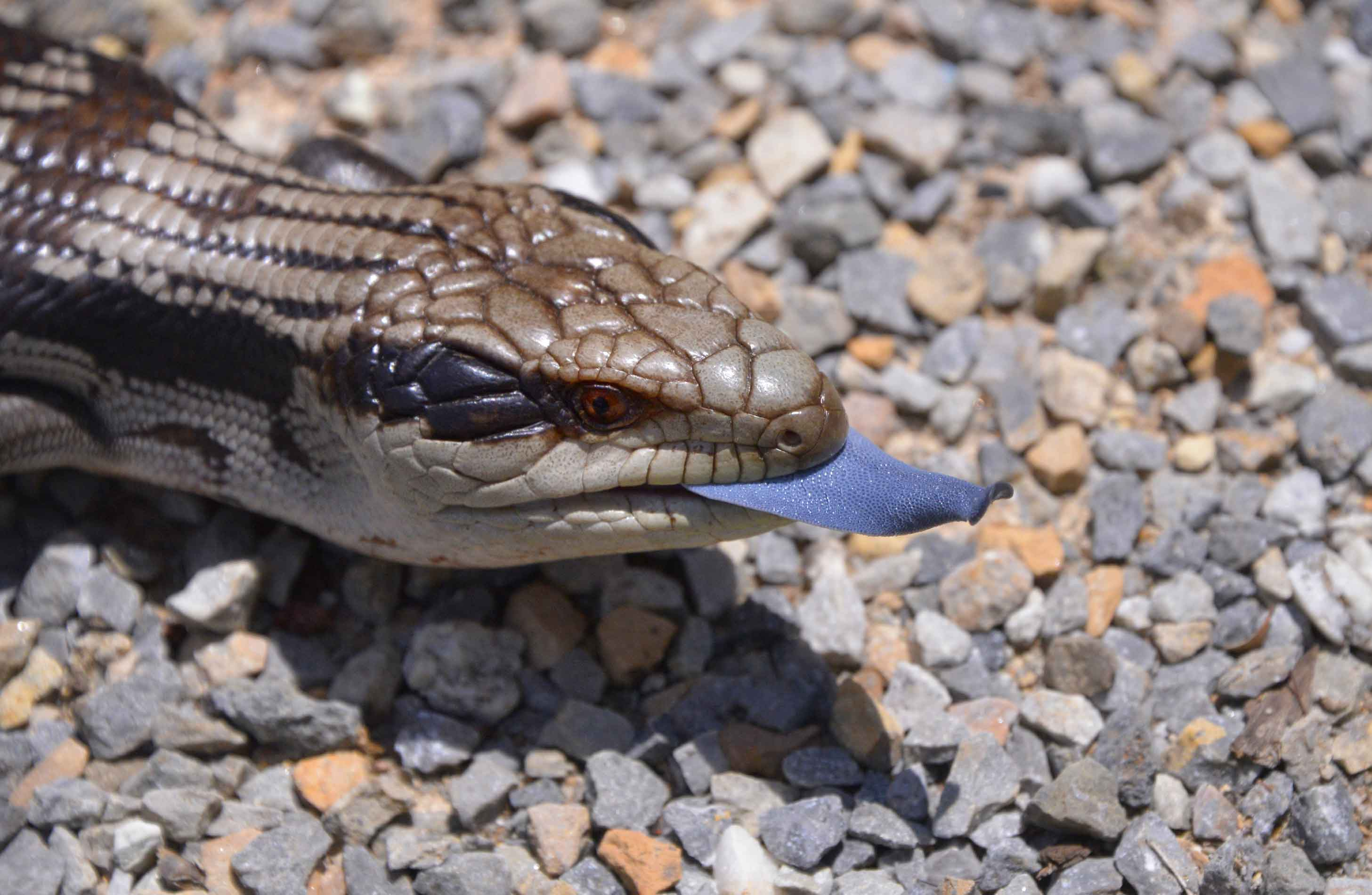

== Sources ==
- Szabo, Birgit; Noble, Daniel W. A.; Byrne, Richard W.; Tait, David S.; Whiting, Martin J. (1 August 2019). "Precocial juvenile lizards show adult level learning and behavioural flexibility". Animal Behaviour. 154: 75–84. doi:10.1016/j.anbehav.2019.06.003. hdl:10023/20233. S2CID 195887199.
- Abbey, Don (2000). "Tiliqua scincoides (Common Bluetongue, Eastern Bluetongue, Northern Bluetongue, Eastern Blue-Tongued Lizard)". Animal Diversity Web.
- "Eastern Blue-tongue Lizard". The Australian Museum. 2000.
- Myhre, K.; Hammel, H. T. (November 1969). "Behavioral regulation of internal temperature in the lizard Tiliqua scincoides". American Journal of Physiology. Legacy Content. 217 (5): 1490–1495. doi:10.1152/ajplegacy.1969.217.5.1490.
- Kratzing, Jean E. (1 February 1975). "The fine structure of the olfactory and vomeronasal organs of a lizard (Tiliqua scincoides scincoides)". Cell and Tissue Research. 156 (2): 239–252. doi:10.1007/BF00221807. PMID 1122519. S2CID 2091087.
- Tiliqua scincoides at the Reptarium.cz Reptile Database
- "Australian blue-tongued skink" (PDF). Potter Park Zoo. March 2017.
- Jirik, Kate (9 March 2021). "Eastern Blue-tongued Skink (Tiliqua scincoides) Fact Sheet: Behavior & Ecology". San Diego Zoo Wildlife Alliance Library.
