= List of zoos in Australia =

This is an accurate list of zoos in Australia. For aquariums, see List of aquaria in Australia.

Zoos are primarily facilities where animals are displayed to the public, and in which they may also be bred. Such facilities include zoos, safari parks, animal theme parks, aviaries, butterfly zoos, and reptile centres, as well as wildlife sanctuaries and nature reserves where visitors are allowed.

== Australian Capital Territory ==
- Canberra Reptile Zoo, Nicholls
- Canberra Walk in Aviary, Nicholls
- National Zoo & Aquarium, Yarralumla

== New South Wales ==
- Altina Wildlife Park, Darlington Point
- Auburn Botanic Gardens, Auburn
- Aussie Ark/Devil Ark, Tomalla
- Australia Walkabout Wildlife Park, Calga, Central Coast
- Australian Wildlife Sanctuary, Bargo
- Australian Reptile Park, Somersby
- Banana Cabana Primate Sanctuary, Dural
- Billabong Koala and Wildlife Park, Port Macquarie
- Blackbutt Reserve, Kotara
- Byron Bay Wildlife Sanctuary, Tintenbar (formerly Macadamia Castle)
- Calmsley City Farm, Abbotsbury (formerly Fairfield City Farm)
- Central Coast Zoo, Wyong Creek
- Central Gardens, Merrylands
- Coffs Coast Wildlife Sanctuary, Coffs Harbour
- Featherdale Wildlife Park, Doonside
- Hunter Valley Wildlife Park, Nulkaba (formerly Hunter Valley Zoo)
- Koala Park Sanctuary, West Pennant Hills
- Mogo Wildlife Park, Mogo (formerly Mogo Zoo)
- Oakvale Wildlife Park, Salt Ash
- Potoroo Palace Native Animal Educational Sanctuary, Merimbula (formerly Yellow Pinch Wildlife Park)
- Secret Creek Sanctuary, Lithgow
- Shoalhaven Zoo, Nowra
- Sydney Zoo, Bungarribee
- Symbio Wildlife Park, Helensburgh
- Tamworth Marsupial Park, East Tamworth
- Taralga Wildlife Park, Taralga
- Taronga Western Plains Zoo, Dubbo
- Taronga Zoo, Mosman
- Wagga Wagga Zoo, Wagga Wagga
- Wild Cat Conservation Centre, Wilberforce
- Wild Life Sydney, Darling Harbour
- Zambi Wildlife Retreat, Wallacia

== Northern Territory ==
- Alice Springs Desert Park, Alice Springs
- Alice Springs Reptile Centre, Alice Springs
- Crocodylus Park, Darwin
- Crocosaurus Cove, Darwin
- Territory Wildlife Park, Berry Springs

== Queensland ==
- Alexandra Park Zoo, Bundaberg
- Australia Zoo, Sunshine Coast
- Billabong Sanctuary, Nome, Townsville
- Birdworld Kuranda, Kuranda
- Bredl's Wildlife, Airlie Beach
- Brisbane Forest Park, Brisbane
- Cairns Koalas and Creatures, Cairns
- Cooberrie Park, Woodbury
- Currumbin Wildlife Sanctuary, Gold Coast
- Darling Downs Zoo, Pilton
- David Fleay Wildlife Park, Gold Coast
- Fraser Coast Wildlife Sanctuary, Maryborough
- Hartley's Crocodile Adventures, Palm Cove
- Ipswich Nature Centre, Ipswich
- Kumbartcho Sanctuary, Eatons Hill, Brisbane
- Kuranda Koala Gardens, Kuranda
- Lone Pine Koala Sanctuary, Brisbane
- Maleny Botanic Gardens and Bird World, Wootha
- Marineland Crocodile Park, Green Island
- Paradise Country, Oxenford
- Rainforestation Nature Park, Kuranda
- Rockhampton Zoo, Rockhampton
- Snakes Down Under Reptile Park and Zoo, Childers
- Walkabout Creek Wildlife Park, [[[Brisbane]]
- Wildlife Habitat, Port Douglas
- Wild Life Hamilton Island, Hamilton Island
- Wildlife HQ Zoo, Big Pineapple Woombye, Sunshine Coast

== South Australia ==
- Adelaide Zoo, Adelaide
- Bordertown Wildlife Park, Bordertown
- Bute Lions Fauna Park, Bute
- Cleland Wildlife Park, Cleland
- Glen-Forest Tourist Park, Port Lincoln
- Gorge Wildlife Park, Cudlee Creek
- Humbug Scrub Wildlife Sanctuary, One Tree Hill
- Kangaroo Island Wildlife Park, Seddon, Kangaroo Island
- Monarto Safari Park, Monarto
- Urimbirra Wildlife Park, Victor Harbor

== Tasmania ==
- Bonorong Wildlife Sanctuary, Brighton
- Devils@Cradle, Cradle Mountain
- East Coast Natureworld, Bicheno
- Hobart Zoo & Aquarium, Richmond
- Serpentarium Wildlife Park, St Helens
- Tasmania Zoo, Launceston
- Tasmanian Devil Unzoo, Taranna
- Trowunna Wildlife Park, Mole Creek
- Wing's Wildlife Park, Gunns Plains

== Victoria ==
- Ballarat Wildlife Park, Ballarat
- Ballarat Bird World, Mount Helen
- The Big Goose Kids Farm, Moorooduc
- Chesterfield Farm, Scoresby
- Fauna Australia, Lavers Hill
- The Funky Farm, Hastings
- Giant Koala Tourist Complex, Dadswell Bridge
- Great Ocean Road Wildlife Park, Gellibrand Lower
- Gumbuya World, Tynong North
- Halls Gap Zoo, Halls Gap
- Healesville Sanctuary, Healesville
- Jirrahlinga Dingo Conservation Park, Chewton
- Koala Conservation Reserve, Rhyll
- Kyabram Fauna Park, Kyabram
- Mansfield Zoo, Mansfield
- Maru Koala and Animal Park, Grantville
- Melbourne Zoo, Melbourne
- Moonlit Sanctuary Wildlife Conservation Park, Pearcedale
- Myuna Farm, Doveton
- Phillip Island Wildlife Park, Cowes
- Rotary Fauna Park, Kaniva
- Tinakori Animal Farm, Clunes
- Warracknabeal Lions Flora and Fauna Park, Warracknabeal
- Warrnambool Wildlife Encounters, Cudgee
- Wildlife Wonders, Apollo Bay
- Werribee Open Range Zoo, Werribee
- Yarra Valley Nocturnal Zoo

== Western Australia ==
- Armadale Reptile Centre, Armadale
- Australian Wildlife Park Albany, Torndirrup
- Bunbury Wildlife Park, Bunbury
- Broome Crocodile Park, Broome
- Caversham Wildlife Park, Whiteman, Perth
- Cohunu Koala Park, Perth
- Country Life Farm, Dunsborough
- Denmark Animal Farm, Denmark
- Discover Deadly, Carbunup River, Western Australia
- Esperance Bird & Animal Park, Gibson
- Greenough Wildlife & Bird Park, Greenough
- Hammond Park, Kalgoorlie
- Kanyana Wildlife Rehabilitation Centre, Lesmurdie
- Perth Zoo, Perth
- Ranger Red’s Zoo & Conservation Park, Mandurah
- Wave Rock Wildlife Park, Hyden
- West Australian Reptile Park, Henley Brook

== See also ==
- List of zoos
- List of aquaria in Australia
- List of botanical gardens in Australia
- List of beaches in Australia
