= Ballarat Wildlife Park =

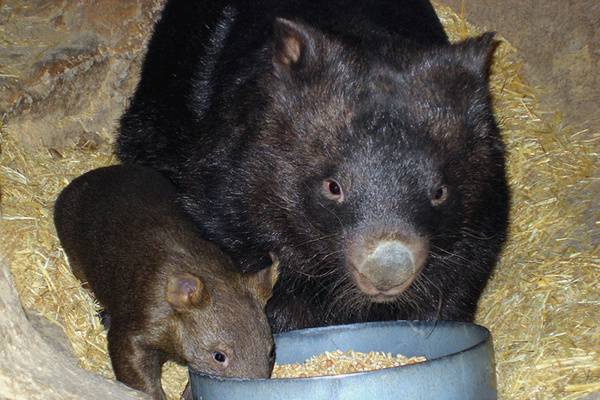
- Wombat and joey
- Interactive map of Ballarat Wildlife Park
- 37.5698°S 143.8926°E
- Date opened: 1987
- Location: Ballarat, Victoria, Australia
- Land area: 37 acres (15 ha)
- No. of animals: 400
- No. of species: 60+
- Website: www.wildlifepark.com.au

The Ballarat Wildlife Park is a zoo in Ballarat, Victoria. Opened in February 1985, it is privately owned by founder Greg Parker, and Julia Leonard and managed by Jared Mulholland. The 10-hectare park holds over 300 animals, including Australian animals—there are over 100 free-roaming kangaroos—and an extensive collection of reptiles. It was once well known for housing Patrick, the common wombat who was the oldest known marsupial in captivity when he died aged around 30 years old in 2017.

== History ==
Since buying his first python when he was ten years old, animal enthusiast Greg Parker amassed a collection of over 300 reptiles across 50 species. He got a job at Healesville Sanctuary in the late 1970s. After a year of planning, Parker bought 10 hectares (0.10 km^{2}) of land in Ballarat, Victoria, where he opened the Ballarat Wildlife Park in February 1985. He incorporated his reptile collection into the wildlife park, while also branching out into mammals. Parker co-owns the park with his partner, Julia Leonard, and manages it with a small team of permanent staff.

== Park ==
Certified by the Zoo and Aquarium Association, the 10-hectare Ballarat Wildlife Park is home to around 300 animals and 40 species. It is located on the corner of York and Fussell Streets, in Ballarat East. All of the Australian mammals breed each year, and the establishment also breeds its reptiles. The park contains many different exhibits and a cafe. It holds wildlife education talks and "meet-and-greets" with some of the animals can be booked; strict guidelines and time limits on handling the animals are in place.

The Ballarat Wildlife Park holds a number of Australian animals. It is home to the largest colony of koalas in captivity in Victoria, which has around 35 members. It has contributed to a number of koala conservation campaigns, including fundraisers for planting eucalyptus trees. Visitors can feed the over 100 free-roaming kangaroos by purchasing kangaroo feed. There are wombats, emus, cassowaries, quokkas, and special enclosures for endangered Australian animals such as Tasmanian devils. It was the first privately owned park to breed Tasmanian devils on the mainland. The dingoes have their own large enclosures, as do the tree-kangaroos.

The park also contains animals not native to Australia, including six meerkats,, and a Komodo dragon. The reptile house holds snakes, lizards and frogs.

List of animals
- Aldabra giant tortoise
- Alligator snapping turtle
- Alpaca
- American alligator
- Asian forest tortoise
- Australian green tree frog
- Australian water dragon
- Banded rock python
- Bare-nosed wombat
- Boa constrictor
- Broad-headed snake
- Brolga
- Brown tree snake
- Buff-banded rail
- Burmese python
- Bush stone-curlew
- Central bearded dragon
- Common snapping turtle
- Dingo
- Dyeing poison dart frog
- Eastern diamondback rattlesnake
- Eastern long-necked turtle
- Eastern tiger snake
- Eastern whipbird
- Eclectus parrot
- Emu
- Freshwater crocodile
- Frilled lizard
- Gila monster
- Goodfellow's tree-kangaroo
- Green anaconda
- Green tree python
- Indian star tortoise
- Indochinese spitting cobra
- Inland taipan
- Kangaroo Island grey kangaroo
- King brown snake
- Koala
- Komodo dragon
- Lace monitor
- Little penguin
- Magnificent tree frog
- Mangrove monitor
- Merten's water monitor
- Monocled cobra
- Noisy pitta
- Northern blue-tongued lizard
- Pig-nosed turtle
- Queensland lungfish
- Quokka
- Red-bellied pademelon
- Red-rumped parrot
- Red-tailed black cockatoo
- Reticulated python
- Rhinoceros iguana
- Rusty monitor
- Saltwater crocodile
- Shingleback lizard
- Short-beaked echidna
- Southern cassowary
- Southern corroboree frog
- Southern hairy-nosed wombat
- Spiny-tailed monitor
- Spotted-tail quoll
- Tasmanian devil
- Tawny frogmouth
- Tiger
- Uracoan rattlesnake
- Wedge-tailed eagle
- White-headed pigeon
- Yellow-footed tortoise

== Notable animals ==
Crunch is a five-metre-long saltwater crocodile which arrived at the park in December 2013. Originally captured from the Lockhart River, he and a female crocodile named Bella were brought to the park as a replacement for Gator, his deceased predecessor.

=== Patrick the Wombat ===
The Ballarat Wildlife Park was once well known for housing the common wombat Patrick, who holds the record for the oldest known common wombat in captivity. Nicknamed "Paddy Cake", he was also the heaviest known wombat; he weighed 84 pounds (38 kg) when he was 29 years old.

In 1989, an injured Patrick was taken from the pouch of his dying mother, who had been hit by a car. He lacked the typical aggression of wombats. Attempts to release him into the wild only resulted in him being attacked by wild wombats, and so the wildlife park instead acquired a permit to house him. He became one of Ballarat's most popular attractions, riding around in a wheelbarrow when his enclosure was being cleaned.

In 2013, Patrick became popular online through a Reddit post. He amassed over 55,000 Facebook followers and got his own website. In 2014, CNN's Rachel Barth named him the third-greatest city mascot in the world, writing that he has been visited by celebrities such as Nicolas Cage, Kirstie Alley and Kim Cattrall. He also visited Parliament House. Patrick received further media attention after the park created a promotional Tinder account for him. Patrick died on 18 April 2017, aged at least 30 years and 200 days, euthanized after a sudden decline in health. He died a virgin. He was listed in Guinness World Records as the "Oldest marsupial in captivity ever".
