= Hunter Valley Wildlife Park =

- Interactive map of Hunter Valley Wildlife Park
- 32.79627830106065°S 151.3634848362662°E
- Date opened: 2007
- Location: Nulkaba, New South Wales, Australia
- Land area: 18 acres
- No. of species: 110+
- Memberships: Zoo and Aquarium Association
- Owner: Australian Wildlife Parks
- Website: www.huntervalleyzoo.com.au

Hunter Valley Wildlife Park, formerly Hunter Valley Zoo, is a zoo in Nulkaba, New South Wales, Australia. It features a wide variety of Australian and exotic mammals, birds and reptiles.

Founded in 2007 as the Hunter Valley Zoo, it went through ownership change in 2021 and in was rebranded as Hunter Valley Wildlife Park in November of that year.

== Ownership change ==
In July 2021, the park underwent a significant transition when Elanor Investors Group acquired it. This acquisition was driven by the increase in domestic tourism due to travel restrictions imposed during the COVID-19 pandemic. The purchase aimed to capitalise on the heightened interest in local travel and the resulting increase in visitor numbers to regional attractions.

Following the acquisition by Elanor Investors Group, Australian Wildlife Parks purchased Hunter Valley Zoo in mid-July 2021. The new ownership brought changes to the park, including a rebranding effort to align it with its sister parks, Mogo Wildlife Park and Featherdale Wildlife Park. This rebranding resulted in the renaming of the zoo to Hunter Valley Wildlife Park, which was officially relaunched under this new name on November 19, 2021.

The relaunch as Hunter Valley Wildlife Park included enhancements and expansions aimed at improving the visitor experience, increasing the park's role in conservation education and better living conditions for the animals.

The park facilitates various interactive up-close animal encounter experiences for visitors who pay the additional 'VIP' fees, that allow those visitors to feed and interact with certain animals under supervision. The park states these encounters are to educate the public about the animals and their natural habitats, in the hopes of fostering a greater appreciation for wildlife conservation.

The park's facilities include picnic areas, playgrounds, and other amenities. Educational programs and presentations are regularly held, focusing on different species and conservation efforts.

As a ZAA-accredited institution, Hunter Valley Wildlife Park participates in breeding programs for endangered species and collaborates with other zoos and conservation organizations to support wildlife conservation initiatives. The park's involvement in these programs underscores its commitment to preserving biodiversity and protecting threatened species.

== Species list ==
The zoo houses the following species:

Birds (native)

- Apostlebird
- Australian bustard
- Beach stone-curlew
- Black swan
- Black-necked stork
- Black-fronted dotterel
- Bourke's parrot
- Bush stone-curlew
- Cape Barren goose
- Channel-billed cuckoo
- Chestnut rail
- Chestnut-breasted mannikin
- Chiming wedgebill
- Cockatiel
- Crescent honeyeater
- Crested bellbird
- Diamond dove
- Dusky woodswallow
- Eastern spinebill
- Eastern yellow robin
- Forest kingfisher
- Galah
- Glossy ibis
- Gouldian finch
- Great bowerbird
- Great egret
- Inland dotterel
- Laughing kookaburra
- Little corella
- Long-tailed finch
- Major Mitchell's cockatoo
- Nankeen kestrel
- Noisy pitta
- Pacific emerald dove
- Pheasant coucal
- Pied stilt
- Plumed whistling duck
- Purple-crowned lorikeet
- Radjah shelduck
- Rainbow bee-eater
- Rainbow lorikeet
- Red-collared lorikeet
- Red-tailed black cockatoo
- Regent bowerbird
- Scaly-breasted lorikeet
- Spiny-cheeked honeyeater
- Splendid fairywren
- Spotted bowerbird
- Star finch
- Tawny frogmouth
- Torresian crow
- Varied lorikeet
- Wandering whistling duck
- White-breasted woodswallow
- White-fronted chat
- Wonga pigeon

Birds (exotic)

- Blue and gold macaw
- Ostrich
- Egyptian goose
- Indian peafowl (including albino)
- Red junglefowl
- Yellow-crowned amazon

Mammals (native)

- Agile wallaby
- Bennett's wallaby (including albino)
- Common wombat
- Dingo
- Koala
- Quokka
- Red kangaroo (including albino)
- Rufous bettong
- Short-beaked echidna
- Tasmanian devil
- Western grey kangaroo (including albino)
- Yellow-footed rock-wallaby

Mammals (exotic and domestic)

- African lion (including Timbavati white lion)
- Barbary sheep
- Bearded emperor tamarin
- Binturong
- Black handed spider monkey
- Black-and-white ruffed lemur
- Blackbuck
- Bolivian squirrel monkey
- Capybara
- Caracal
- Common marmoset
- Cotton-top tamarin
- Dromedary camel
- European fallow deer
- Giraffe
- Goat
- Golden lion tamarin
- Maned wolf
- Meerkat
- Patagonian mara
- Plains zebra
- Red-handed tamarin
- Red-rumped agouti
- Ring-tailed lemur
- Serval
- Sheep
- Tufted capuchin

Reptiles (both exotic and native)

- African spurred tortoise
- American alligator
- Lace monitor
- Leopard tortoise
- Rhinoceros iguana

== Gallery ==
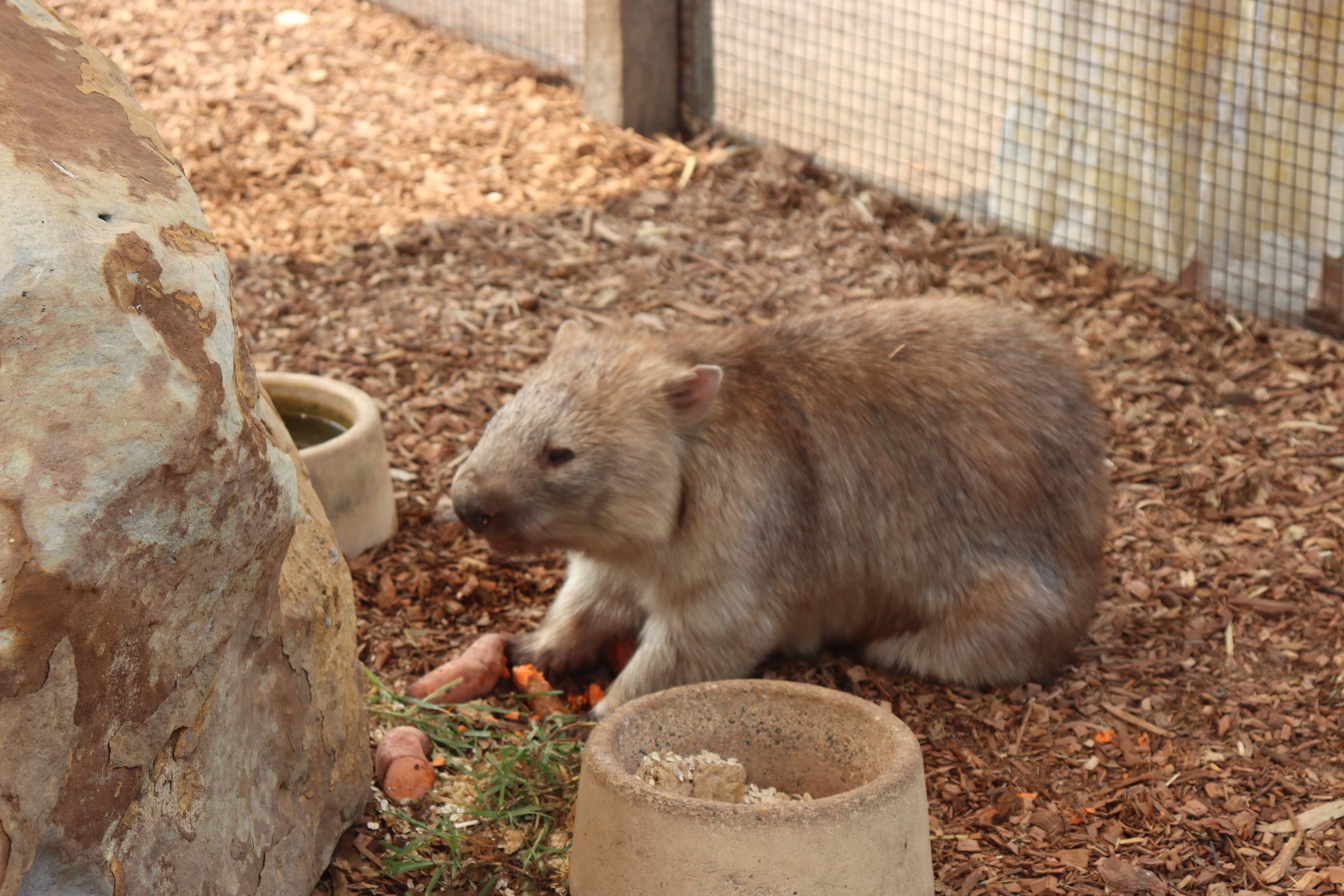
Common wombat

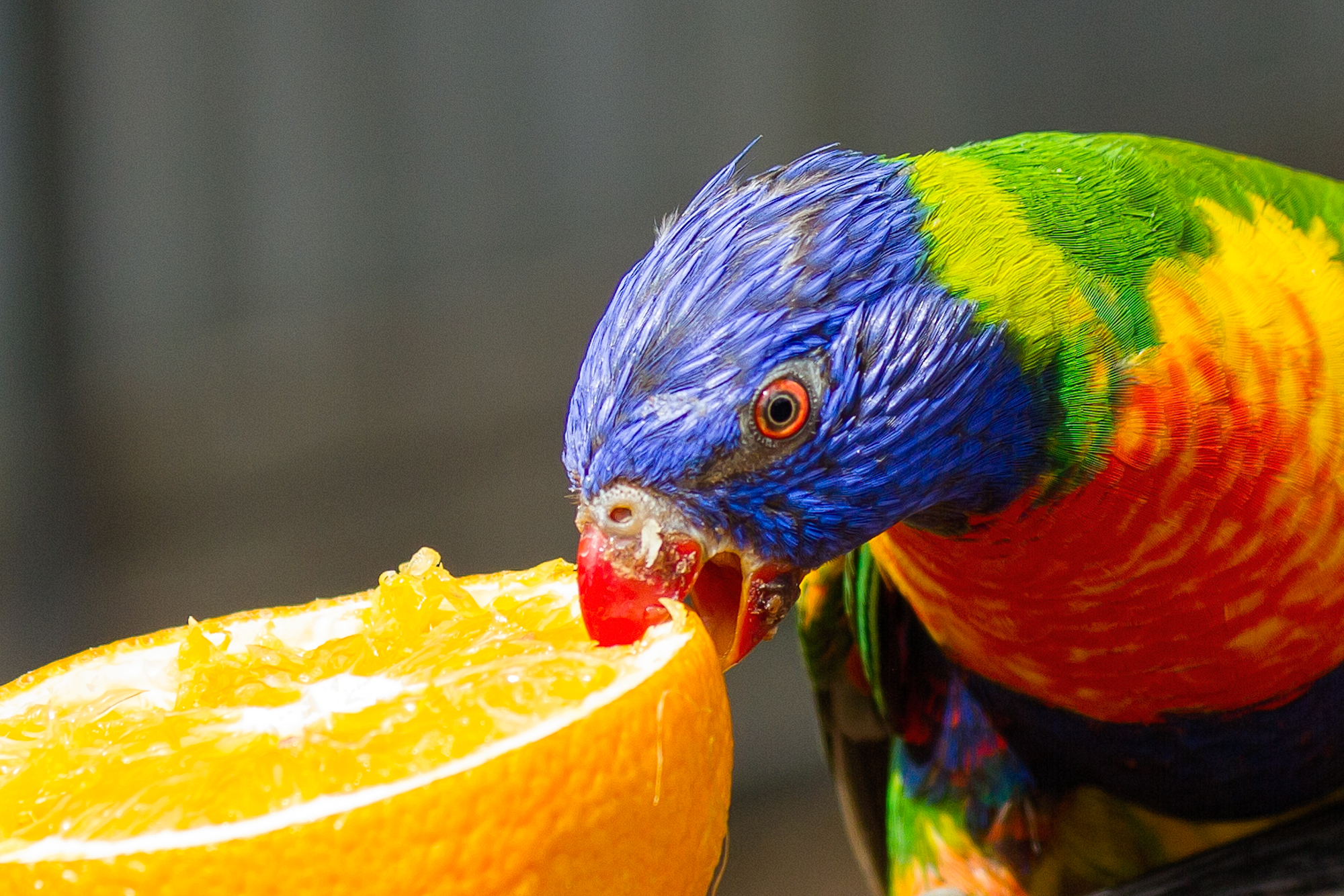
Rainbow lorikeet

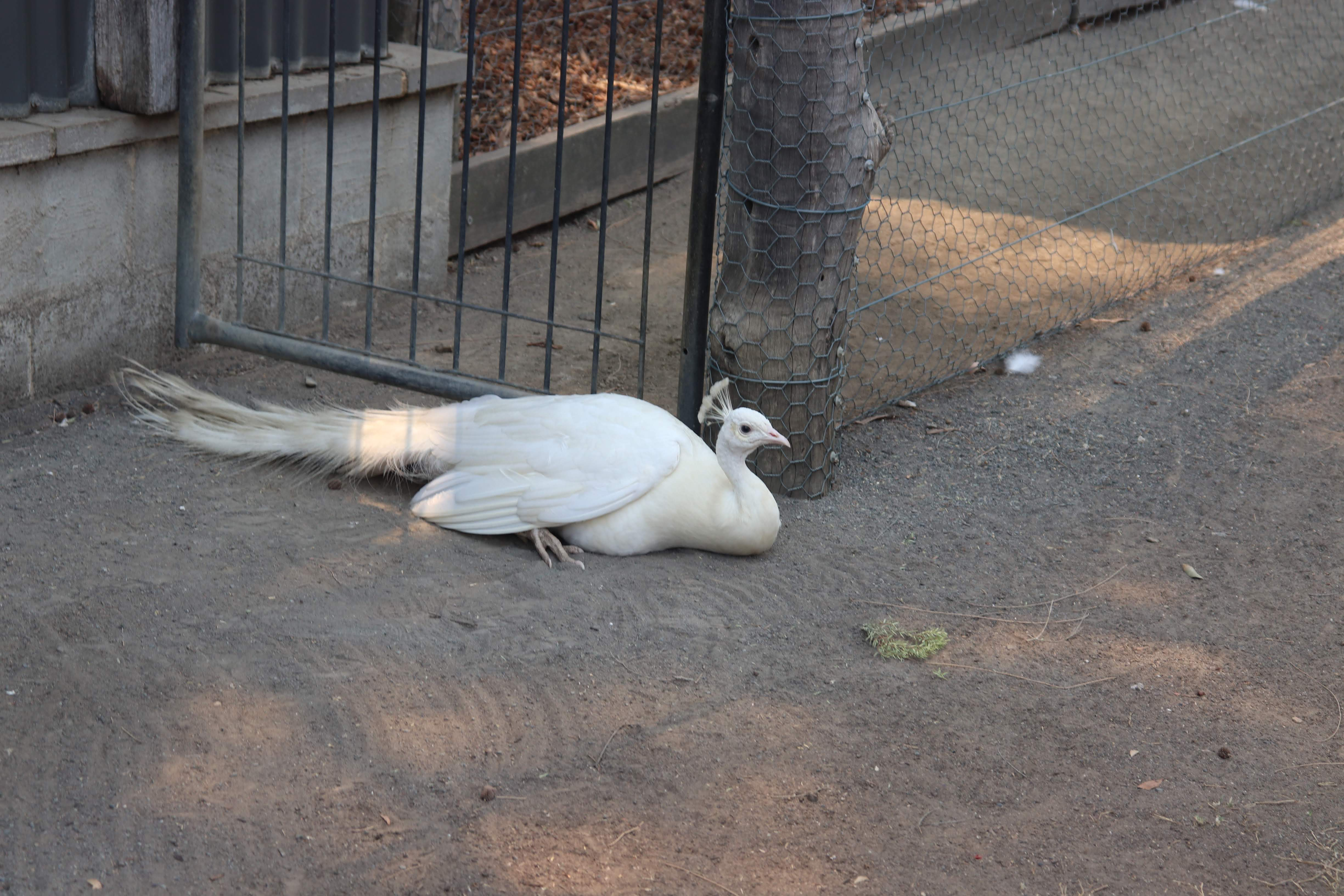
(Albino) Indian peafowl
