= Mansfield Zoo =

- Interactive map of Mansfield Zoo
- 37.127308°S 146.132187°E
- Date opened: 2000
- Location: Mansfield, Victoria, Australia
- Land area: 30 acres (12 ha)
- No. of animals: 100+
- Memberships: Zoo and Aquarium Association
- Website: www.mansfieldzoo.com.au

Mansfield Zoo is a 30-acre (12 ha) zoo located around ten kilometres outside Mansfield, Victoria. Established in 2000, it is privately owned by Bronwen Wilson and Dave Murphy.

Mansfield Zoo is home to over 220 animals, including both Australian and exotic species. Some of the animals, such as the kangaroos and deer, are free-roaming and can be hand fed by visitors who purchase animal feed at the zoo. The zoo also has four African lions, (including two rare white lions); visitors can watch the daily lion feedings. From September to May, visitors are also able to camp in the zoo for up to two days.

== History ==
Mansfield Zoo was established by Steve Junghenn in early 2000. The wildlife park initially contained only deer and other Australian animals, but it had two lions, brothers Kitwe and Monbu, by 2005. Junghenn eventually put the property up for sale.

Not content with her life in suburban Melbourne, Bronwen Wilson and her husband Rodney sold their house and business. In December 2005, they bought Mansfield Zoo for $800,000, moving to Mansfield with their two school-aged children Alisha and Jordan. Wilson's only prior experience with lions was two weeks of work experience at Melbourne Zoo. Though Wilson was adamant on holding on to the zoo, her husband disagreed with her decision to move to rural Victoria. He moved away after their divorce in 2007; Alisha went with him several months later. Wilson struggled as a single mother and zoo manager. In 2008, she met neighbouring farmer Dave Murphy, who became her new partner and co-manager of Mansfield Zoo. They are aided by Wilson's now-adult children.

The lion Monbu died in 2011, followed by his brother 18 months later. The male white lions Djuma and Matimba were transferred from the National Zoo & Aquarium in 2012. They were joined by the African lion Robbie (Rubani) and lioness Delilah in May 2014.

Mansfield Zoo was closed from April–May 2020 due to the COVID-19 pandemic.

== Park ==
Situated in sight of Mount Buller, the 30-acre (12 ha) Mansfield Zoo is part of a larger 100-acre (40 ha) property. It is located around 10km south of Mansfield, Victoria, at 1064 Mansfield Woods Point Rd. It is open from 10 am to 6 pm daily, except on Christmas. From September to May, visitors are also able to camp at the zoo for up to two days. Picnics and barbecues are also allowed. The zoo has plans to convert a W5 Class tram into an on-site café named Zoolicious. The tram arrived at the zoo in May 2020.

As of 2021, Mansfield Zoo has over 220 animals, including both Australian and exotic species. Their four lions and the daily lion feedings serve as the star attractions. The two white lions are separated by a fence from the two African lion. Some animals such as kangaroos and deer are free-roaming and, along with the guinea pigs, can be hand fed by visitors who purchase special animal feed. Other animals include emus, dingoes, monkeys, deer, water buffalo, antelope, llamas, ostriches, camels, a variety of birds and a colony of meerkats. In December 2021, the zoo acquired a pair of female maned wolves from Altina Wildlife Park.

Mansfield Zoo spends over $170,000 per year sourcing fresh produce to feed their animals.

Species list:

- African lion (including Timbavati white lion)
- Agile wallaby
- Alpaca
- American alligator
- American bison
- Arabian camel
- Asian water buffalo
- Bare-nosed wombat
- Black-capped capuchin
- Blackbuck
- Blue peafowl
- Common marmoset
- Cunningham's spiny-tailed skink
- Dingo
- Eastern blue-tongue lizard
- Eastern grey kangaroo
- Eastern long-necked turtle
- Eastern water dragon
- Emu
- Fallow deer
- Galah
- Guinea pig
- Helmeted guinea fowl
- Hog deer
- Llama
- Long-billed corella
- Maned wolf
- Meerkat
- Ostrich
- Plains zebra
- Red deer
- Red kangaroo (albino)
- Rhesus macaque
- Rusa deer
- Sambar deer
- Squirrel glider
- Sulphur-crested cockatoo
- Swamp wallaby
- Tasmanian brushtail possum (golden-furred)
- Texas longhorn cattle
- White-fronted capuchin
