= Oakvale Wildlife Park =

- Oakvale Wildlife Park logo
- Interactive map of Oakvale Wildlife Park
- 32°47′38″S 151°54′37″E
- Date opened: 1 November 1979
- Location: 3 Oakvale Drive, Salt Ash, New South Wales, Australia
- Land area: 10 ha (25 acres)
- No. of species: 100+
- Memberships: Zoo and Aquarium Association
- Website: oakvalewildlife.com.au

Oakvale Wildlife Park is a wildlife park established by the Sansom family in Salt Ash, in the Port Stephens region of New South Wales, Australia. It is home to a variety of animals which, while primarily native species of eastern Australia, includes some exotic species. It also has several children's play facilities, including a water-play area and tractor rides.

== Animal exhibits ==
Aviaries (some walk-through)

- Tawny frogmouth
- Laughing kookaburra
- Blue-winged kookaburra
- Australian magpie
- Bush stone-curlew
- Galah
- Sulphur-crested cockatoo
- Red-tailed black cockatoo
- Blue-and-gold macaw
- Cockatiel
- Eclectus parrot
- Superb parrot
- Alexandrine parrot
- Sun conure
- Purple-crowned lorikeet
- Rainbow lorikeet
- Diamond dove
- Bar-shouldered dove
- Pied imperial pigeon

'Reptile Ravine'

- Perentie
- Lace monitor
- Sand goanna
- Spencer's goanna
- Frilled lizard
- Eastern water dragon
- Boyd's forest dragon
- Central bearded dragon
- Pygmy bearded dragon
- Eastern blue-tongued lizard
- Northern blue-tongued lizard
- Shingleback lizard
- Cunningham's spiny-tailed skink
- Eastern Pilbara spiny-tailed skink
- Scrub python
- Olive python
- Woma python
- Black-headed python
- Centralian carpet python
- Darwin carpet python (albino)
- Water python

Other reptiles

- American alligator
- Saltwater crocodile (juvenile)
- Murray River turtle
- Eastern long-necked turtle

'Wetlands Walk' and 'Waterfowl Pond'

- Royal spoonbill
- Black swan
- Canada goose
- Cape Barren goose
- Brown Chinese goose
- Australian wood duck
- Muscovy duck
- Pacific black duck
- Plumed whistling duck
- Wandering whistling duck
- Freckled duck
- Mallard duck
- Aylesbury duck
- Indian runner duck
- Grey teal duck
- Chestnut teal duck
- Radjah shelduck
- Eurasian coot
- Dusky moorhen

'Lemur Island'

- Ring-tailed lemur

'Wallaby Walk'

- Red-necked wallaby
- Parma wallaby
- Swamp wallaby
- Tammar wallaby
- Quokka

Adjacent exhibits

- Dingo
- Lumholtz's tree-kangaroo
- Meerkat
- Red panda
- Emu
- Common ostrich

'Nocturnal House'

- Eastern quoll
- Southeastern common brushtail possum
- Southeastern ringtail possum
- Sugar glider

Adjacent exhibits ('Koala Country' etc.)

- Koala
- Bare-nosed wombat
- Tasmanian devil
- Short-beaked echidna
- Southern cassowary
- Wedge-tailed eagle
- Barn owl

'Farmyard Nursery'

…is a walkthrough animal nursery which includes:

- Domestic goat
- Domestic sheep
- Guinea pig
- Domestic rabbit including Flemish giant rabbit
- Chinese silky bantam
- Helmeted guinea fowl

Paddocks

- Donkey
- Miniature pony
- Domestic pig (including Berkshire pig)
- Arabian camel
- Llama
- Alpaca
- Water buffalo
- Scottish highland cattle and Texas longhorn cattle
- Jersey cow, Holstein-Freisian cow and Red Angus calves

Kangaroo area

- Red kangaroo
- Eastern grey kangaroo
