= Billabong Zoo =

Billabong Zoo Koala & Wildlife Park
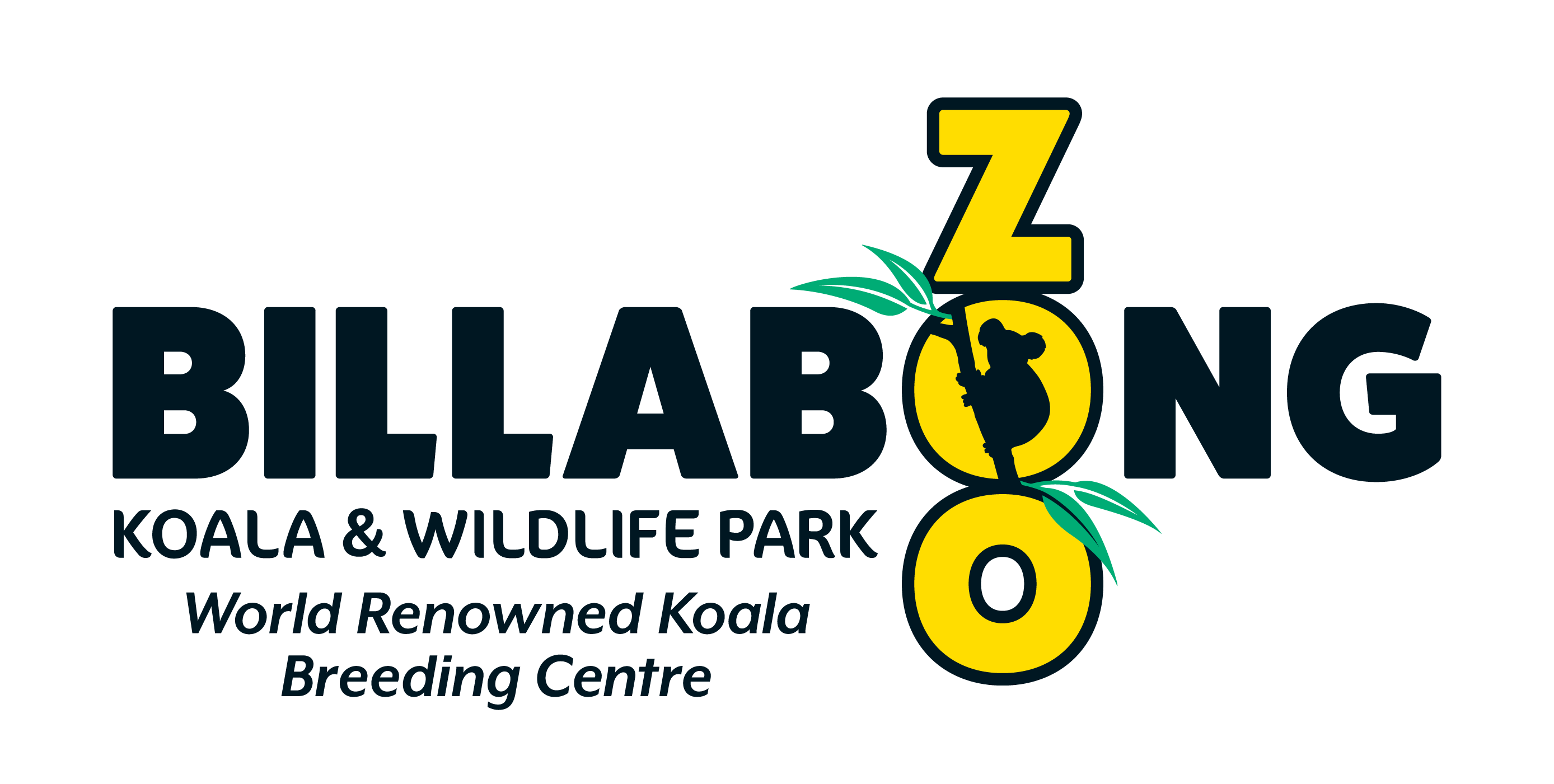
- Interactive map of Billabong Zoo Koala & Wildlife Park
- 31.459°S 152.820°E
- Date opened: 1986
- Location: Port Macquarie NSW
- Land area: 10 acres (4.0 ha)
- No. of species: 30+
- Memberships: Zoo and Aquarium Association
- Website: www.billabongzoo.com.au

Billabong Zoo is a 10-acre (4.0 ha) wildlife park and koala breeding centre located in Port Macquarie, New South Wales, Australia. It was opened in 1986, and features a wide variety of Australian and exotic animals.

== History ==
The park was opened in 1986, and was a major breeding centre for koalas. Starting in 2005, new ownership of the park has seen it move from simply breeding koalas to a more common wildlife park.

== Exhibits ==
The park contains a number of native and exotic animals.

- African lion
- Asian small-clawed otter
- Bare-nosed wombat
- Black-handed spider monkey
- Blue-and-gold macaw
- Blue-fronted amazon
- Bush stone-curlew
- Cheetah
- Common death adder
- Common marmoset
- Cotton-top tamarin
- Dingo
- Eastern grey kangaroo
- Eastern quoll
- Emu
- Fennec fox
- Fijian crested iguana
- Glossy black cockatoo
- Green and golden bell frog
- Green iguana
- Indian star tortoise
- Koala
- Little penguin
- Lumholtz's tree-kangaroo
- Meerkat
- Orange-bellied parrot
- Pygmy bearded dragon
- Red panda
- Red-necked wallaby
- Saltwater crocodile
- Snow leopard
- Southern cassowary
- Southern hairy-nosed wombat

== Facilities ==
The park also contains picnic barbeques, gardens, and billabongs (small lakes) covered with water lilies and stocked with koi carp and a visiting speckled longfin eel. It also features a café in the main entrance building.

== Education ==
The park has a number of education talks through the day including a koala photo session.

== Conservation ==
The park breeds koalas to send to other zoos in the Australasian breeding program.

In 2011 the park joined the Zoo and Aquarium Association and has participated in a number of species management programs including koalas and snow leopards.

== See also ==
- Taronga Zoo
