= Tasmania Zoo =

Zoo in Launceston, Tasmania, Australia

- Interactive map of Tasmania Zoo
- 41°25′51″S 146°58′42″E
- Date opened: 2003
- Location: Ecclestone Road, Riverside, Tasmania
- No. of animals: 1,500+
- No. of species: 100+
- Memberships: Zoo & Aquarium Association
- Major exhibits: big cats, monkeys, gibbons, marsupial mammals, birds, reptiles (including crocodilias)
- Website: Tasmania Zoo

Tasmania Zoo is a zoo located in Launceston, in the Australian state of Tasmania. Situated on 900 acres (360 ha) of old growth native bushland, it is home to the state's largest collection of native and exotic animals. Tasmania Zoo is a fully accredited member of the Zoo and Aquarium Association, working closely with all Australasian zoos, and are involved in various species management programs.

== History ==
The zoo was opened in 2003 by Richard Warren and daughter Rochelle Penney. Warren created the Tasmania Zoo as a "legacy to Tasmania" to educate the community. His daughter said about her father after his death in 2018, he "had a special affinity for animals who were on the endangered list. “'He wanted to create the zoo so he could show these exotic and endangered animals and people from Tasmania could see them right here in the state.... Over the past 15 years, Dad’s small fauna park has grown from native wildlife to now include exotic and threatened species and participates in formal conservation programs'".

A tribute described the 71-year-old (zoo owner Dick Warren) as a “crazy inventor” who always had a “devil of a time”.

— Mr Warren’s daughter and Tasmania Zoo manager, Rochelle Penney

== Exhibits & Species ==
Exhibits include Tasmanian devils, bare-nosed wombats, Sumatran tigers, African lions, servals, caracals, quolls, emus, koalas, eastern grey kangaroos, reptiles and monkeys. They exhibit the second largest collection of primates in any private zoo in Australia. Along with over 100 other species & 1000 individual animals. Conservation work carried out by the zoo includes a breeding program for Tasmanian devils called Devil's Heaven.

The first red panda for Tasmania arrived at the zoo in 2017. Mandu was born in 2015 at the Melbourne Zoo.

In 2018 the zoo received sibling Sumatran tigers, Cinta and Jalur. The pair had lived in Symbio Wildlife Park in Sydney since they were two-years old, they celebrated their tenth birthday before leaving Symbio Park. The Tasmanian Zoo head keeper, Emma Morgan said that they had been preparing for their arrival for a long time. The winters are colder in Tasmania than Sydney, "They do have nice heated dens, comfy beds and they have a nice thick coat as well." Morgan says that the zoo has housed large cats before and are prepared.

On Christmas day 2019 the zoo received three golden lion tamarins, Fraggle, Mokey and Olmec. Native to Brazil, these monkeys came from Mogo Zoo in New South Wales. The three are all male, but as they are an endangered species the zoo hopes to receive a female for breeding.

Sister cheetahs Zari and Tafara were new additions to the zoo in January 2020. The zoo had built an enclosure in 2012 and finally has residents. The cheetahs came from Monarto Zoo in South Australia.

In October 2020 the zoo unveiled an electronic tyrannosaurus rex that had been housed at the Queen Victoria Museum. The t-rex weighs 700 kilograms and was too large to travel when the Queen Victoria Museum exhibit moved to New Zealand.

In October 2021, an 18 month old male snow leopard named Sikari arrived at the zoo.

The zoo is available for birthday parties and private events. Animal encounters and "adoptions" of animals are also available.

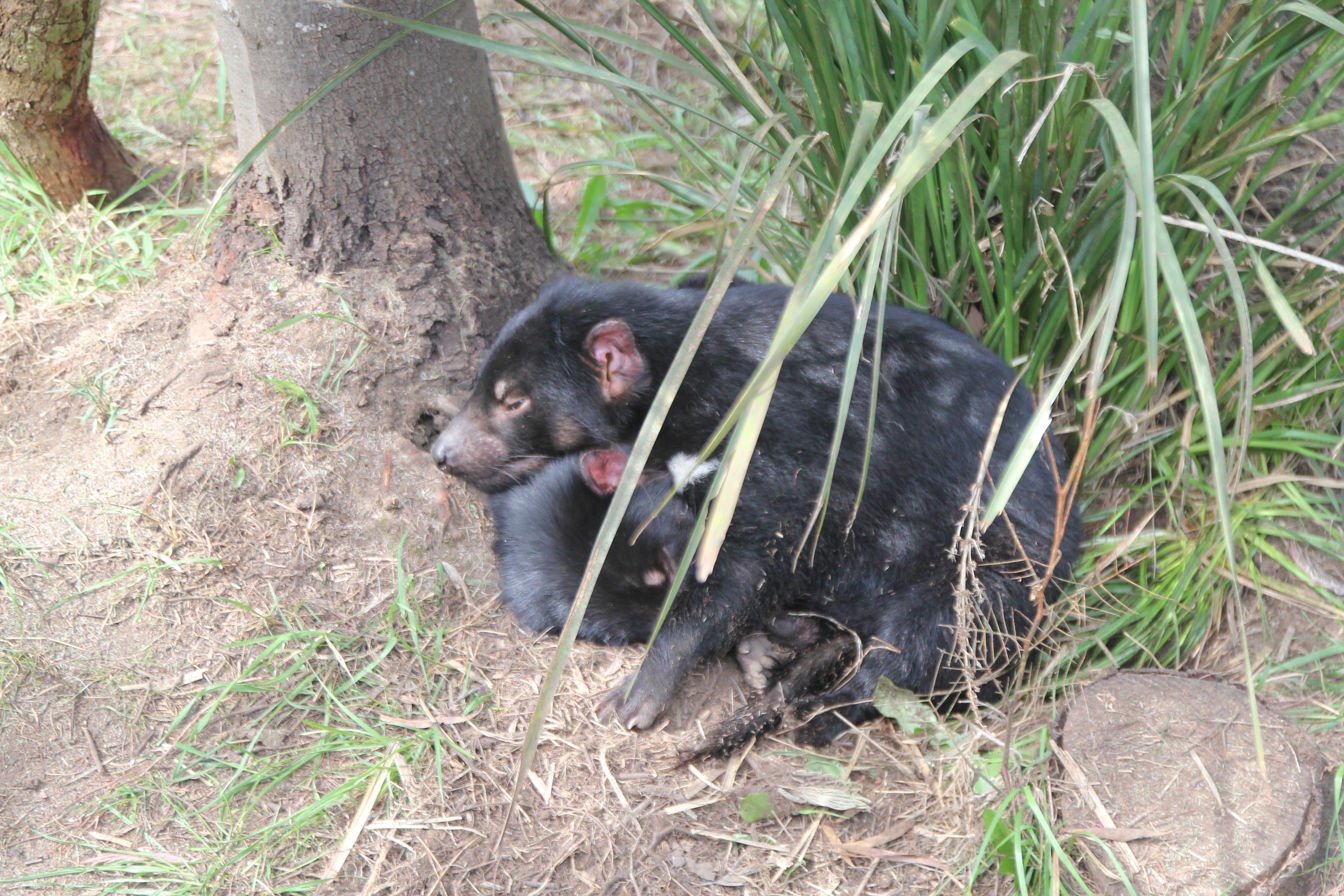
Tasmanian devils cuddle

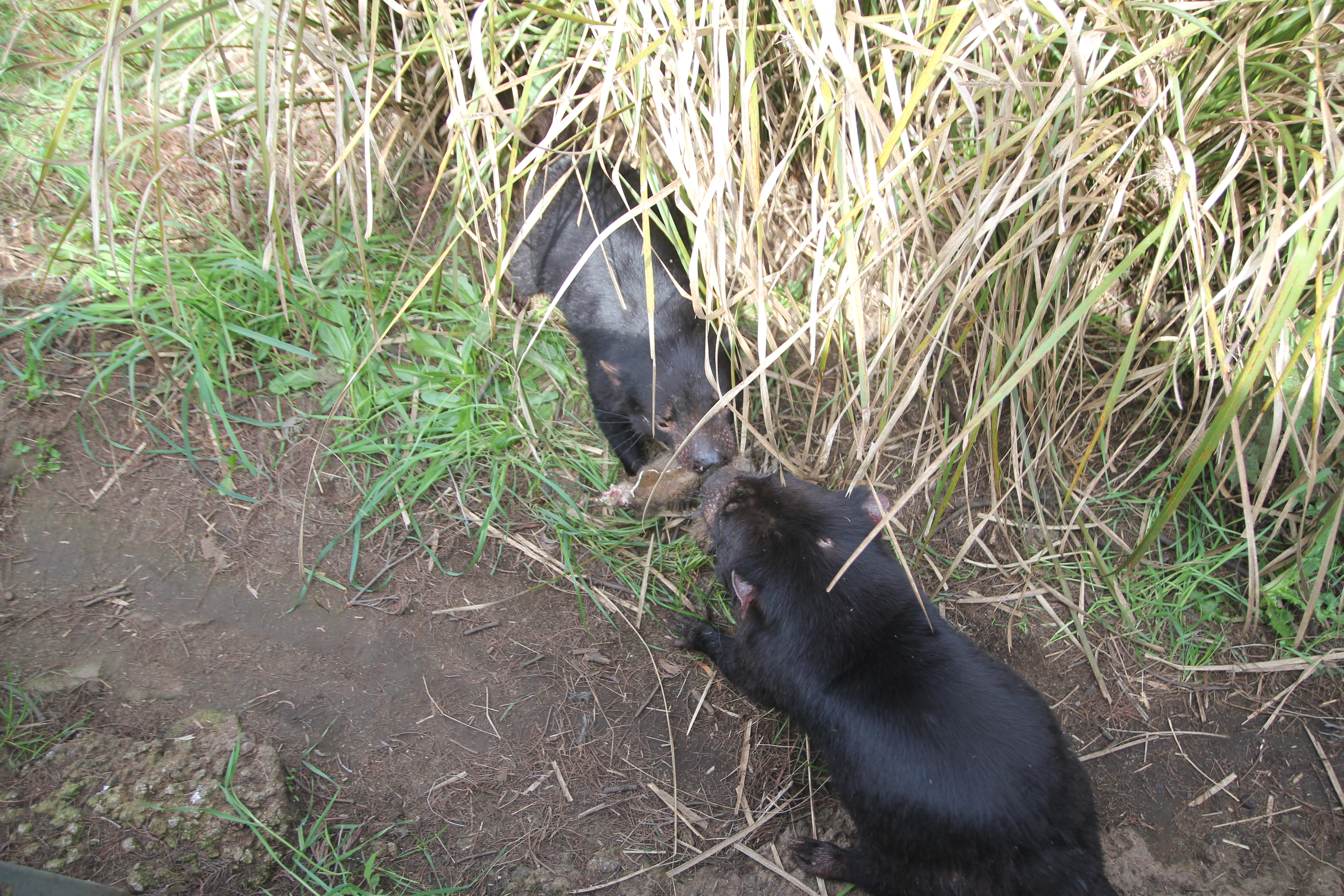
Tasmanian devils fighting over food

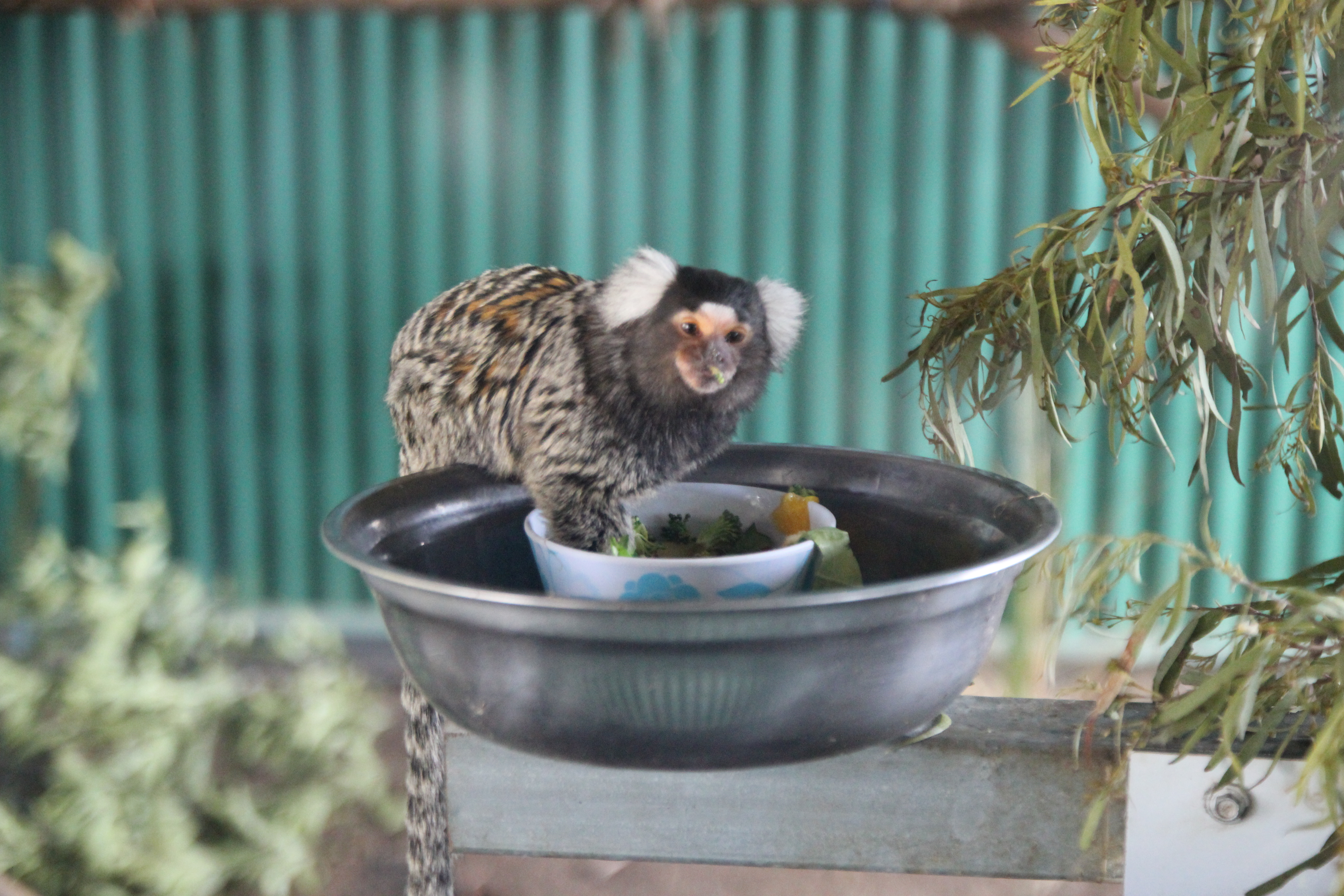
Common marmoset

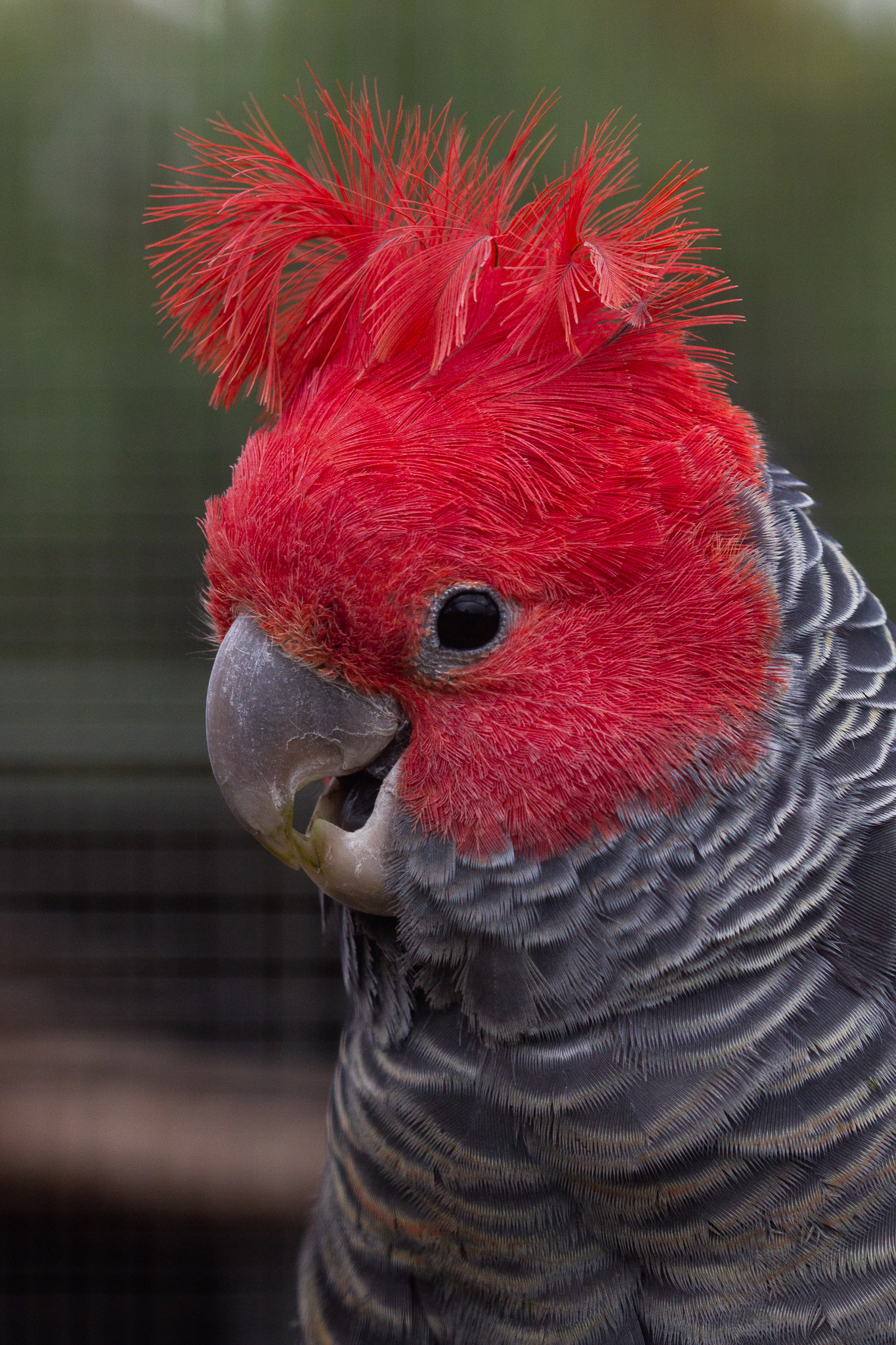
Gigi the gang-gang cockatoo

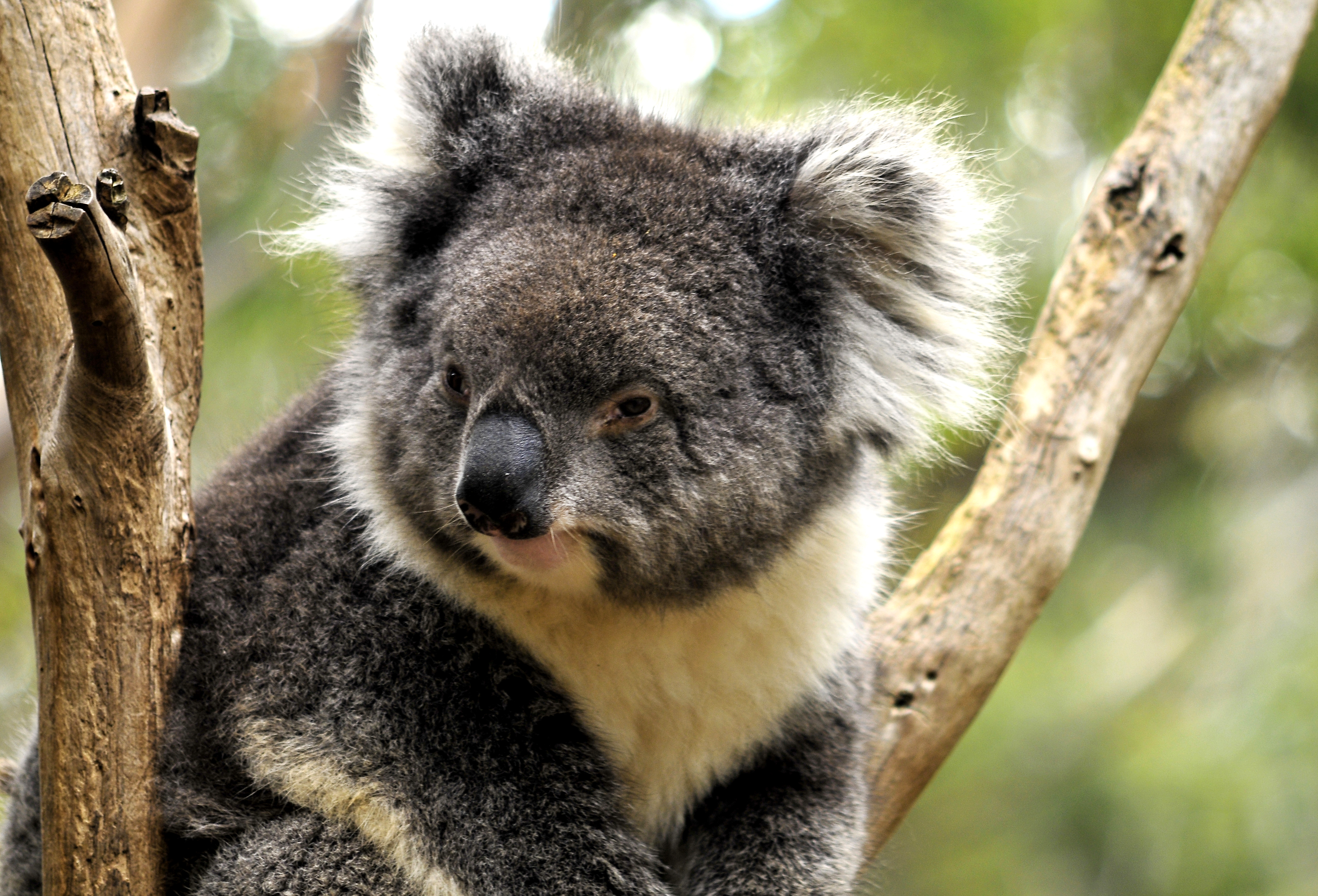
Koala

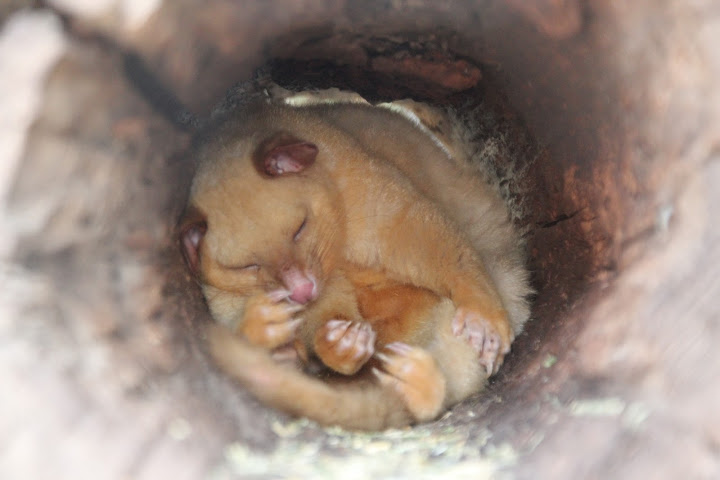
Tasmanian brushtail possum sleeping

Animals at the zoo include:

Birds

- Australian king parrot
- Blue and yellow macaw
- Blue-winged parrot
- Bourke’s parrot
- Budgerigar
- Bush stone curlew
- Canary
- Cape Barren goose
- Carnaby’s black cockatoo
- Chestnut-eared finch
- Cockatiel
- Eastern rosella
- Eclectus parrot
- Emu
- Gang-gang cockatoo
- Golden pheasant
- Green cheeked conure
- Green rosella
- Grey parrot
- Hahn’s macaw
- Helmeted guineafowl
- Hooded parrot
- Indian rose-ringed parakeet
- Jandaya parakeet
- Japanese quail
- Kākāriki
- King quail
- Laughing kookaburra
- Little corella
- Little penguin
- Lovebirds
- Major Mitchell’s cockatoo
- Mallee ringneck parrot
- Mandarin duck
- Moustached parakeet
- Northern rosella
- Parrotfinch
- Princess parrot
- Red-rumped parrot
- Star finch
- Sulphur-crested cockatoo
- Sun conure
- Superb parrot
- Swift parrot
- Tawny frogmouth
- Turquoise parrot
- Western long-billed corella
- Western rosella
- Yellow-tailed black cockatoo

Mammals

- African lion
- African wild dog
- Alpaca
- Asian small-clawed otter
- Bennett’s wallaby
- Black-and-white ruffed lemur
- Black-capped capuchin monkey
- Bolivian squirrel monkey
- Caracal
- Cheetah
- Common marmoset
- Cotton-top tamarin
- Crab-eating macaque
- Dingo
- De Brazza's monkey
- Dromedary camel
- Eastern quoll
- Emperor tamarin
- European fallow deer
- Forester grey kangaroo
- Giraffe
- Golden-handed tamarin
- Golden lion tamarin
- Greater capybara
- Guinea pig
- Hamadryas baboon
- Javan binturong
- Koala
- Maned wolf
- Meerkat
- Miniature donkey
- Northern white-cheeked gibbon
- Plains zebra
- Pygmy marmoset
- Red panda
- Ring-tailed lemur
- Serval
- Siamang
- Snow leopard
- Spotted hyena
- Spotted-tailed quoll
- Sri Lankan leopard
- Sumatran tiger
- Tasmanian brushtail possum
- Tasmanian devil
- Tasmanian echidna
- Tasmanian ringtail possum
- Tasmanian wombat

Reptiles

- Black-headed python
- Black tiger snake
- Inland Children's python
- Jungle carpet python
- Northern Territory carpet python
- Spotted python

== Devil facial tumour disease ==
In 2005 Warren built twenty "off-display enclosures and housed 20 orphaned baby Tasmanian devils. The devils were orphaned by parents who had succumbed to devil facial tumour disease". According to Penney, the zoo "[W]as the first wildlife establishment to work with [the] Department of Primary Industries, Water and Environment in the fight against Devil Facial Tumour Disease. This special population of devils not only remained disease-free but have bred successfully every year since and contribute their important genes'".

In 2012 the zoo was awarded a $28,394 grant from The University of Tasmania Foundation to improve food preparation for Tasmanian devil insurance populations. Warren said "that the money would be used to establish a full-time food storage and preparation area with walk-in freezer, allowing the facility to increase the capacity of its Devils' Haven area by a further 20 breeding animals".

== 2012 intrusion ==
On 2 August 2012, an intrusion occurred at the zoo, and the entrances to about thirty enclosures were opened. Dozens of animals, some endangered, escaped. The intruders also killed about a dozen birds, including a Tasmanian swift parrot, fewer than 1,000 of which remain in the wild. The park's population of quolls was released, but the Tasmanian devils were not harmed. Penney was concerned that if not found, many of the animals would die: "A lot of our animals are in captivity for a reason. They won't survive on their own." The zoo does not receive government funding and Penney estimated that replacing each of the birds would cost up to 2,000 Australian dollars.

== Funding during COVID-19 lockdown ==
In March 2020 the zoo was forced to close to visitors for the first time in its seventeen year history. The zoo does not receive government funding, relying on attendance numbers, donations and corporate sponsorships. The zoo "receives unused produce from Woolworths and Coles Supermarkets as part their farmer's programs". According to Penney, "'But when you're looking at our carnivores like our tigers, lions or our newly-arrived cheetahs ... the food bill for those guys alone is enormous'". The zoo does not have the money to pay wages, but the zoo houses over 1,500 animals that need to be cared for. Penney says "'I'm lucky to have an amazing team of zookeepers here who are now volunteering so we can get through this'". It's uncertain if the government was going to help fund the zoo during the lockdown. One area of concern is that the Tasmanian Devils were starting to enter their breeding season which requires a lot of monitoring by the zookeepers. A donation link was set up to help out the park.

Tasmania Zoo was an icon ... [it] has been a feature piece of Northern Tasmania’s tourism industry for years, and it’s definitely been a forerunner in that space. Tasmania Zoo is something every Northern Tasmania should be proud of, I’ve taken both of my kids there, it’s a great attraction.

— Tourism Northern Tasmania chief executive Chris Griffin
