= Zambi Wildlife Retreat =

Zoo in New South Wales, Australia

- Interactive map of Zambi Wildlife Retreat
- 33°52′11″S 150°40′12″E
- Date opened: 2012
- Location: 279 Park Rd, Wallacia, New South Wales, Australia
- Land area: 20 ha (50 acres)
- No. of animals: 100+
- No. of species: 15+
- Memberships: Zoo and Aquarium Association
- Website: www.zambiwildliferetreat.org

Zambi Wildlife Retreat is a private-tour zoo (and rescue zoo of former circus animals), located in Wallacia, New South Wales, Australia in the outskirts of western Sydney, that operates at the former site of the Bullens family property, and adopted some of the Bullen's former animals. The Zambi foundation was established by Silke Bader, Traci Griffiths and Donna Wilson in 2012. Its officially stated focus is the re-homing captive wild animals such as lions, tigers (including Siberian tiger), Sri Lankan leopard, cheetah, dingos, wolfdogs, red panda, Mongolian wild horses (takhis), hamadryas baboons, crab-eating macaques, common marmosets, meerkats, hyacinth macaws, Hahn's macaws, blue-and-gold macaws, green-winged macaws, red-tailed black cockatoos, sun conures, koi carp, and until recently the last puma held in Australia (Kota, who died in 2020 aged 19).

Visiting is by pre-arranged appointment and donation and tours are said to offer feeding and interaction opportunities with some of the animals. In 2025, the Zambi team rescued three herds of Mongolian wild horses (takhis) from the nearby abandoned Ferndale Estate at Mulgoa.
