= Wild Cat Conservation Centre =

Conservation centre in New South Wales, Australia

- Interactive map of Wild Cat Conservation Centre
- Type: conservation centre
- Location: Carrs Rd; Wilberforce, New South Wales, Australia.
- Coordinates: 33.530946°S 150.847221°E
- Established: 2016
- Other information: ZAA accredited member due to its conservation work
- Website: wildcatcentre.org.au

Wild Cat Conservation Centre is a wild felid conservation centre in Wilberforce, New South Wales, Australia. It is a privately owned facility of 10 hectares northeast of Sydney and operates as a charitable organisation. The centre focuses on wild felid conservation, particularly smaller, less well known, species.

Though the educational and conservational purpose of the centre is concerned with protecting all wild cat species, Ben Britton the owner and director of the facility established the centre because 99% of the international felid conservation funding was directed towards only the seven largest species of the forty different wild cats in the world.

Clouded leopards Cinta, Mark, Moana and Tai are the only four to be kept in Australasia with the park actively involved in an international conservation program for the cats which are listed as a vulnerable species by the IUCN (International Union for conservation of nature).

Caracal duo Kaia and Kato were the first pair in Australia to produce kittens when a pair were born to them at the park in March 2020.

The centre is home to five different wild cat species:

- Caracal
- Cheetah
- Clouded leopard
- Fishing cat
- Serval

The centre also houses two marmoset monkey species and eight reptile species.
