= Kanyana Wildlife Rehabilitation Centre =

Wildlife rehabilitation centre in Western Australia

- Interactive map of Kanyana Wildlife Rehabilitation Centre
- Type: Wildlife rehabilitation and conservation centre
- Location: 120 Gilchrist Road; Lesmurdie, Western Australia.
- Coordinates: 32°1′11″S 116°2′26″E
- Other information: ZAA accredited member due to its veterinary, wildlife nursing and conservation work

Kanyana Wildlife Rehabilitation Centre is a not-for-profit organisation and establishment located in Lesmurdie, Western Australia. It is dedicated to wildlife conservation by caring for sick, injured, orphaned and displaced native animals, breeding threatened native species, animal care training, research, and education through schools and local communities.

Established in the 1970s by June and Lloyd Butcher in their home laundry in Gooseberry Hill, Kanyana quickly expanded and took over the whole of their home. In 1986 a basic hospital and enclosures were designed and built by Lloyd to June's specifications in the backyard of their 3-hectare (7.4-acre) property. In that same year Kanyana admitted seventy animals. In 1989 the hospital doubled in size again.

In 1993 captive breeding of western barred bandicoots began and Kanyana was incorporated as a voluntary organisation with about 20 volunteers. In 1994 their education program started with nocturnal tours of the centre and visits to schools in the greater Perth area. In 1996 captive breeding of bilbies began. In the early 2000s a formal research program in conjunction with Murdoch Veterinary School began. Kanyana began conducting training programs for other organisations. In 2006 when a parasite was discovered during research into the papilloma/polyoma virus affecting western barred bandicoots it was named eimeria kanyana in commendation for Kanyana's dedicated work with the bandicoots (and many other animals). By 2008 admissions to the centre exceeded 1,800 per year.

In 2010 Kanyana moved to Paxwold, the purpose-built facility funded by Lotterywest with support received from the Western Australian Department of Environment of Conservation and Kalamunda Shire. In 2012 Kanyana's Wildlife Discovery Centre was established with funding from Chevron Australia, and Kanyana is supported by more than 300 volunteers. By 2014 admissions exceeded 2,400 for the year and Kanyana was awarded the Kalamunda Chamber of Commerce Business Excellence Awards: The President's Award and the Staff Training and Development Award. In 2015 the Zoo and Aquarium Association admitted Kanyana as an Associate Institutional Member after a glowing report from the Association's Accreditation Program. In 2016 it was awarded the Zoo and Aquarium Association In-situ Conservation Award for its woylie breeding program, as well as the Western Australian Small Business Environment Award the following year. Kanyana offers volunteers training, education programs and advance-booked public tours of its facilities such as its conservation area(s), wildlife hospital and rehabilitation centre.
