= List of aquaria in Australia =

This is a list of public aquariums in Australia. This list includes public aquariums, oceanariums, marine mammal parks, and dolphinariums.

== Australian Capital Territory ==
- National Zoo & Aquarium – Canberra

== New South Wales ==
- Irukandji Shark & Ray Encounters – Port Stephens
- Merimbula Aquarium – Merimbula
- Sea Life Sydney Aquarium – Sydney
- Solitary Islands Aquarium - Coffs Harbour
- Coffs Coast Wildlife Sanctuary - Coffs Harbour

== Queensland ==
- Aquasearch Aquarium – Nelly Bay, Magnetic Island
- Cairns Aquarium
- Reef World – Hervey Bay
- Reef HQ – Townsville (temporarily closed, expected reopening in 2029)
- SeaLife Sunshine Coast – Mooloolaba
- Sea World – Gold Coast

== South Australia ==
- Oceanic Victor – Granite Island, Encounter Bay

== Tasmania ==
- Seahorse World – Beauty Point
- Hobart Zoo & Aquarium - Richmond

== Victoria ==
- Sea Life Melbourne Aquarium – Melbourne

== Western Australia ==
- Aquarium of Western Australia – Perth
- Ocean Park Aquarium – Denham, Shark Bay
- Ningaloo Centre
- Dolphin Discovery Centre Bunbury – Bunbury

== See also ==
- List of aquaria
