= National Zoo & Aquarium =

National Zoo and Aquarium

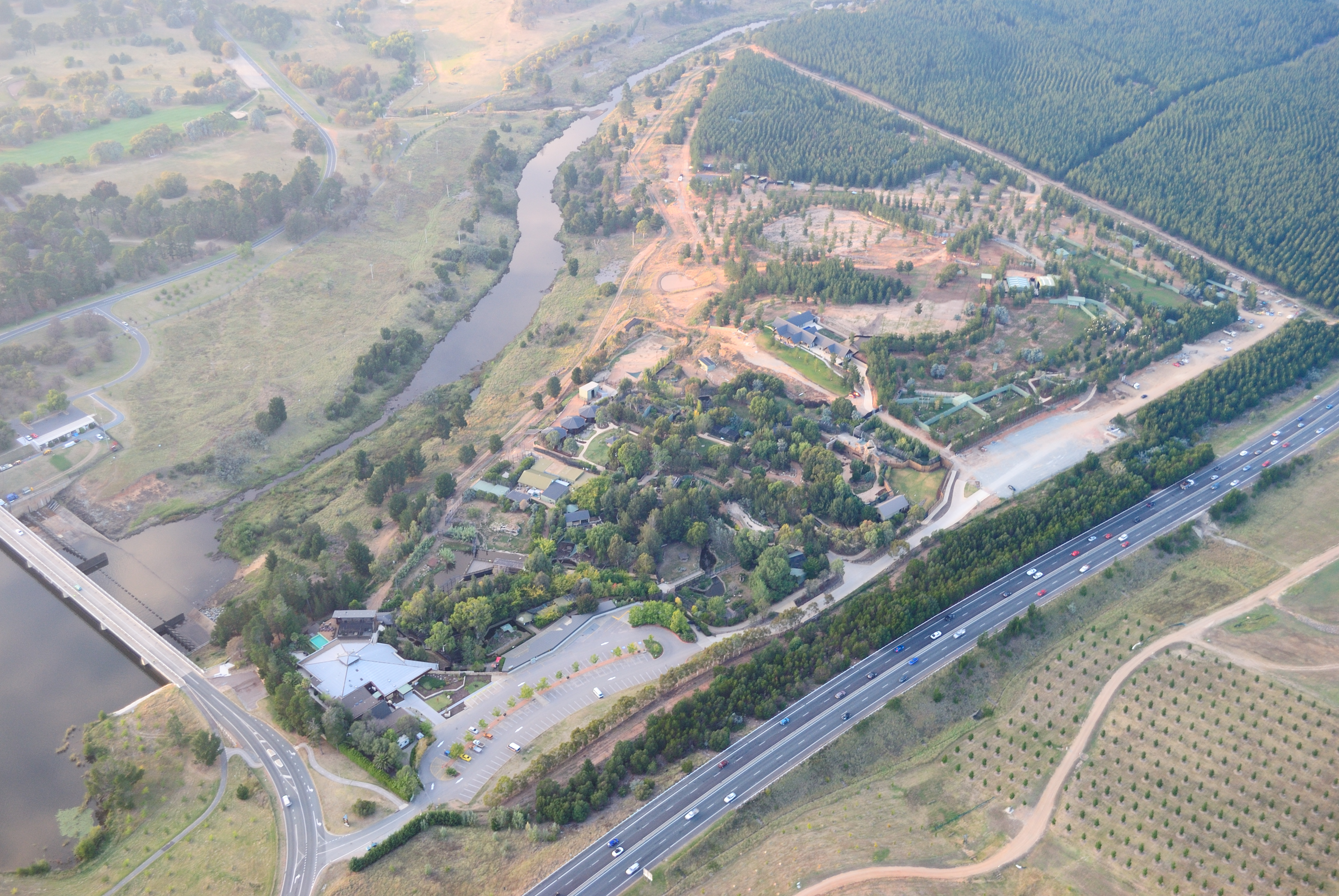
- Interactive map of National Zoo and Aquarium
- 35°18′2″S 149°4′10″E
- Location: Weston Creek, Australian Capital Territory
- Land area: 19 ha (47 acres)
- No. of animals: Approx 200 (not including fish)
- No. of species: 75
- Memberships: ZAA
- Website: www.nationalzoo.com.au

The National Zoo and Aquarium is a privately owned 19-hectare (47-acre) zoo and aquarium in the Australian capital city of Canberra. It is located in Yarralumla at the western end of Lake Burley Griffin, next to Scrivener Dam. A major expansion opened in May 2017, with 12 ha (30 acres) of open range exhibits.

== The Zoo ==
The National Zoo and Aquarium is privately owned by Canberra businessman Richard Tindale, and is maintained as a predominantly family-run business. The zoo receives no Government or Commonwealth support and relies on entry fees from the public to continue operations. The zoo also relies on a large number of volunteer recruits to aid in the management of its grounds and the animals residing there.

The zoo is 1 of the combined zoo and aquariums in Australia. The zoo has both Australian endemic species and introduced species including the largest collection of big cats in Australia, including, until recently, the only tigon in Australasia. The zoo is also involved in a number of breeding programs for endangered species.

The National Zoo and Aquarium plays host to many educational programs and specially designed tours for various groups; including school tours, family groups and children's birthday Tours. The zoo runs children's activities during ACT public school holiday periods and a hands-on educational program for children from 8–16 years of age on weekends during the term.

The zoo runs interactive Tours and animal experiences for visitors, including the ZooVenture Tour, the keeper for a day experience, Walk on the Wild Side, the Family Tour, Meet a Cheetah, plus daily information sessions and weekend Keeper Talks

== Tux the penguin ==
While visiting Canberra zoo, Linus Torvalds was bitten by a small penguin, providing the inspiration for Tux the Linux mascot.

== Animals ==
Australian mammals at the zoo include dingos, western grey kangaroos, swamp wallaby, parma wallaby, Tasmanian devils, koalas, and bare-nosed wombats - once including "Winnie", the oldest known wombat in captivity before her death in 2019.

The zoo maintains a collection of large cats including African lions (including white coat), Sumatran tigers, Bengal tigers, Sri Lankan leopards, cheetahs and servals. The primate species at the zoo are siamang, eastern black-and-white colobus, Francois' langurs, brown capuchin, black-capped squirrel monkey, common marmoset, pygmy marmoset, cotton-top tamarin, black-and-white ruffed lemurs and ring-tailed lemurs. Other mammals are Goodfellow's tree-kangaroos, spotted hyenas, African wild dogs, sun bears, red pandas, oriental small-clawed otters, meerkats, southern white rhinoceros, plains zebras, giraffes, common eland, blackbuck, Barbary sheep, wapiti, common fallow deer, alpacas, Cape crested porcupine, capybaras and red-rumped agoutis.

The Aquarium includes a variety of tropical marine and freshwater bony fish including Murray cod, Queensland groper, humphead wrasse, barramundi as well as giant moray, zebra moray. There are several shark species including blacktip reef sharks, leopard shark, zebra shark and epaulette shark.

Reptiles at the zoo include Komodo dragon, shingleback skink, blotched blue-tongued skink, green iguana, rhinoceros iguana, Taiwan beauty snake, corn snake, blood python, black-headed python, diamond python, Burmese python, reticulated python, boa constrictor, green anaconda, Indian star tortoise, pig-nosed turtle, Gulf Coast box turtle and American alligator. Amphibians at the zoo include magnificent tree frog.

Native Australian birds at the zoo include emu, little penguins, musk lorikeet, bush stone-curlew, tawny frogmouth, satin bowerbird, noisy pitta, orange-bellied parrot, white-browed woodswallow, plumed whistling duck, black swan and Cape Barren goose. Exotic birds include common ostrich, plum-headed parakeet, blue peafowl, golden pheasant, mandarin duck, helmeted guinea fowl, Egyptian goose and the endangered Java sparrow.

== History ==
The National Zoo & Aquarium incorporates the original "National Aquarium" which was opened on 31 May 1990. It was developed and owned by Geoff Da Deppo and at the time was the largest private tourism development in the ACT. The Aquarium consisted of approximately 30 different species, with its main feature being a large 1.5 million litre aquarium with an underwater walk through viewing tunnel which housed a huge range of marine life. This was reportedly the first of its type in the world and was manufactured by a local Canberra company. 11 large high-technology fish tanks built for World Expo 88 at Brisbane were also incorporated into the structure utilising a biological filter bank of a type never before used in Australia. It was at the time the largest closed synthetic salt water oceanarium in the Southern Hemisphere. The Aquarium also boasted a 300 seat restaurant and function area (The Barbary Coast Restaurant and Brasserie – later changed to Pirates Cove Restaurant) It was situated on around 18 acres of land which also incorporated a series of outdoor ponds and streams for trout farming.

The venture was never fully completed as envisaged and did not attract the wildly optimistic "up to 8000 visitors per day". The construction company suffered severe cash flow problems and in August 1990 was forced to put the Aquarium on the market. No sale eventuated and the Aquarium was placed in receivership in March 1991. The Aquarium continued trading under the Price Waterhouse receiver-manager who struggled to keep the business viable, incurring heavy weekly losses, and a bank deadline to find a buyer threatening its closure and a sell-off the assets. Requiring 200,000 to 300,000 customers a year to break even, it had never exceeded 70,000. In March 1992, after reported losses of investors of more than $12 m a prominent district grazier and businessman, Rod Hanstein purchased the property.

This phase of the facility lasted around five years. During this period, the new operator added several outdoor exhibits that consisted mainly of native wildlife. The large aquarium was converted from saltwater to freshwater to reduce costs. The overall theme of the facility changed in an attempt to meet the demands of a large Asian inbound tourist market into the ACT and offered an "Australian" experience that incorporated the wildlife park aspects as well as other activities such as fly fishing in the trout ponds, sheep shearing and boomerang throwing demonstrations. It also changed its name in 1993 to the National Aquarium – Australian Wildlife Sanctuary

In 1998, the facility was again up for sale and purchased by the Tindale family. Over the next two years they repaired and replaced many parts of the existing facility and enclosures as it had been poorly maintained for several years. This included the discovery that the major exhibit of the facility (the 1.5 million litre walk-through aquarium) had to be closed down permanently due to concrete cancer in the walls of the aquarium. It was modified to house a variety of animals over the next few years, including Snow Leopards, Sun Bears and Tigers. (This has since been turned into a rain forest display)

In 1999, the first significant enclosure was completed to house 3 Brown Bears that had to be re-homed after living for years in a private collection. In 2000, construction began on several big cat enclosures to house some retired circus lions, leopards, tiger and a pair of tigons (a cross between a lion a tiger). By 2001 the wildlife park was in full swing, at one stage having 14 new exhibits under construction that, when completed, would house more big cats, additional native animals, a variety of primate species as well as large ungulates such as zebra, antelope and giraffe. Upon completion the wildlife park changed its name to the "National Zoo & Aquarium". The upper levels of the Aquarium building (the restaurant & function area) were restructured to incorporate an onsite residence and a donut-shaped shark tank.

Between 2001 and 2003, the zoo battled Canberra's bush fires on two separate occasions, and the once established pine forest surrounding the zoo was turned to cinders. It was suggested that the zoo should potentially expand into adjoining land. Over the next 5 years, the zoo continued to develop as well as negotiate and design a potential future expansion.

The zoo developed a number of hands-on animal experiences for visitors, one of the first Australian zoos to do so. In 2004 the NZA won the Canberra Region Adventure Tourism award for the ZooVenture Tour.

In December 2014, the zoo opened its new development of onsite overnight accommodation, Jamala Wildlife Lodge. Jamala consists of a number of free-standing lodges within the zoo, including Jungle Bungalows, Giraffe Treehouses, and uShaka Lodge, which was formerly the onsite residence in the Aquarium building. By providing 5 star luxury accommodation and fine dining, the zoo placed itself in a niche compared to other available zoo overnight experiences, which only provide tented or cabin accommodation and buffet dining. Funds raised from Jamala are directed back into the zoo and towards a variety of local, Australian and world wide animal conservation charities and endangered species breeding programs. Since its opening, Jamala Wildlife Lodge has won variety of awards including Canberra Region Tourism Awards – Best Unique Accommodation 2017 and AHA National – Best Deluxe Accommodation 2017

In May 2017, the zoo officially opened their new open range section, effectively tripling the size of the zoo. The National Zoo & Aquarium is now one of the largest privately owned zoos in Australia and is an accredited member of the Zoo and Aquarium Association of Australasia (ZAA). It has the only inland aquarium exhibit in Australia.

== See also ==
- List of zoos
- List of zoos in Australia
