= Serpentarium Wildlife Park =

- Interactive map of Serpentarium Wildlife Park
- 41.316972°S 148.222417°E
- Date opened: 30 November 2019
- Location: St Helens, Tasmania, Australia
- No. of species: 20≈
- Owner: Matthew Lowndes
- Website: www.serpentarium.com.au

Serpentarium Wildlife Park is a small reptile park located in St Helens, Tasmania, Australia. The park was established by Matthew Lowndes as a facility to further the general publics education of reptiles through viewing and offering some hands on encounters for visitors with some of the reptiles. The park includes a nursery for incubating and raising captive bred reptiles, a reptile husbandry library, a reptile research station with microscopes and a collection of minerals and cultural artefacts, and a café.

The snake species at the park all belong to the python family and include Children's python , black-headed python, boa constrictor, carpet pythons, jungle and northwestern), central carpet python, green anaconda, reticulated python, scrub python, spotted python and Burmese python. Other reptiles kept at the park are blotched blue-tongued lizard, eastern bearded dragon, freshwater crocodile, lace monitor, and star tortoises. Rio, a blue-and-gold macaw, and eastern grey kangaroos are also residents of the park.
