= Altina Wildlife Park =

- Interactive map of Altina Wildlife Park
- 34.618643°S 146.058739°E
- Date opened: 2004
- Location: Darlington Point, New South Wales, Australia
- Land area: 207 hectares
- Memberships: ZAA
- Owner: Altin family
- Website: www.altinawildlife.com

Altina Wildlife Park is a zoo situated in Darlington Point, New South Wales, Australia. The zoo specialises in the conservation of endangered species and features a diverse range of Australian native and exotic animals. It operates horse-drawn cart tours and offers behind the scenes wildlife encounters.

== List of species ==
- Addax
- African lion (including white-coated)
- African wild dog
- Alpaca
- American bison
- Asian water buffalo
- Banteng
- Barbary sheep
- Bare-nosed wombat
- Black-and-white ruffed lemur
- Blackbuck
- Brown capuchin monkey
- Capybara
- Common fallow deer
- Common red deer
- Cotton-top tamarin
- Dingo
- Dromedary camel
- Emperor tamarin
- Giraffe
- Golden lion tamarin
- Himalayan tahr
- Indian hog deer
- Javan rusa deer
- Maned wolf
- Meerkat
- Nyala
- Ostrich
- Plains zebra
- Przewalski's horse
- Red panda
- Ring-tailed lemur
- Scimitar-horned oryx
- Scottish highland cattle
- Serval
- Southern eland
- Southern white rhinoceros
- Spotted hyena
- Tasmanian devil
- Wapiti deer
- Waterbuck
- White-tufted marmoset
- Yellow-footed rock wallaby

In October 2023, two black-and-white ruffed lemurs (Varecia variegata) were paired for potential breeding. However, in early December, the female gave birth to three babies (2x M, 1x F), which was a complete surprise to staff. As the gestation is longer than their pairing, the female had been pregnant before being transported from Darling Downs Zoo in Queensland, and DNA testing will reveal the identity of the father.
