= Alexandra Park Zoo =

- Interactive map of Alexandra Park Zoo
- 24.865833°S 152.343056°E
- Date opened: 1911
- Location: Quay St, Bundaberg West, Queensland, Australia
- Land area: 2.115 ha (5.23 acres) ≈
- Website: www.discoverbundaberg.com.au/alexandra-park-zoo

Alexandra Park Zoo is a small zoo located in Bundaberg West, Queensland, Australia. Animal species at the zoo include cotton-top tamarin, dingo, swamp wallaby, parma wallaby, spotted-tailed quoll, lace monitor, freckled monitor, eastern bearded dragon, land mullet, coastal carpet python, brown tree snake, white-throated snapping turtle, emu, red-tailed black cockatoo, sulphur-crested cockatoo, eclectus parrot, princess parrot and red-winged parrot.

The zoo was home to a female radiated tortoise named Torty who was over 136 years old when she died on 20 February 1984.

The zoo is open daily from 9:30am–4:30pm.
