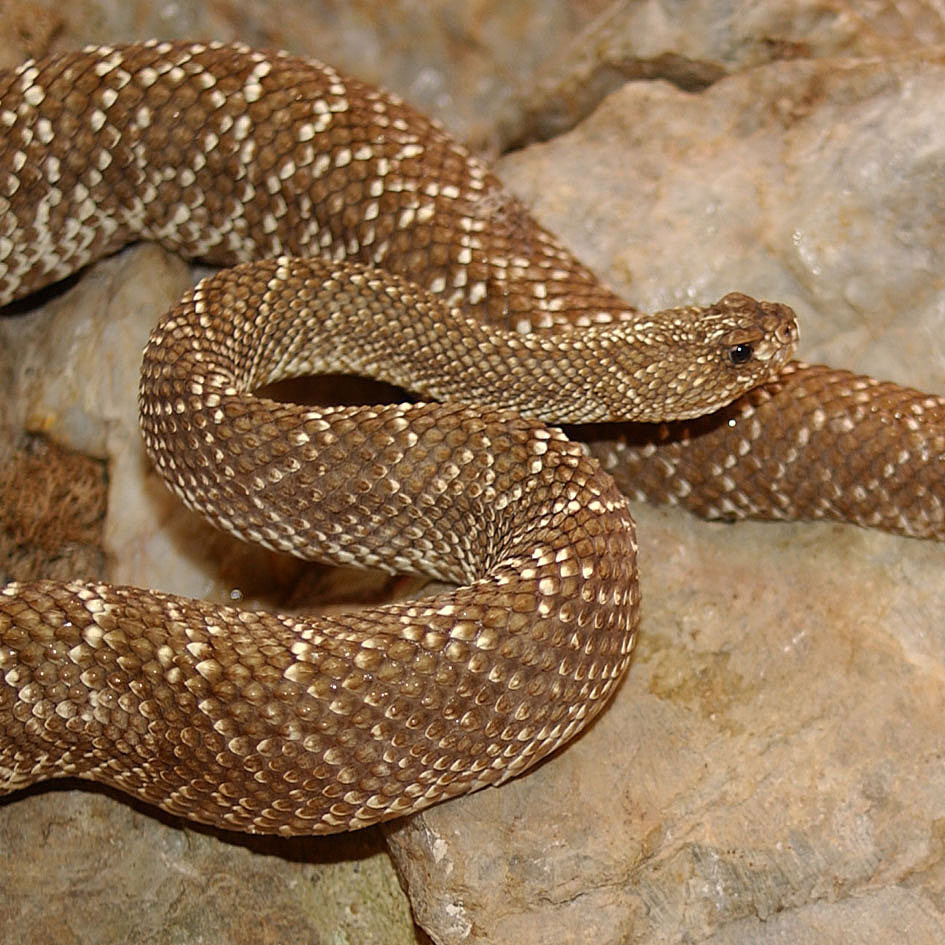

Scientific classification
- Kingdom: Animalia
- Phylum: Chordata
- Class: Reptilia
- Order: Squamata
- Suborder: Serpentes
- Family: Viperidae
- Genus: Crotalus
- Species: C. vegrandis

Binomial name
- Crotalus vegrandis Klauber, 1941

Synonyms
- Crotalus vegrandis - Klauber, 1941; Crotalus durissus vegrandis - Klauber, 1956; Crotalus (Crotalus) vegrandis - Peters & Orejas-Miranda, 1970; Crotalus vegrandis - McCranie, 1984; Crotalus d[urissus]. vegrandis - Campbell & Lamar, 1989

= Crotalus vegrandis =

Species of snake

Crotalus vegrandis, or the Uracoan Rattlesnake, is a venomous pit viper that is endemic to Venezuela.

== Description ==
Klauber (1997) gives two maximum lengths: 636 mm for the largest measured specimen, and 684 mm as the greatest value from a report believed to be reliable. Its colors range from olive green to rust brown, with levels of gray; scales can also be white.

Crotalus vegrandis has an estimated lifespan of 15-20 years.

The venom of the Uracoan Rattlesnake is dangerous, and can cause a number of symptoms including bleeding, coagulopathy, neurotoxicity, and hypotension (low blood pressure), all of which are common among rattlesnakes including those from the Crotalus genus. However, this species is unusual due to its venom causing both hemorrhage and neurotoxicity; most species do not display both characteristics. Research of C. vegrandis venom could lead to developments in antivenom.

C. vegrandis is nocturnal, and relies on lizards for sustenance.

C. vegrandis has been noted for having an unusual rattle. Many other rattlesnakes in the genus Crotalus have long, drawn-out rattles; the rattle of this species has been described as a "fine vibrator noise".

== Geographic range ==
The species only occurs in its type locality of the Maturín Savannah, near the Uracoa Municipality, within the state of Monagas. As such, it mostly lives in semiarid savannahs among plateaus. The sandy soil present in its habitat could be responsible for the red and gold colors of its scales. It is a minority in that it belongs exclusively to this biome; it does not reside in other areas.

Birds are common predators of the species. It also faces threats from habitat loss, due to the habitat's specific traits and already-minimal expanse.
