= Nulkaba, New South Wales =

Nulkaba
- Suburb
- Coordinates: 32°48′6″S 151°21′49″E
- Country: Australia
- State: New South Wales
- Region: Hunter
- City: City of Cessnock
- LGA: City of Cessnock
- Location: 161 km (100 mi) N of Sydney; 50 km (31 mi) W of Newcastle; 3 km (1.9 mi) N of Cessnock

Government
  - State electorate: Cessnock
  - Federal division: Hunter

Population
  - Total: 1,208 (2006 census)
- Time zone: UTC+10 (AEST)
  - Summer (DST): UTC+11 (AEDT)
- Postcode: 2325
- County: Northumberland
- Parish: Pokolbin
- Mean max temp: 24.5 °C (76.1 °F)
- Mean min temp: 11.3 °C (52.3 °F)
- Annual rainfall: 759.2 mm (29.89 in)
Suburbs around Nulkaba
Pokolbin	Lovedale	Lovedale
Pokolbin	Nulkaba	Lovedale
Pokolbin	Cessnock	Lovedale

Nulkaba is a locality in the city of Cessnock, in the Hunter Region of New South Wales, Australia.

== History ==
As early as 1829, land was set aside to build a church and school in the area now known as Nulkaba. St. Luke's Anglican Church was built in 1872, and the first school in 1877. "The Village of Pokolbin" was laid out in 1884–85, but was referred to as Cessnock, until that name came to be applied to what is now considered Cessnock, south of the village, and Nulkaba was used instead. The name of Nulkaba was officially adopted in 1927.

== Education ==
Nulkaba Public School is located in Nulkaba at 5 O'Connors Road, and was opened in 1926. The school has just over 400 students, with exceptional academic and sporting results from the many children.
