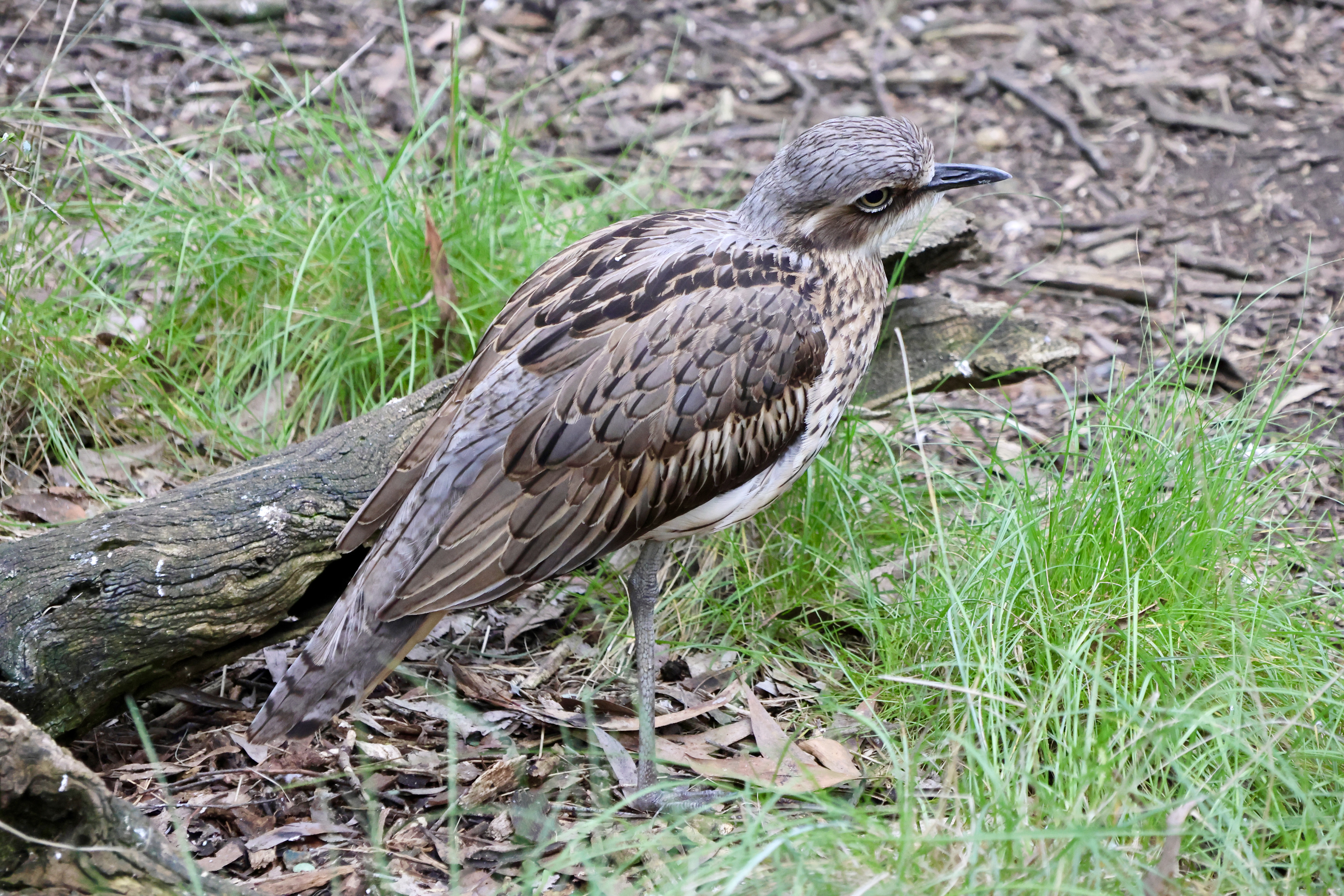

Conservation status
- Least Concern (IUCN 3.1)

Scientific classification
- Kingdom: Animalia
- Phylum: Chordata
- Class: Aves
- Order: Charadriiformes
- Family: Burhinidae
- Genus: Burhinus
- Species: B. grallarius

Binomial name
- Burhinus grallarius (Latham, 1801)
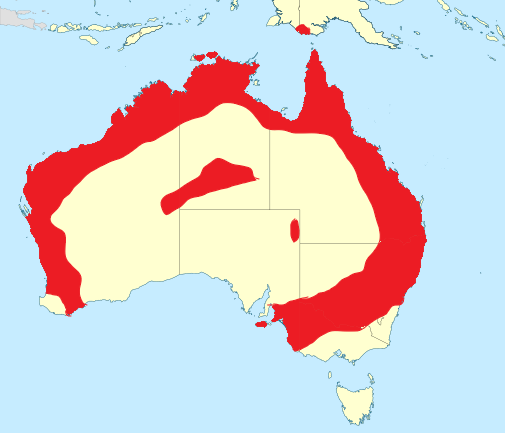
- resident range

Synonyms
- Charadius grallarius Latham, 1801 Burhinus magnirostris (Latham, 1801)

= Bush stone-curlew =

Species of bird

The bush stone-curlew or bush thick-knee (Burhinus grallarius, obsolete name Burhinus magnirostris) is a large, ground-dwelling bird endemic to Australia. Its favoured habitat is open plains and woodlands, where it stalks slowly at night in search of invertebrates such as insects. Its grey-brown coloration is distinguished by dark streaks, its eyes are large and legs are long. It is capable of flight, but relies on the camouflage of its plumage to evade detection during the day; the bush curlew adopts a rigid posture when it becomes aware of an observer. Both sexes care for two eggs laid on the bare ground, usually sited near bush in a shaded position or next to a fallen branch.

== Taxonomy ==
The bush stone-curlew was first described by English ornithologist John Latham in 1801 under the binomial name Charadrius grallarius. Latham published three names simultaneously; however, the seniority of C. grallarius follows the publication of the names in John Gould's Birds of Australia in 1845.

Until a revision determining the priority of names assigned to this species, ornithologists cited the description under the epithet B. magnirostris. Descriptions of subspecies were published by Gregory Mathews in 1912, B. m. rufescens and B. m. broomei describing specimens collected in western Australia and B. m. ramsayi collected in the east at Queensland. These descriptions are recognised as synonymous with B. grallarius.

A species of the widely distributed family Burhinidae, also represented in Australia by the beach stone-curlew Esacus magnirostris, it is a terrestrial forager of semiarid inland environments related to the shorebirds and waders of the order Charadriiformes.

=== Etymology ===
Bush stone-curlew is the common name almost exclusively used for this species within Australia, its natural range. A name used by the indigenous peoples of Western Australia, wee-lo, was reported by John Gilbert and published by Gould in 1845. Later authorities included this name as current at the Northwest Cape and Southwest Australia, the similar wee-loo at Pallinup River, and welojabbin, also in the southwest, and windoo at a district in the western interior. Up to the early 20th century, the name southern stone-plover was used in settler texts. International sources may use the name bush thick-knee, using one of the common names for the genus Burhinus. Other common names that have been cited as used for this species are southern stone-curlew and scrub stone-curlew.

== Distribution and habitat ==
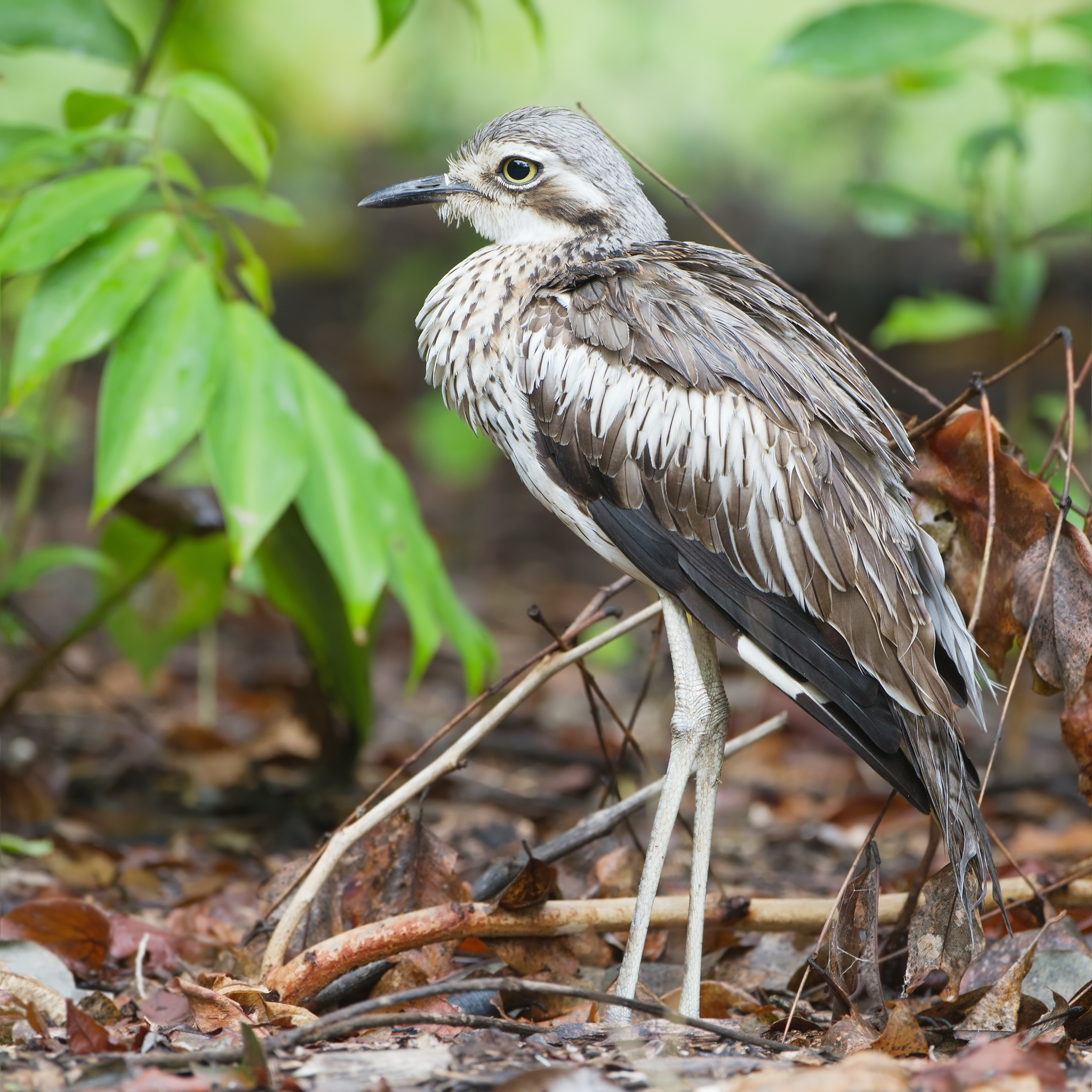
Adult at Cairns, northern Queensland

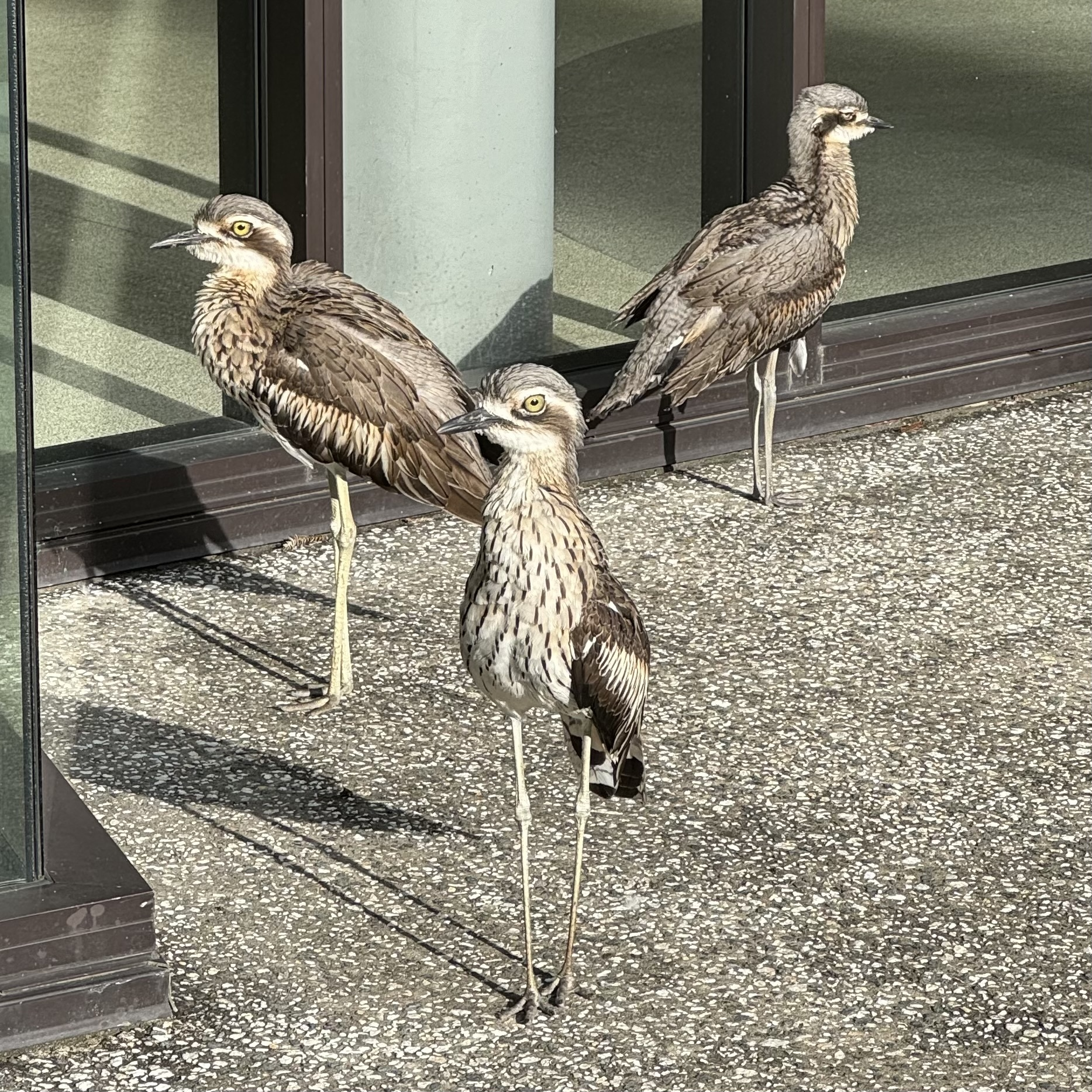
In an urban environment, in Brisbane

The bush stone-curlew has a broad habitat preference, but is rarely seen in rainforest, arid desert, or urban or agricultural regions. The species is found in open forest, eucalyptus woodland, rainforest edges, grassy plains, arid scrubland, and along inland watercourses. They are not a migratory species, although weather conditions may cause them to relocate to another site in a local area. It is a common species around the cities of Brisbane, Cairns, and Townsville of Australia's northeast, but is not found around urban areas in the south of its range. It can be found throughout Australia apart from the West Australian coast and Tasmania. It is still abundant in the tropical and subtropical north, but has become very rare in the less fertile south where it was once common.

Historical records of the species' occurrence in southwest Australia indicate it was common, sometimes abundant, but the population greatly declined in this region during the 20th century. The cause of its extirpation is largely attributed to the introduction of the red fox Vulpes vulpes. The threat from predation by cats is noted as sometimes absent where the fox had already established itself. Attempts to control another exotic pest, the European rabbit, were also a threatening factor to this species succumbing to control methods of water poisoning and inadvertent capture in rabbit traps. Bush curlew's distribution range included most of the mainland of the Australian continent, although this has become reduced by around 90%, and is also found on offshore and nearby islands. A very small population is recorded breeding at a site in southern New Guinea. The curlew was reported to sometimes find protection from foxes by residing near rural properties, receiving the consideration of farmers and defended by their dogs. Young birds have been known to become partially domesticated at rural properties.

Agricultural activity sometimes favoured the local populations; Frederick Whitlock noted in 1903 that the bush stone-curlew gained access to open water and favoured the partial clearing of forest where remnant shrubland remained. However, the dramatic decline in former strongholds that were converted to European farming practices was recorded in the mid-20th century.

== Description ==
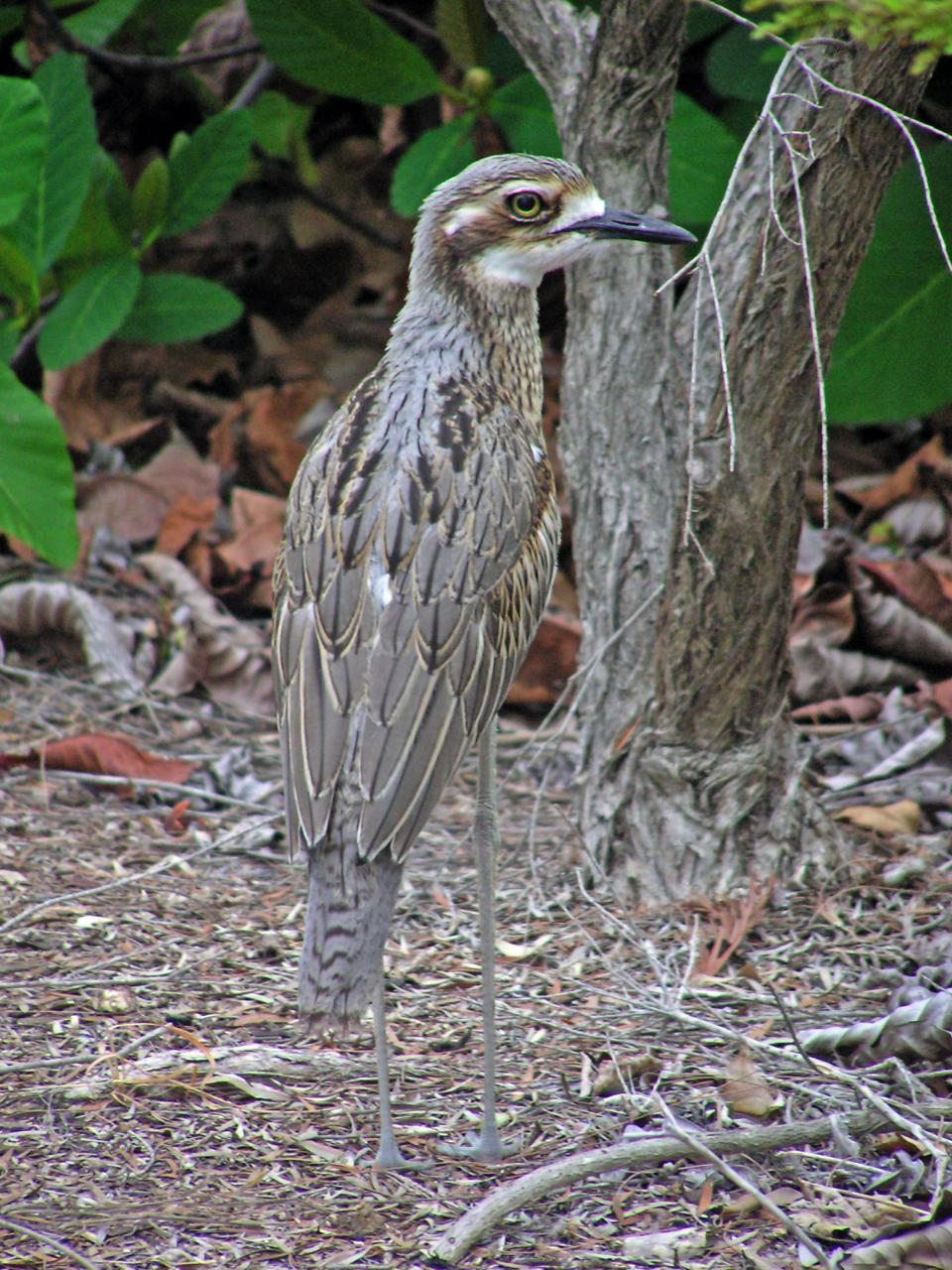
Displaying camouflage, in Darwin

A species of Burhinus, a genus of large-eyed and long-legged terrestrial foragers known as thick-knees, it is slender in form and a grey and brown colour with distinctive markings. The bird has conspicuous dark streaks over the buff and greyish white feathers of the upperparts and spotted markings on the wings. The plumage at lower side of the bird is also strongly streaked with dark brown over white and buff feathers. The total length of the species, including a bill around 45 mm and tail 180 mm, is 550 mm; the wingspan approaches 1 m across. Black flight feathers on the wing reveal a light buff patch when extended, and the plumage has a light area at the shoulder. The head is distinguished by a band of dark feathers over the eye and down the neck, and a buff colour at the forehead and brow over the eye. The iris is bright yellow; bare skin near the eye is black. The long legs of the species are an olive-green colour, and the bill is darkish in tone.

The sexes are similar, with juveniles displaying a paler plumage that otherwise resembles the adults.

The coloration of the eggshell is generally a stone grey with brownish blotching, although this is variable and often matches the environment to provide camouflage. Size of the egg is also variable, on average it is 53 × 39 mm, yet differences in nearby nests or between the two eggs of the same brood are recorded.

Another species of the family, the beach stone-curlew (also known as a wee-lo), is distinguished by its plumage and larger bill and is only found at the coast. Confusion with the nightjars is possible, but the species of Caprimulgus are smaller and fly in a different manner.

== Behaviour ==
Like most stone-curlews, it is mainly nocturnal and specialises in hunting small grassland animals; frogs, spiders, insects, molluscs, crustaceans, snakes, lizards, and small mammals are all taken, mostly gleaned or probed from soft soil or rotting wood; a few seeds or tubers are also consumed, particularly in drought years. Birds usually forage individually or in pairs over a large home range, particularly on moonlit nights.

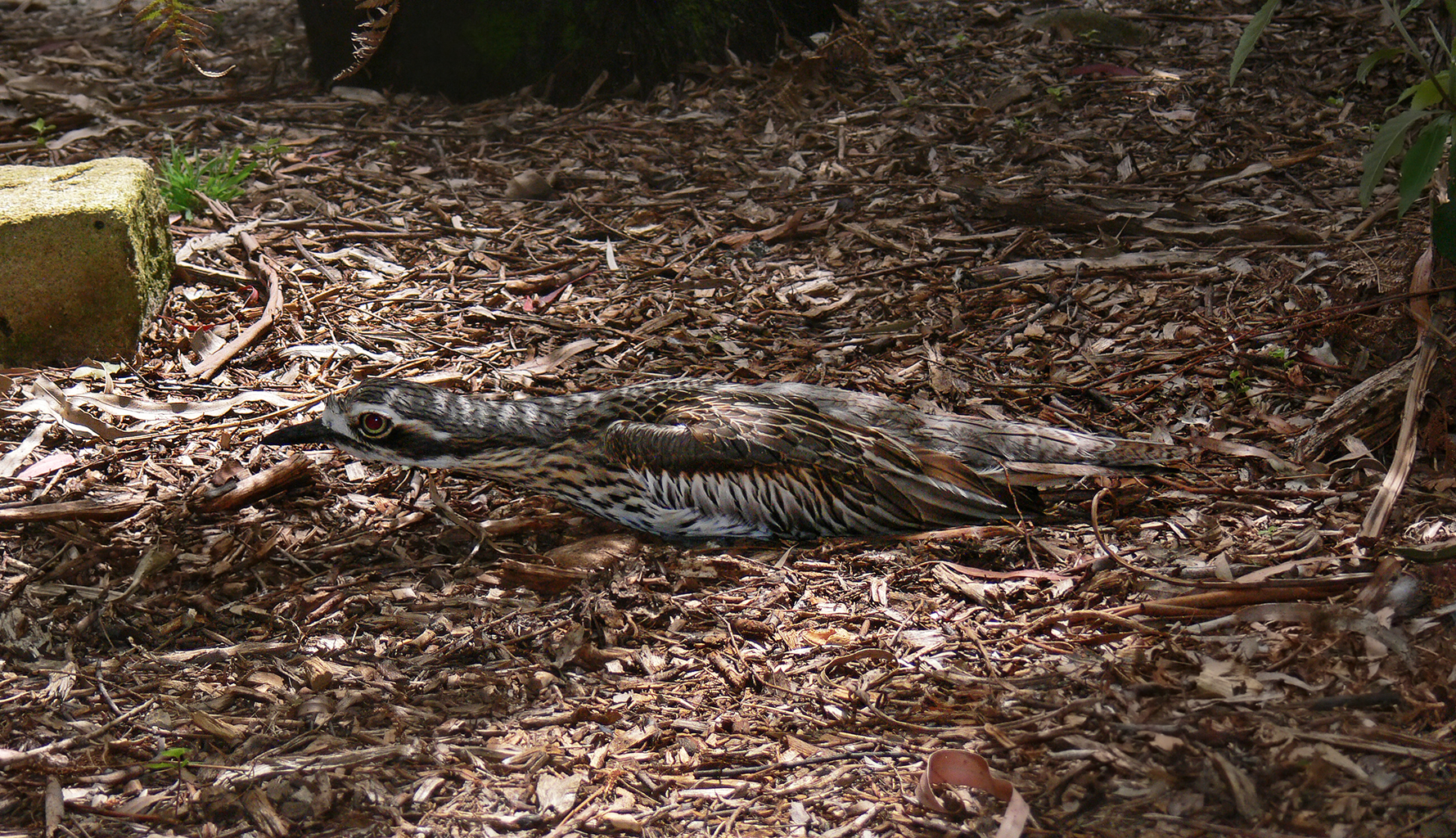
A cryptic motionless adult

During the day, bush stone-curlews tend to remain inactive, sheltering amongst tall grass or the shade of shrubs and trees, relying on their cryptic plumage to protect them from predators. When disturbed, they freeze motionless, often in odd-looking postures. For visual predators such as raptors and humans, this works well, but it serves little purpose with animals that hunt by scent such as foxes, dingoes, or goannas. Approaching the camouflaged individual does not dissuade it from this behaviour, maintaining the rigid posture even if handled. If moving from a disturbance, they crouch and walk stealthily into vegetation, only attempting to fly if vigorously pursued.

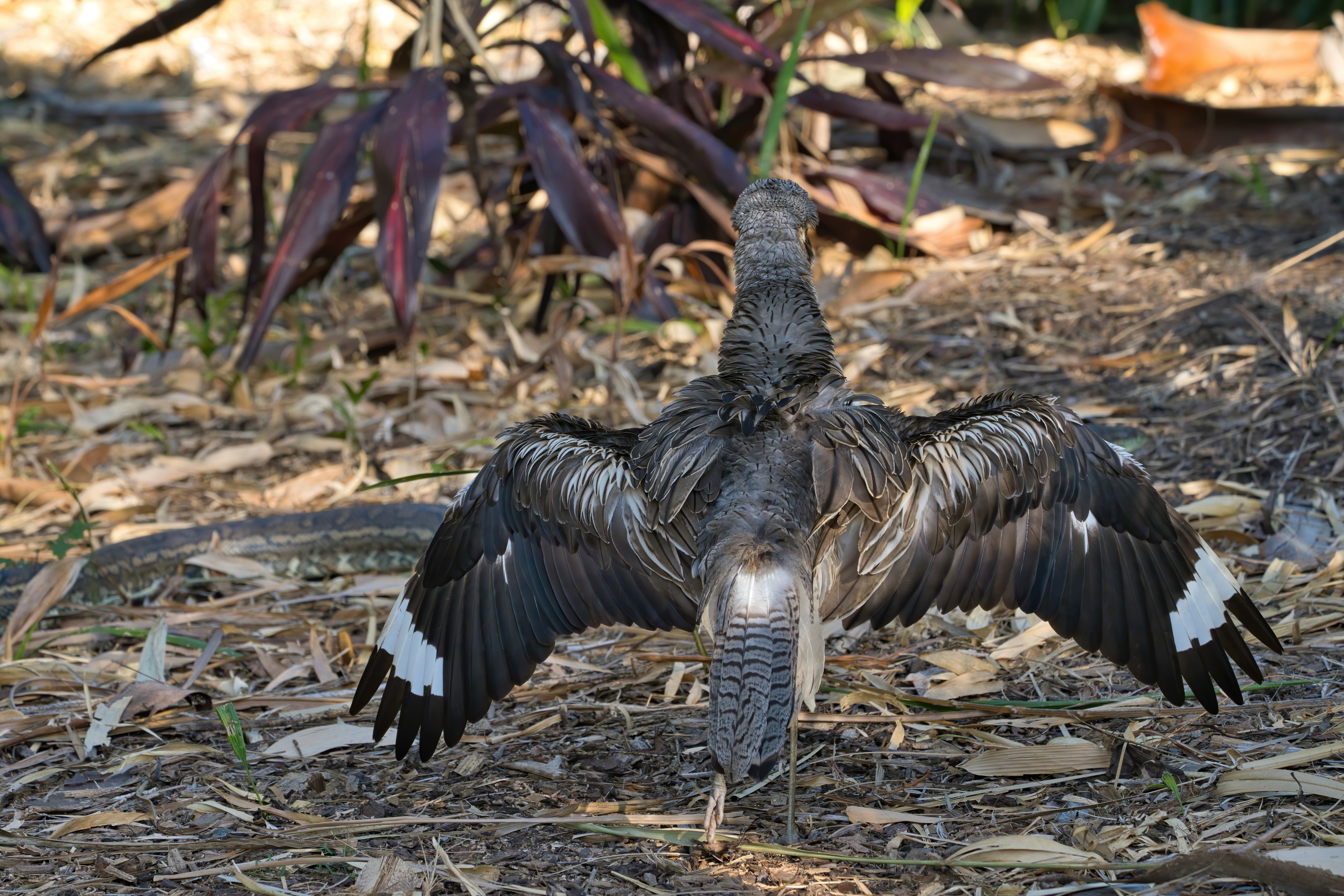
Threat posture against a carpet python

Despite their habit of freezing motionless, they are sure-footed, fast, and agile on the ground, and although they seldom fly during daylight hours, their flight is rapid and direct on long, broad wings.

=== Vocalization ===
This stone-curlew's voice is loud and can be heard at a great distance. The call of "weeloo" has an eerie and plaintive tone and is a familiar sound of the night in the Australian bush. The frequency of calls increases when weather conditions are changing, especially when rain is approaching an area. Several individuals may join their voices in chorus, greatly intensifying the extraordinary quality of their nocturnal calling. The bush stone-curlew is probably heard more than it is seen. Its call sounds like a wail or a scream in the night. When scared, it screeches – a sound similar to the screech of a possum. A field report from Brookton, Western Australia, noted that their call was heard in response to the cry of possums shot by hunters. When threatened (presumably in the presence of a nest), they may raise their wings wide and high in an impressive threat posture and emit a loud, hoarse hissing noise.

=== Reproduction ===
The bush curlew is sometimes recorded in flocks, but when the breeding season occurs, the number of birds in a locality is usually just a mating pair. Like other ground-nesting birds, the females only select a site to lay the eggs and provide no other adornment to the nest; care of the site is performed by both parents. The brooding parent discreetly moves from the site if disturbed in the first few days of incubation but remains to defend an egg at a later stage of development. The parent adopts its frozen posture and lays over the eggs in an attempt to hide them. An egg that has been discovered by an intruder may be moved a short distance away.

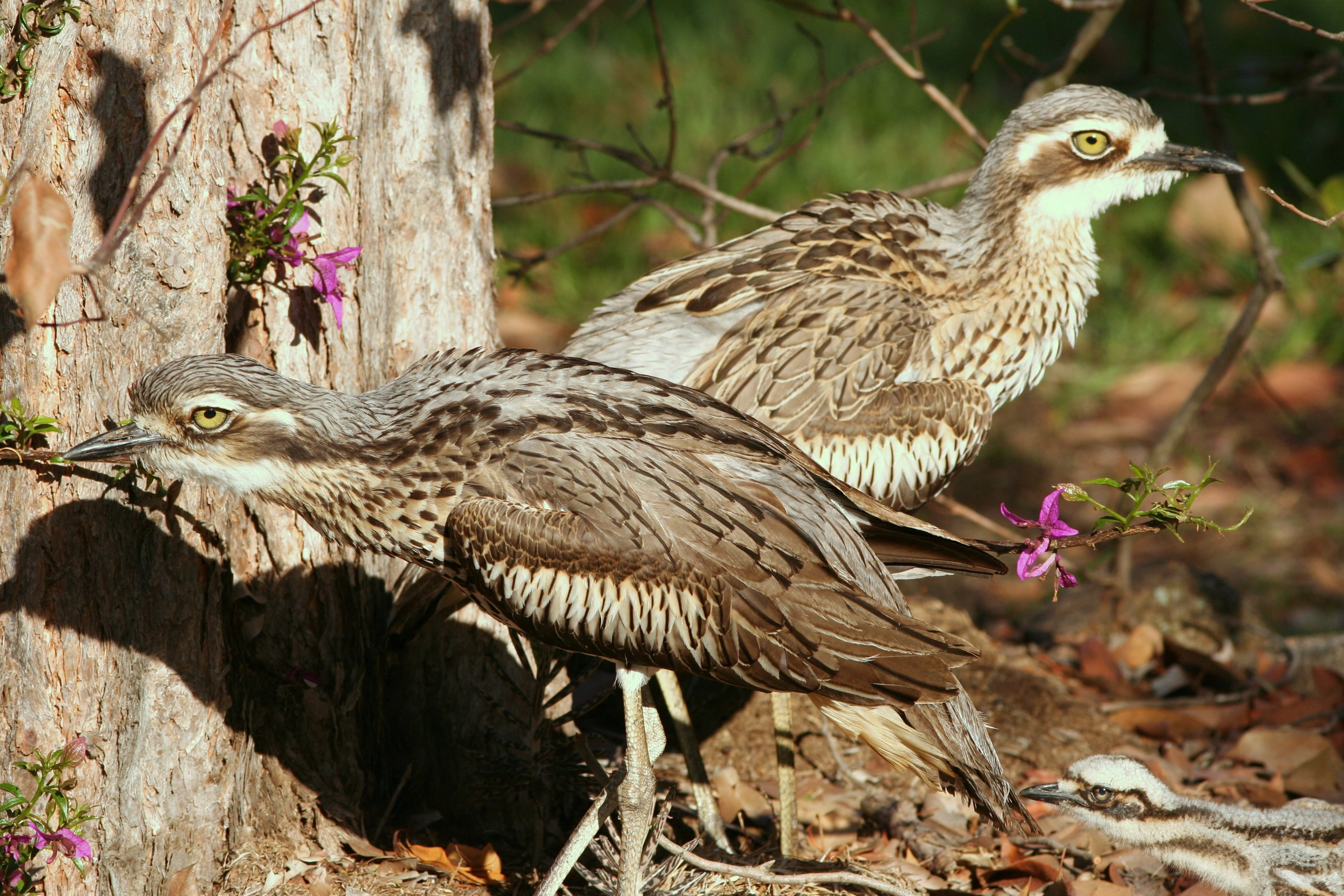
Breeding pair

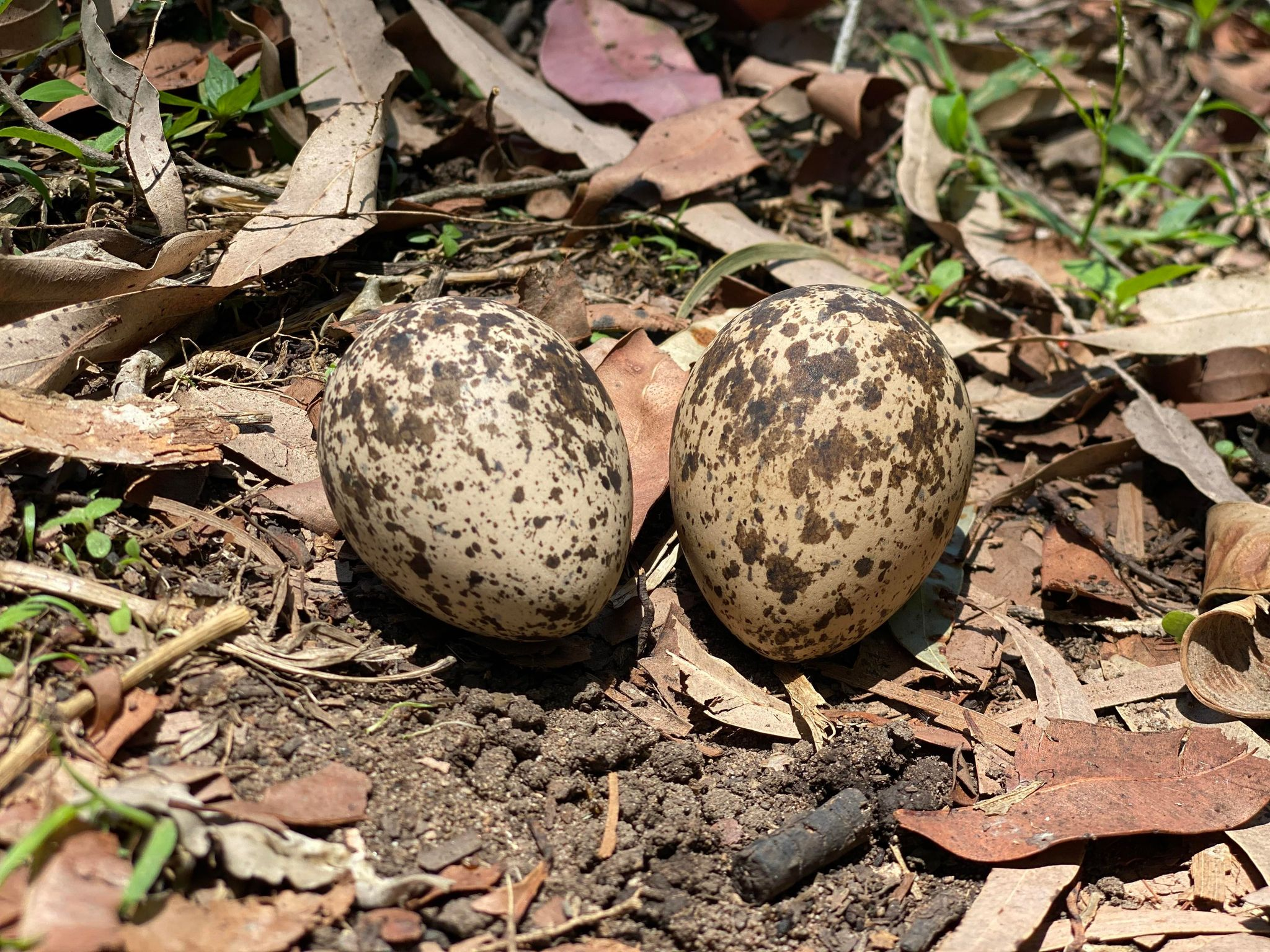
Eggs

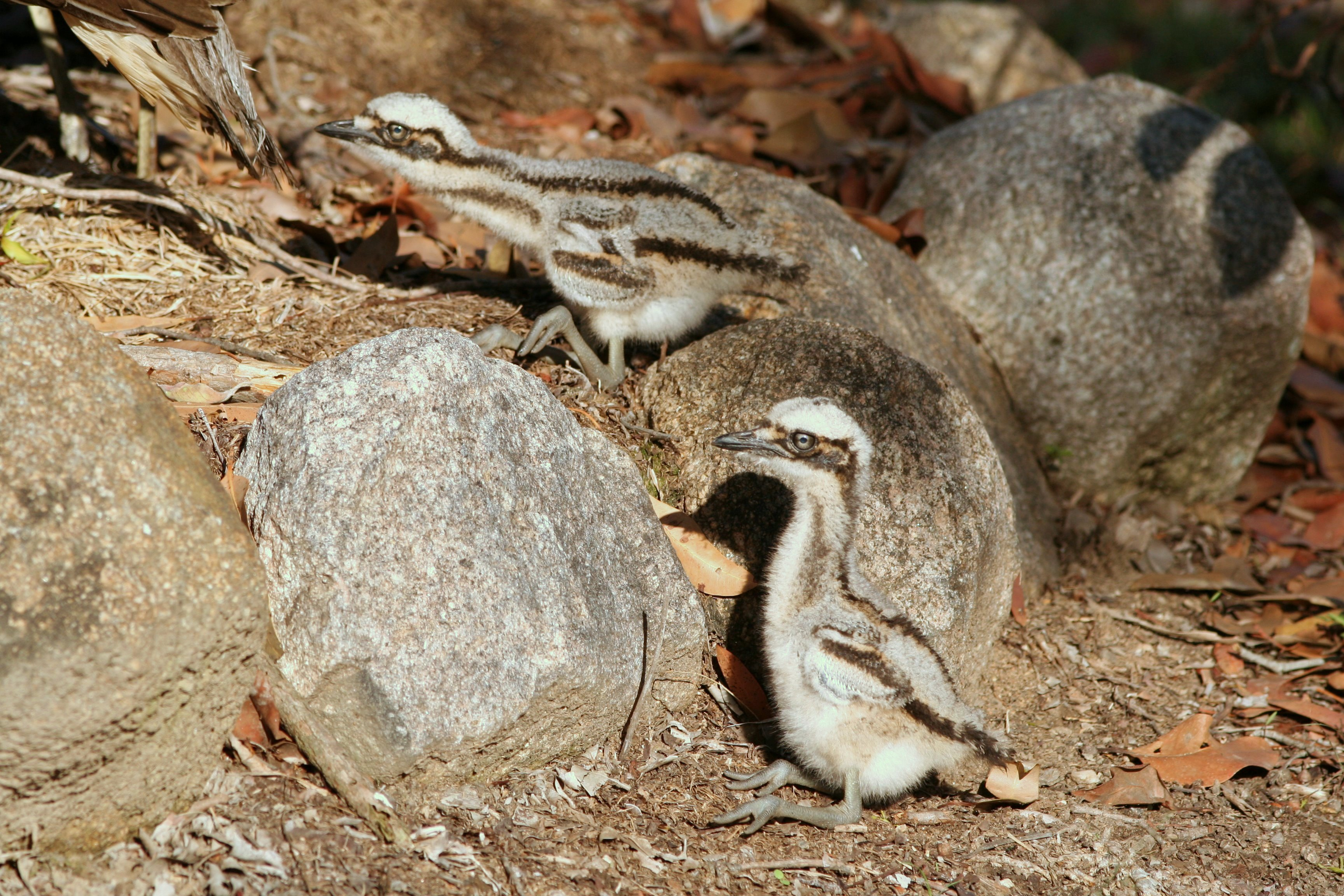
Chicks in cryptic pose

== Conservation status ==
Adult and young, Rush Creek, SE Queensland

Bush stone-curlews remain reasonably common in the north of Australia, but have become rare in the less fertile south. Many experts believe that fox predation is a prime factor in their decline, although some areas remain where foxes are common, yet the bush stone-curlew population remains healthy, so the true causes remain uncertain. Large-scale habitat destruction and fragmentation has undoubtedly been important, and may well be the major factor, although some evidence suggests that the species favours agricultural land and some urban areas with patches of remnant native vegetation over intact areas of vegetation.

Starting in 2014, bush stone-curlews have been reintroduced to a protected area in Mulligans Flat Woodland Sanctuary in Canberra using a combination of hard- and soft-release strategies.

The assessment noted in the IUCN Red List is not threatened, revising an earlier listing of near threatened with extinction. The population is declining and estimated at 10,000 to 15,000 individuals in 2016. Historical declines recorded during colonisation of Australia are thought to have abated in the 32 years (three generations) prior to the IUCN's 2016 assessment.

The bush stone-curlew is not listed as threatened on the Environment Protection and Biodiversity Conservation Act 1999. It is common in Queensland, and not considered to be regionally threatened there. In New South Wales, it is considered endangered under the Threatened Species Conservation Act 1995. It is listed as "vulnerable" in South Australia on the National Parks and Wildlife Act 1972, and listed as "threatened" on the Victorian Flora and Fauna Guarantee Act 1988. Under this act, an action statement for the recovery and future management of this species has been prepared. On the 2007 advisory list of threatened vertebrate fauna in Victoria, this species is listed as endangered.

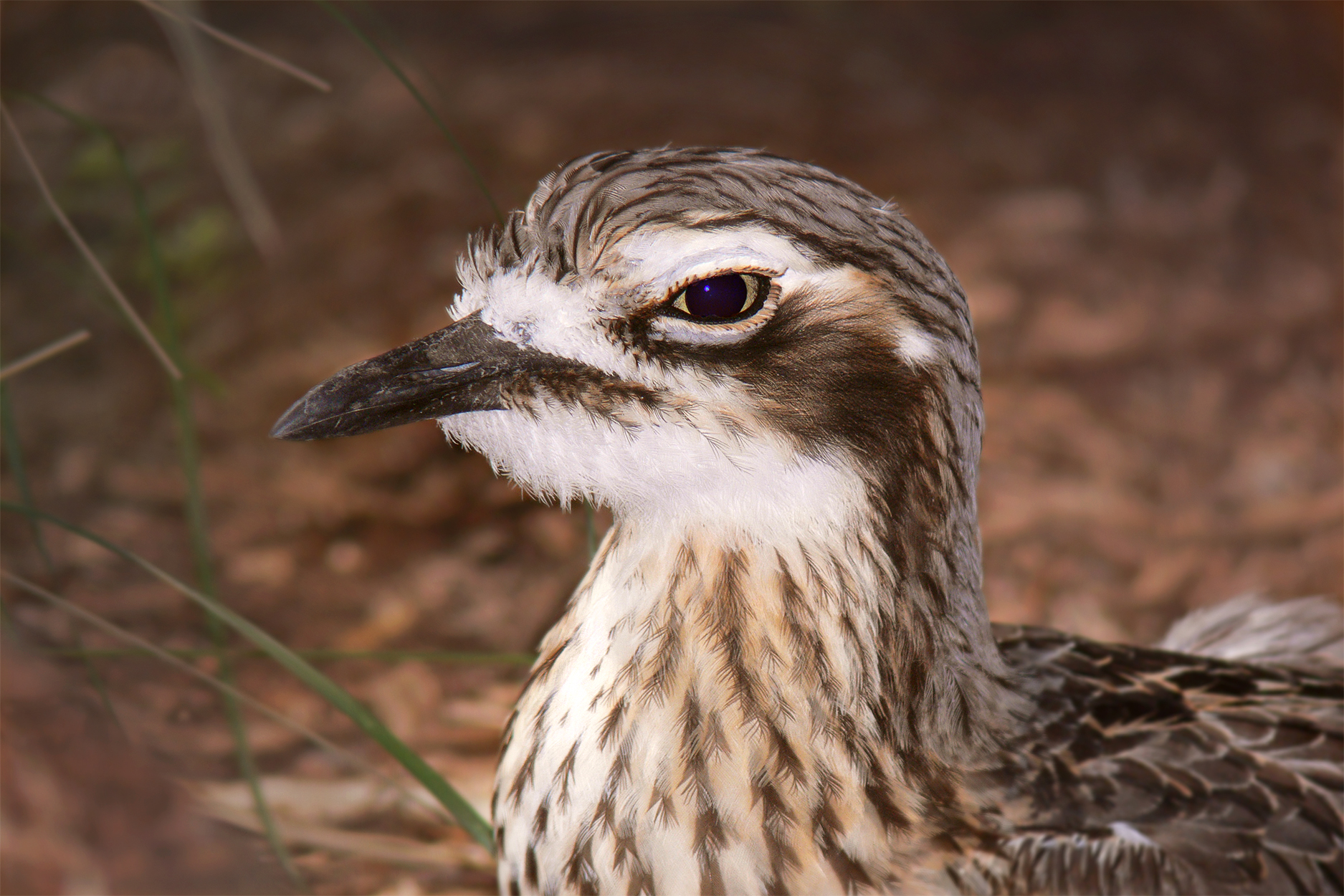
Adult facial markings

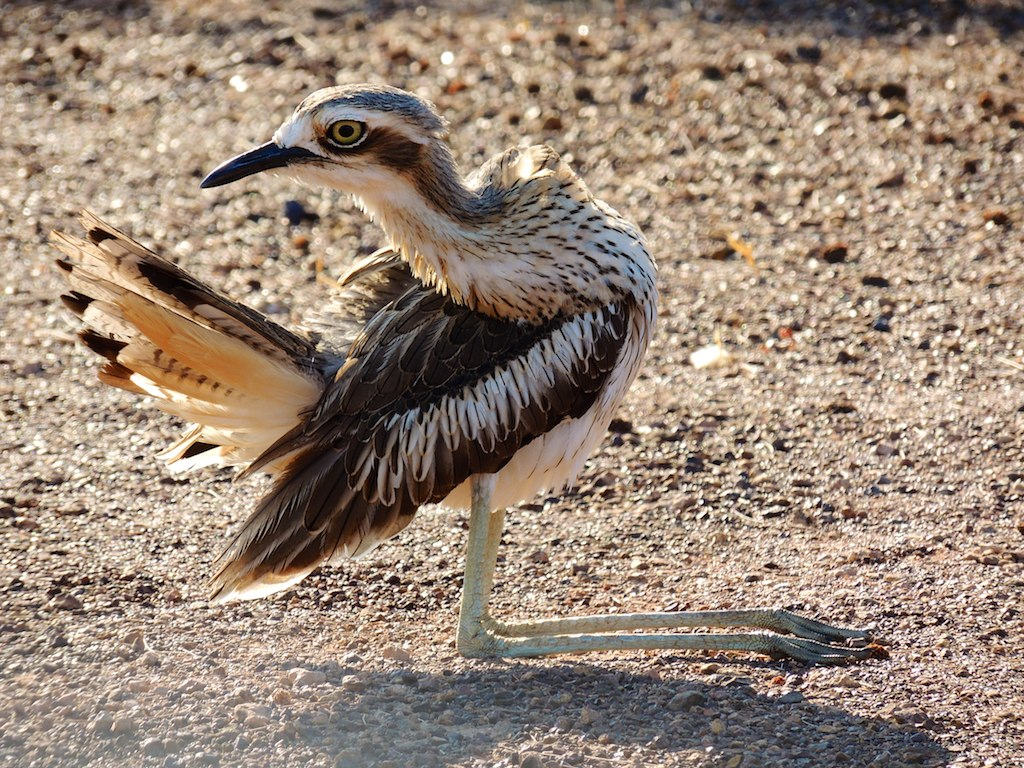
Preening in crouched position
