= Zoo and Aquarium Association =

Australasian not-for-profit organisation

Zoo and Aquarium Association (ZAA)
- Founded: 1991
- Type: National not-for-profit organisation
- Purpose: Zoo and aquarium accreditation and advocacy
- Location: Sydney, Australia
- Region served: Australia, New Zealand, and the South Pacific
- Method: Accreditation
- Website: zooaquarium.org.au

The Zoo and Aquarium Association (ZAA) Australasia was established in 1991. Its vision is to create "Positive Outcomes for Wildlife and People."

The organisation operates throughout the Australasia region (Australia, New Zealand, Papua New Guinea and the Pacific).

== Wildlife conservation ==
Under the ZAA's Species Management Program member institutions co-operate to plan and manage the populations of wildlife they hold in ways that improve their sustainability and their conservation value.

The ZAA's Wildlife Conservation Fund provides critical funding to projects that aim to protect and conserve threatened species in the wild.

The ZAA holds workshops, meetings and conferences for zoo and aquarium specialists.

As an association, ZAA brings its members together to facilitate shared knowledge and continuous improvement in conservation, welfare, biosecurity, science, research, social and community programs.

== Accreditation Program ==
Using the Five Domains Model, ZAA grants accreditation to zoos and aquariums that demonstrate a commitment to positive animal welfare.

Australian state and territory laws require zoos and aquariums to meet minimum standards for animal welfare. In New Zealand, these standards are enforced by the government under the Animal Welfare Act 1999. The ZAA Accreditation Program aims to raise the animal welfare standards of accredited zoos and aquariums to surpass existing legal standards.

== Capacity building for zoos and aquariums ==
ZAA acts as a focal point for unifying the efforts of zoos and aquariums in contributing to wildlife conservation. ZAA publishes news, guidelines and management plans for zoos and aquariums.

== Governance and Operations ==
The ZAA is overseen by a Board elected by its members. ZAA's headquarters are located in Sydney, Australia and are hosted by Taronga Zoo. The ZAA New Zealand office is hosted by Wellington Zoo in New Zealand.

== Membership ==
The ZAA offers a number of different membership options.

- Regional zoo/aquarium membership
- International zoo/aquarium subscriber
- Business membership
- Individual membership
