= Adelaide Zoo =

Zoo in Adelaide, Australia

- Interactive map of Adelaide Zoo
- 34°54′51″S 138°36′21″E
- Date opened: 23 May 1883; 143 years ago
- Location: Adelaide, South Australia, Australia
- Land area: 8 hectares (20 acres)
- No. of animals: 3,000+
- No. of species: 300
- Memberships: Zoo and Aquarium Association, World Association of Zoos and Aquariums
- Website: www.adelaidezoo.com.au

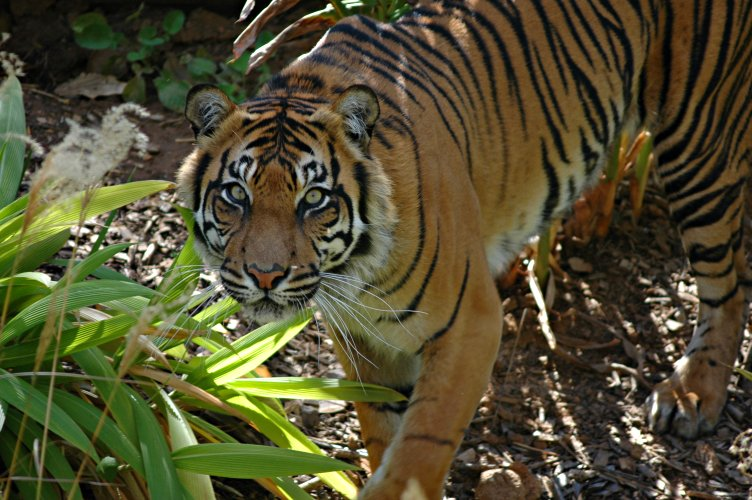
Sumatran tiger

Adelaide Zoo is a zoo in Adelaide, Australia. It is the country's second oldest zoo (after Melbourne Zoo) opening in 1883, and is operated on a non-profit basis. It is located in the parklands just north of the city centre of Adelaide, South Australia. It is administered by the Royal Zoological Society of South Australia Incorporated (trading as Zoos South Australia or Zoos SA), which is a full institutional member of the Zoo and Aquarium Association and the World Association of Zoos and Aquariums, and which also administers the Monarto Safari Park near Murray Bridge.

The zoo houses over 3,000 animals comprising 250 native and exotic species. The zoo's most recent enclosures are in the second phase of the South-East Asia exhibit, known as Immersion, providing visitors with the experience of walking through the jungle, with Sumatran tigers and Sumatran orangutans seemingly within reach. Five buildings within the zoo have been listed as state heritage places on the South Australian Heritage Register, including the front entrance on Frome Road and the former Elephant House. The zoo is also a botanical garden and the grounds contain significant exotic and native flora, including a Moreton Bay fig planted in 1877.

The zoo is notably home to the Southern Hemisphere's largest giant panda centre, which opened in December 2009. It is home to two pandas called Xing Qiu and Yi Lan, who arrived in 2024 to replace Wang Wang and Funi who lived at the zoo until November 2024. Wang Wang and Funi were notorious for their failed breeding attempts. Xing Qiu and Yi Lan live as a male and female pair, alongside two Red pandas called Ravi and Maiya.

== History ==
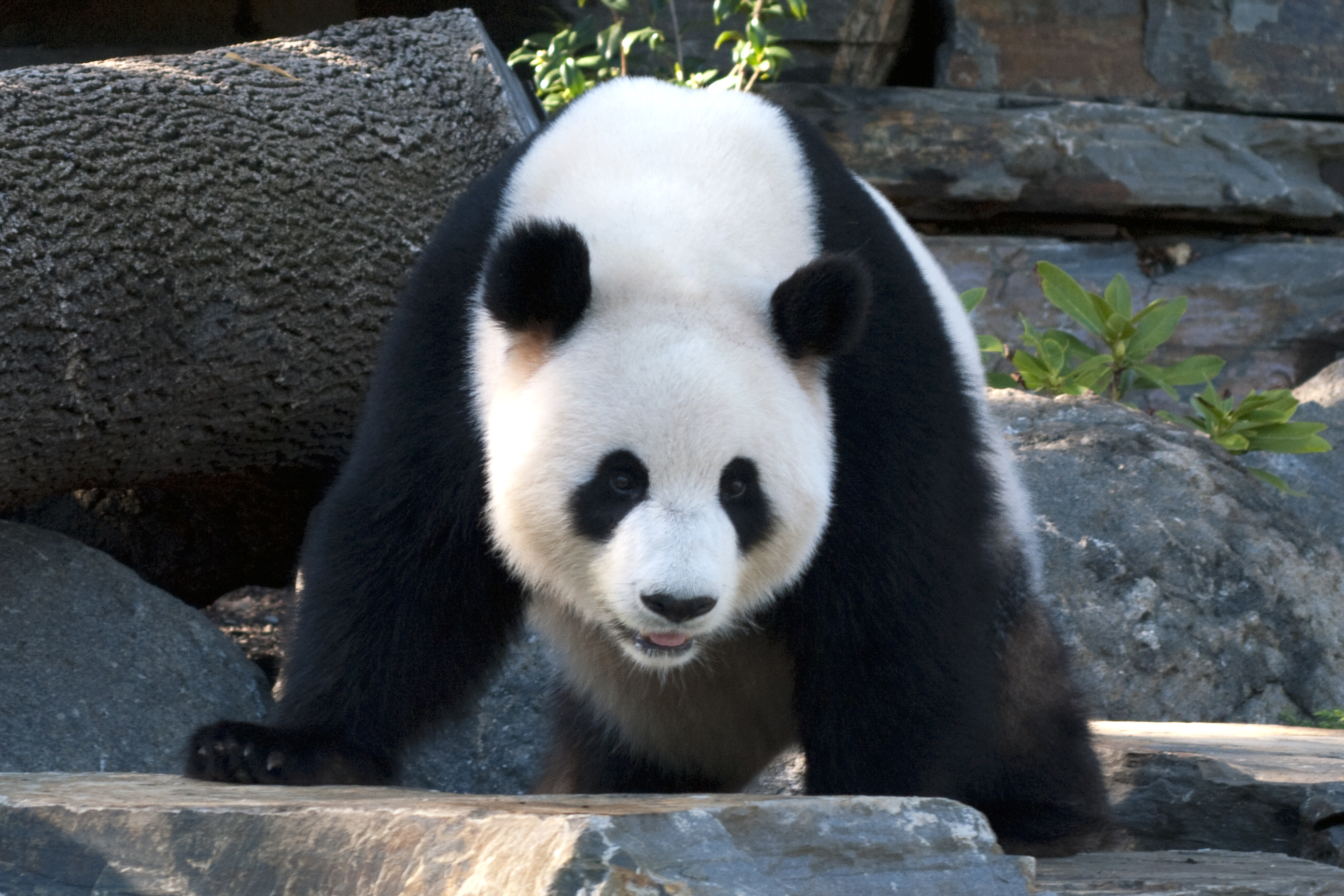
Giant panda

Adelaide Zoo opened on 23 May 1883, occupying 6.5 hectares (16 acres) (now 8 hectares (20 acres)) of land granted by the government. It was founded by the South Australian Acclimatization and Zoological Society. The society later became the Royal Zoological Society of South Australia after a royal charter was granted by King George VI in 1937.

The first director of the zoo, from 1882 to 1893, was R. E. Minchin. He was succeeded by his son A. C. Minchin from 1893 to 1934, and grandson R. R. L. Minchin from 1935 to 1940. Another grandson, Alfred Keith Minchin ran the private Koala Farm in the North Parklands from 1936 to 1960. The surplus koalas were set free on Kangaroo Island.

In the mid-twentieth century the zoo was involved in the export of live birds, with 99% of Australia's exports of live native birds, mainly finches and parrots for aviculture, passing through either Adelaide or Taronga (Sydney). At a time when the need for conservation of Australia's native birds, and control of their trade was becoming increasingly apparent, South Australia lagged behind other states in passing appropriate legislation.

In 1963, the government launched an investigation into the zoo's improper record-keeping of these birds. The new director of the zoo, William Gasking, was quickly dismissed through the power exerted by the Zoo Council president, Fred Basse, due to Gasking's attempts to address animal health and safety at the zoo. When Basse retired, the trade in birds dropped to one tenth of what it had been two years before. Since then, the zoo's administration has been restructured and the zoo has regained public credibility and scientific status.

The modern zoo has moved away from the traditional housing of species separately in pairs. Now species are grouped together as they would be in the wild, in exhibits that are carefully planned according to region. Enclosures have been designed with the needs of the animals in mind, providing a more natural habitat, which also serves an educational purpose for visitors. Although some of the zoo's heritage listed enclosures, such as the Elephant House that was built in 1900, have been retained, they are no longer used to house animals. The Elephant House now has educational signs. The last elephant housed at the Adelaide Zoo, Samorn, was moved to Monarto in 1991, where she died three years later.

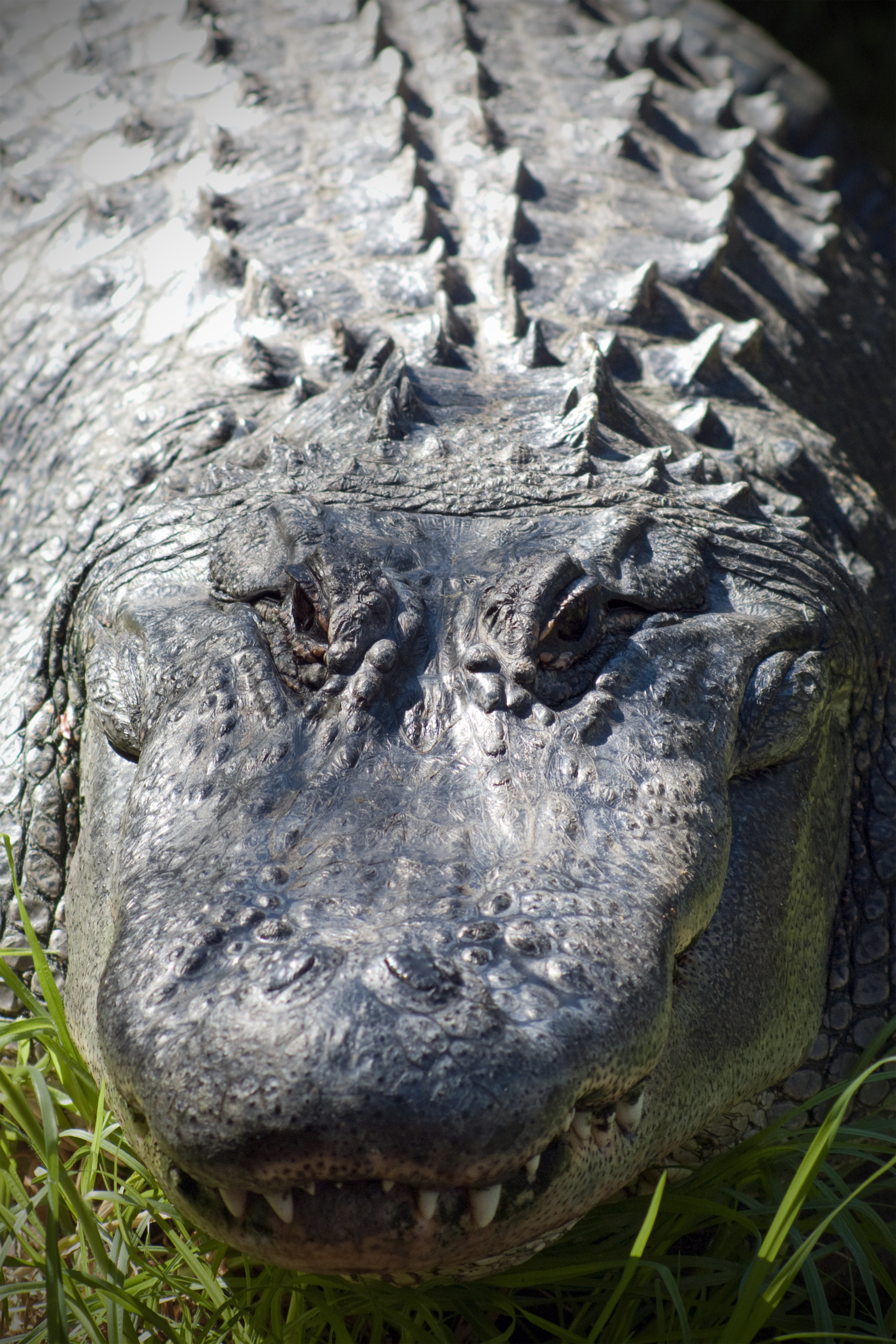
American alligator

The flamingo exhibit was opened in 1885, and is one of the few to have remained in the same position to date. Originally it was stocked with ten flamingos, most of which died during a drought in 1915. In 2014, one of two surviving greater flamingos in the exhibit, thought to be the oldest in the world at 83 years of age, died. The remaining Chilean flamingo at Adelaide Zoo, the last flamingo in Australia, which arrived in 1948, was humanely euthanised on 6 April 2018.

The nocturnal house opened in 1974. The reptile house opened in 1985 and was expanded in 1993. The giant panda exhibit and Bamboo Forest opened in 2009. This replaced the former "South America Section" and ungulate paddocks. The former great ape compound behind the administration building was demolished and replaced by an education centre and envirodome in 2008–2009.

In 2010, the main entrance was relocated off Frome Road in place of the hoofed animal yards, which were demolished. The famous polychrome masonry and cast-iron gates of the original entry, built in 1883 and restored in 1992, have been preserved.

The zoo's restaurant is located in a brick building that was originally a monkey house. It was constructed in 1891, converted to a kiosk in 1936, and renovated in 1989.

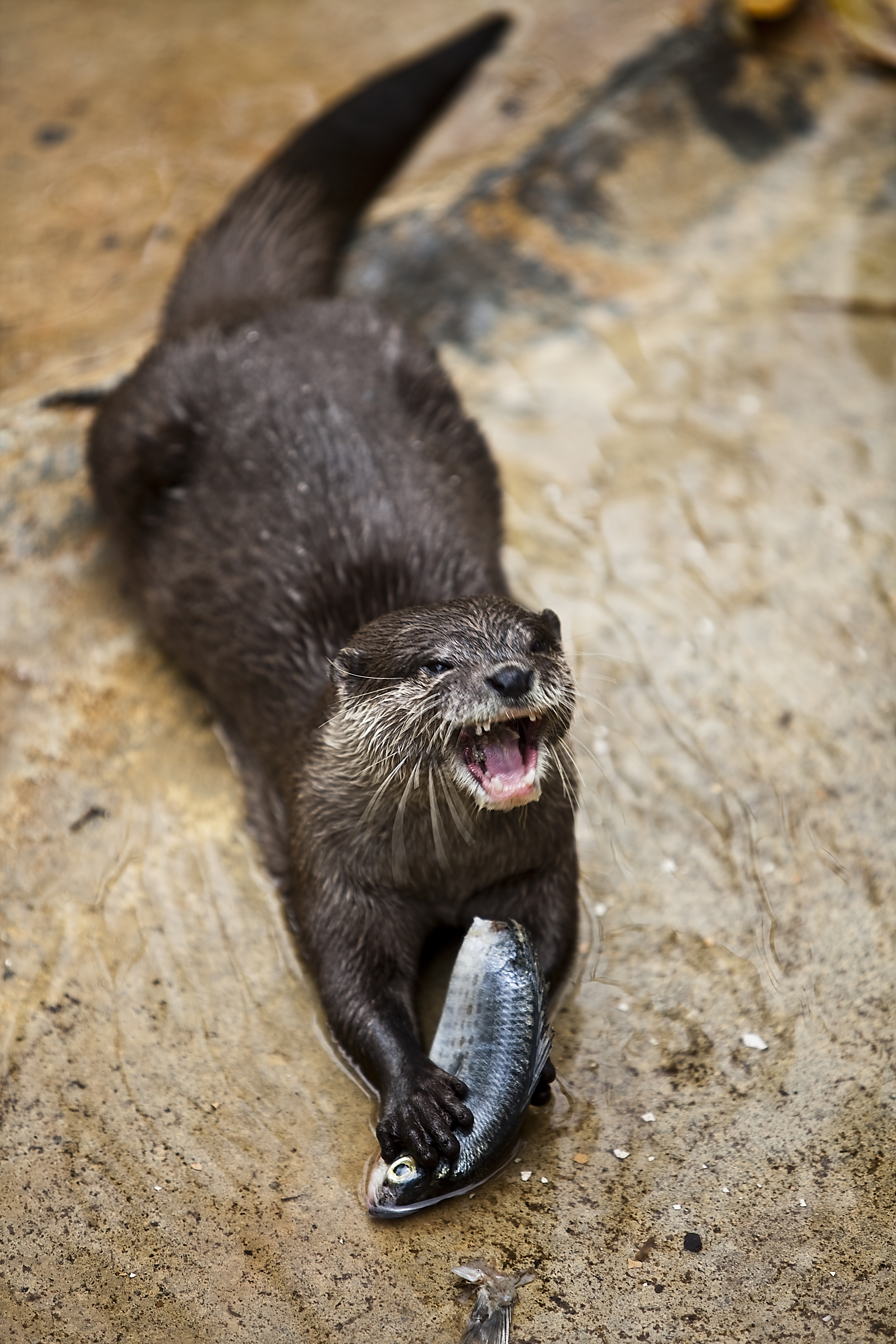
An Asian small-clawed otter being fed a fish

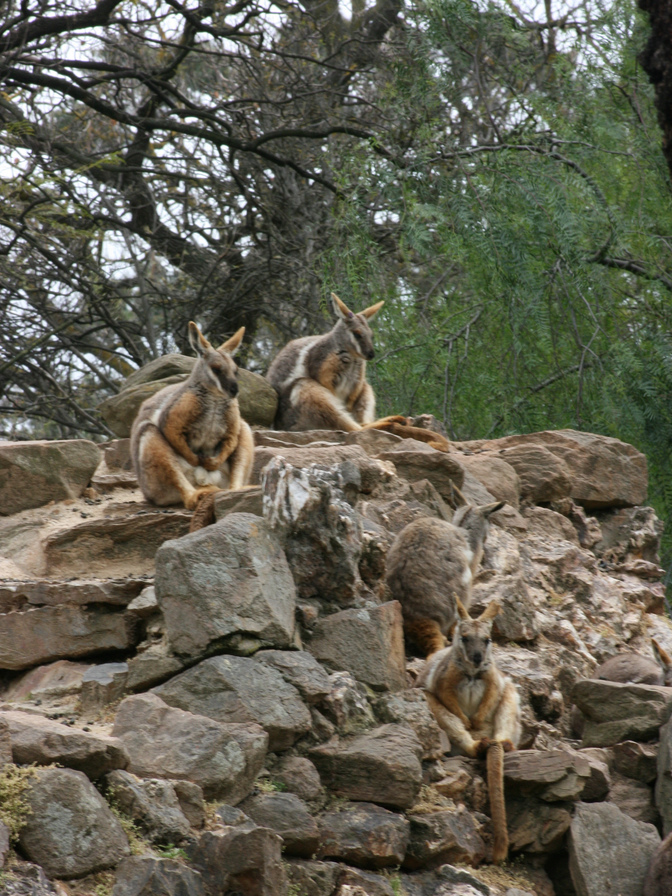
Yellow-footed rock wallabies atop rocky terrain. This species, with its distinctive tail markings, appears in the zoo's logo.

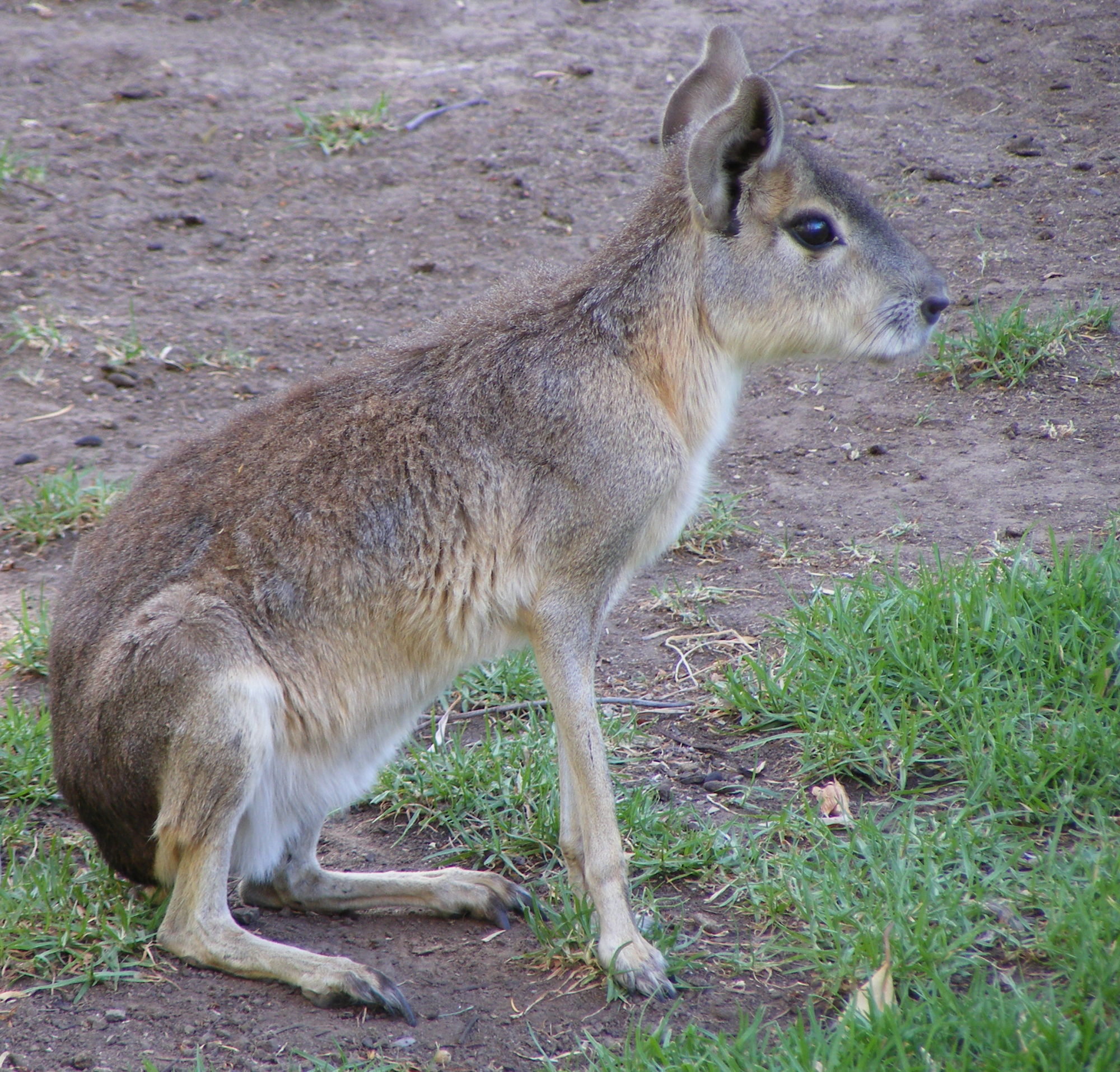
The zoo is home to the only Patagonian maras still held in Australia

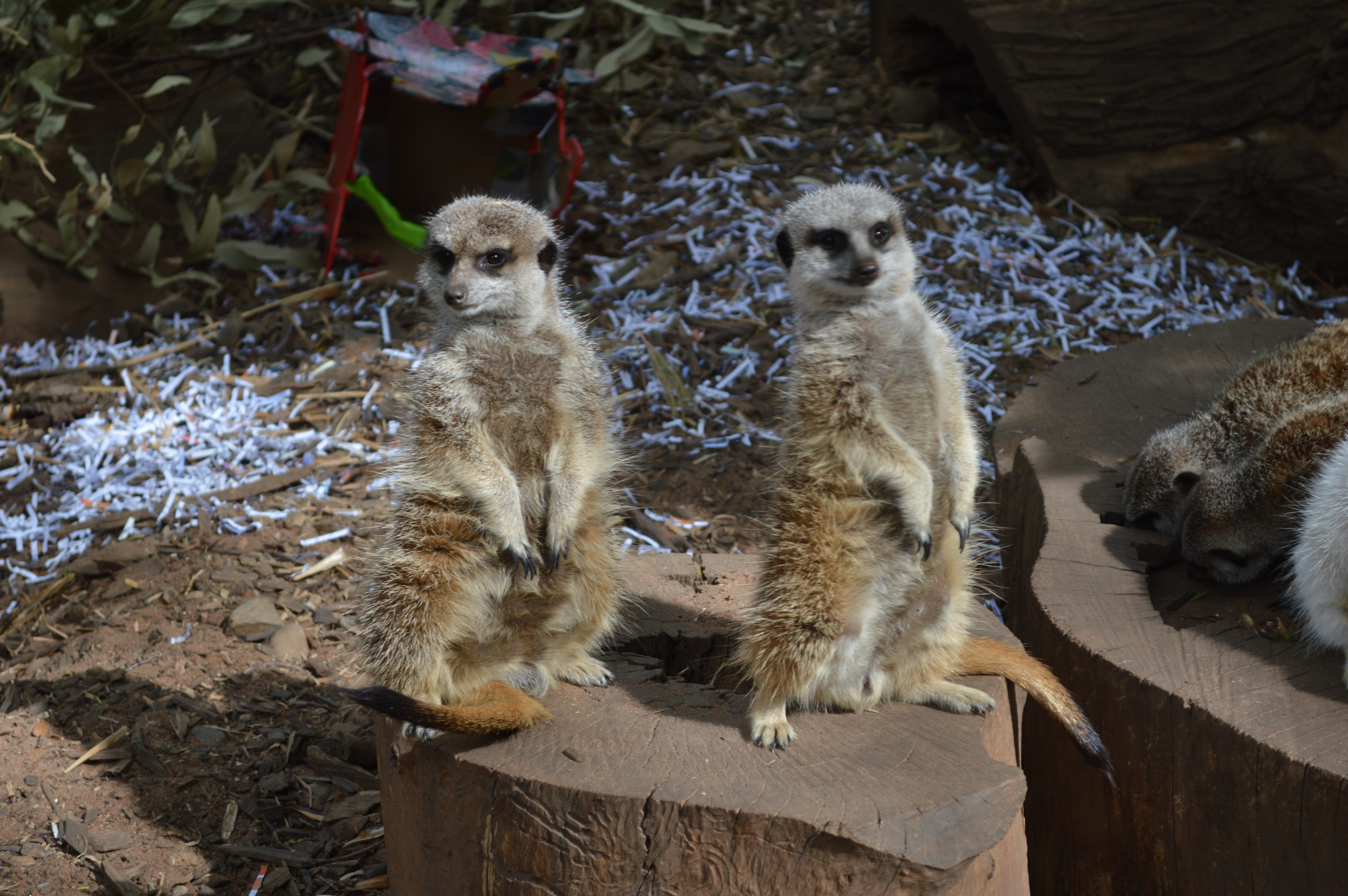
Meerkats

== Current focus ==
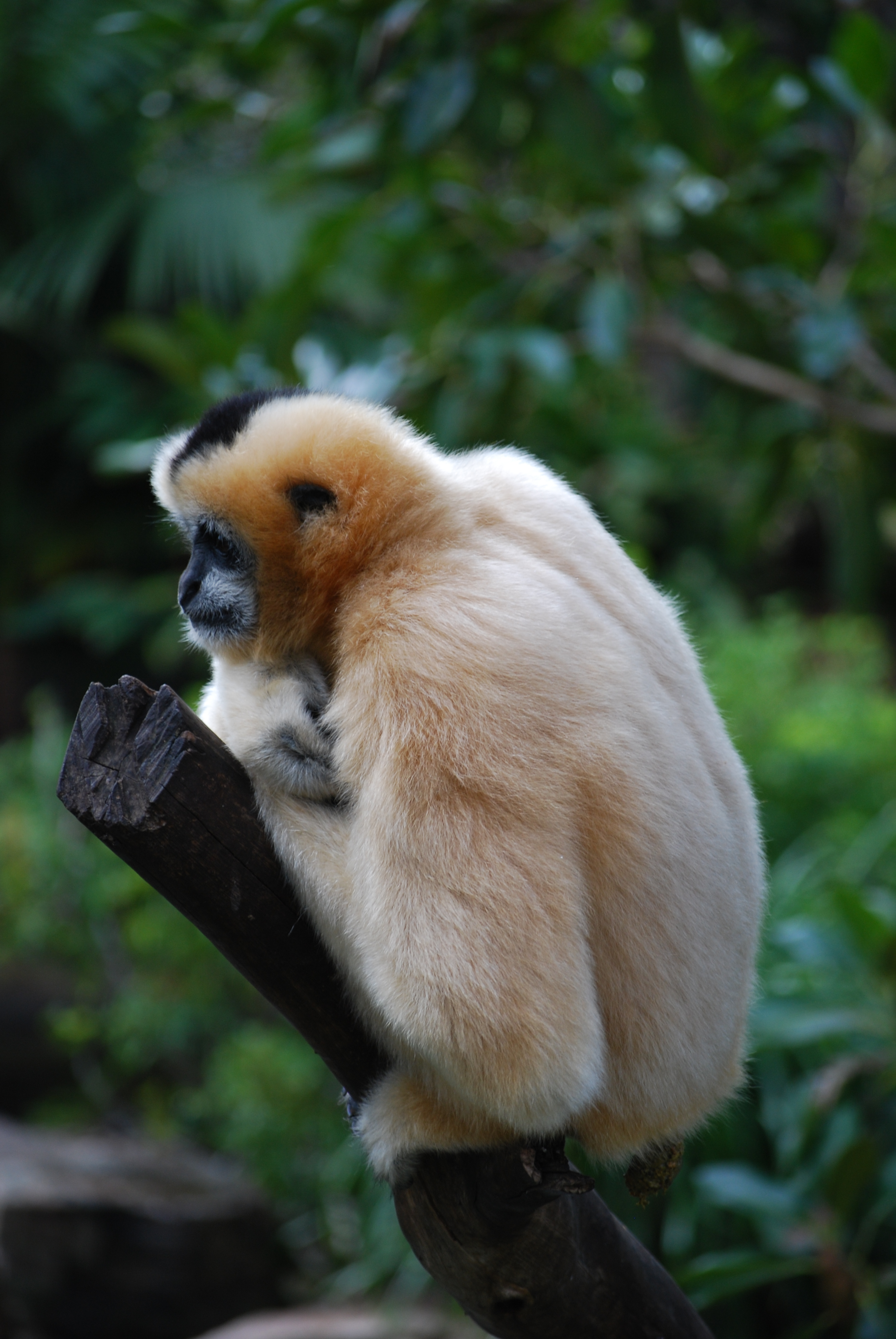
Northern white-cheeked gibbon (female)

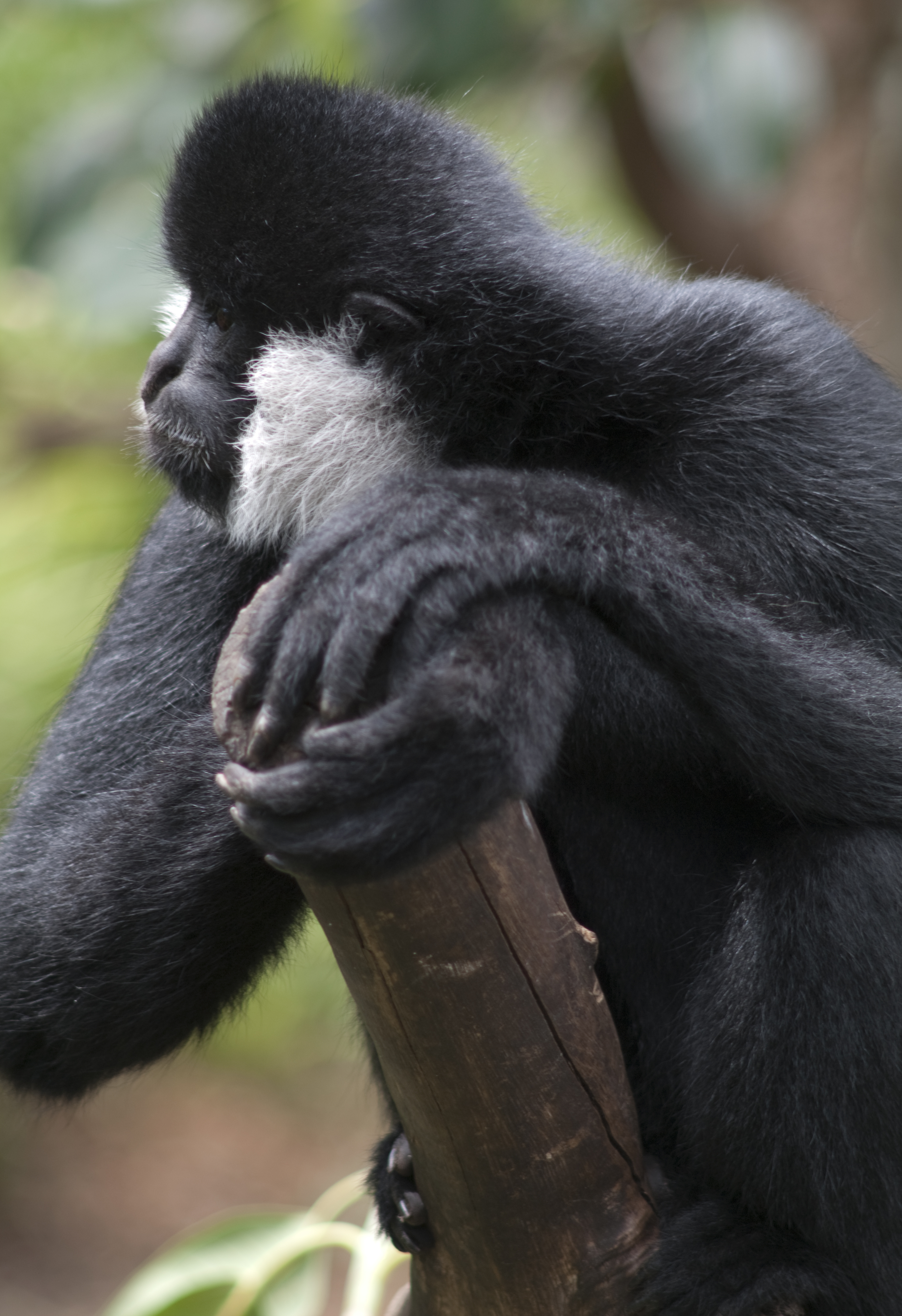
Northern white-cheeked gibbon (male)

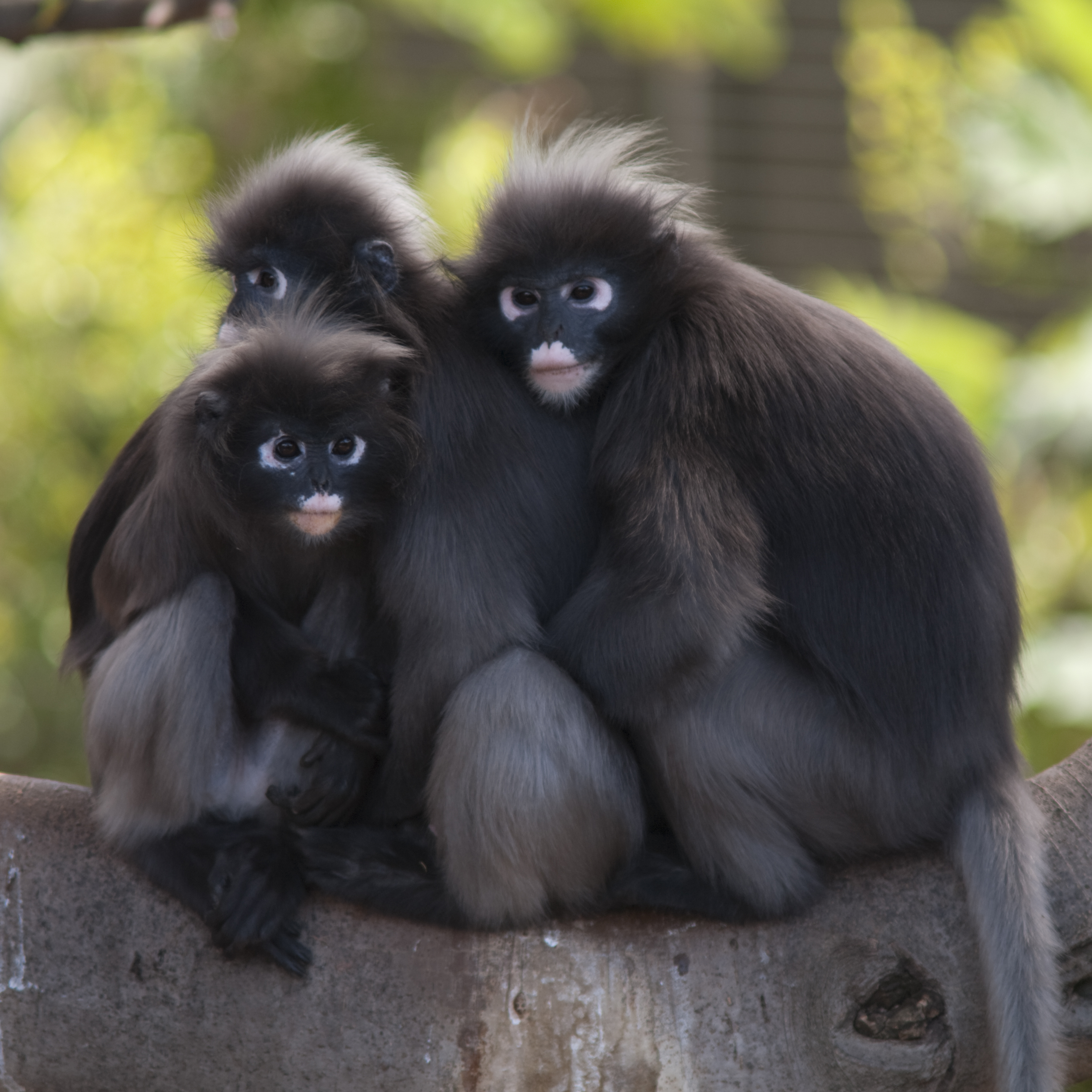
Dusky leaf monkeys

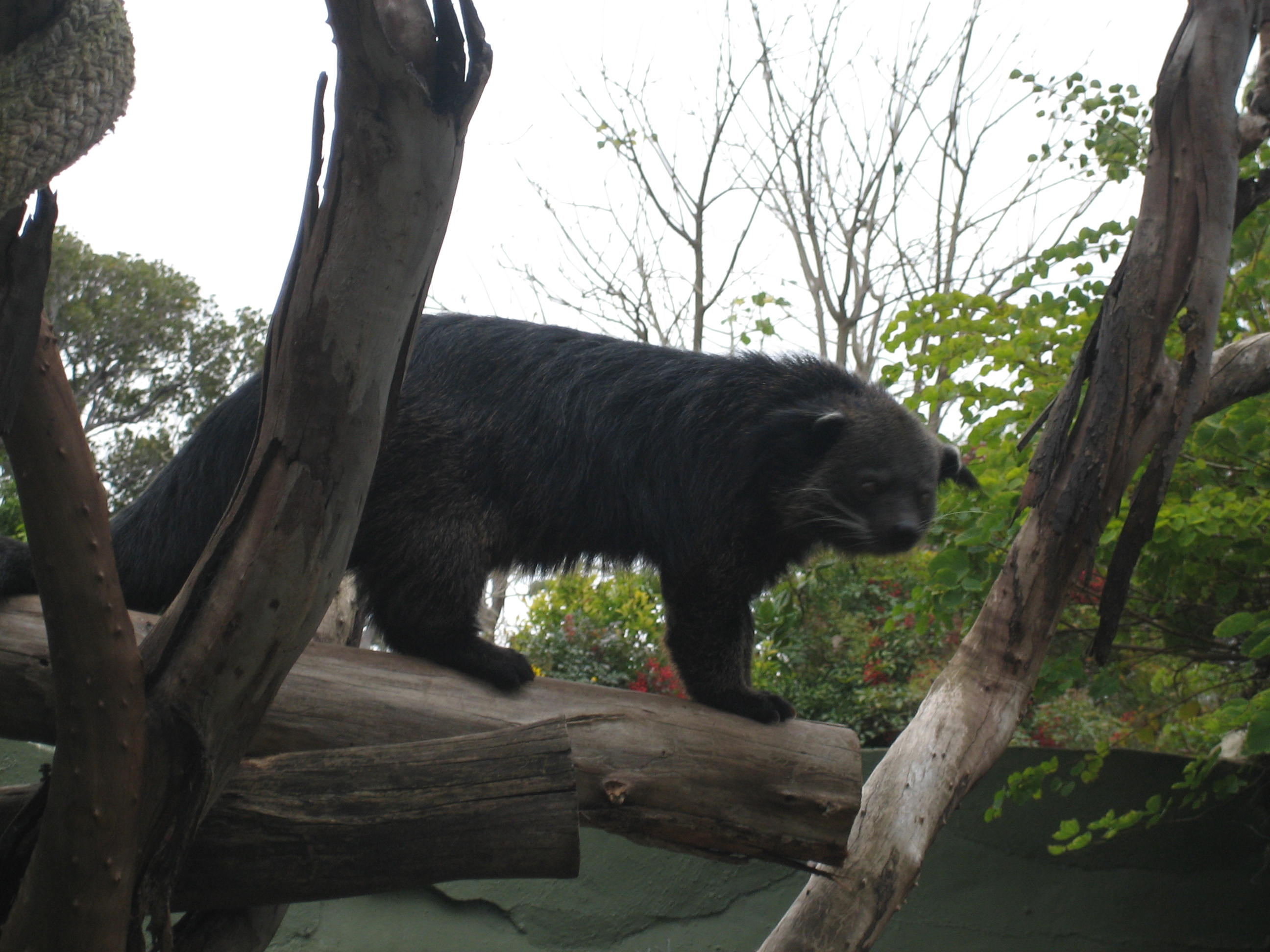
Binturong

The zoo has a particular focus on species from the Gondwana "supercontinent" which later broke up into South America, India, Africa, Australia and South East Asia. The botanic similarities between the regions are featured in the zoo's main exhibits, which include a South East Asian Rainforest, and Australian Rainforest Wetlands walk-through aviary. The South East Asian precinct combined Malayan tapir (the last zoo in Australia to keep them, until 2026) and dusky leaf monkeys in a shared exhibit together. Other exhibits are immersed next to each-other such as those for northern white-cheeked gibbons and siamangs on neighbouring rainforest lake islands. Pygmy hippopotamuses, mandrills and eastern black-and-white colobuses are amongst the African species conserved by the zoo.

The South East Asia Exhibit called Immersion was built in two parts. The first part was finished in 1995 which gave exhibits to animals such as siamangs and sun bears (the latter no longer held by the zoo). In late 2006 most of part two was finished which gave exhibits to Sumatran orangutans, siamangs and Sumatran tigers. There is also a large walk-through aviary which takes visitors past the two gibbon islands towards the tiger enclosures.

Adelaide Zoo has long been recognised for its impressive bird collection, but Australia's strict importation and quarantine laws make it unlikely that many exotic species will sustain genetically viable populations, a problem experienced by all zoos in the region. Importation of birds from overseas has been restricted in Australia since 1943, meaning additions to the exotic bird collection can only come from animals bred in the region or seized illegal imports, such as their hyacinth macaw specimen on exhibit. There are similar restrictions on acquiring many mammal species in Australia.

The zoo also has a focus on educational programs. There is a selection of "get to know the zoo" type of tours, a large "children's zoo" area, and from April 2009, an educational area for secondary school students and their teachers. Schools can hire the facility and groups can sleep there, with a member from the zoo supervising. Also, a new educational area called the Envirodome opened in April 2009. Night walks, tours and animal research can be done. More information on the educational programs can be found on the zoo's web site. The education building in the northeast corner of the zoo replaced the old ape grottos.

The zoo has continued to modernise, emphasizing immersive habitats that reflect natural ecosystems. Recent upgrade plans include improved enclosures for African, Asian and South American animals at the zoo as well as Australian native animals; as well as expanded breeding programs for native species like the Western swamp tortoise. The zoo also supports global conservation through initiatives aiding numerous endangered species.

== Animals ==
In 2023, the zoo housed more than 2,500 animals and 250 species. There were 1,300 animals of 282 species in 1990.

'Immersion' Precinct Trail

- Dusky leaf monkey
- Hamadryas baboon
- Mandrill
- Northern white-cheeked gibbon
- Pygmy hippopotamus
- Siamang
- Sumatran orangutan
- Sumatran tiger

Bamboo Forest Trail

- Giant Panda
- Red panda

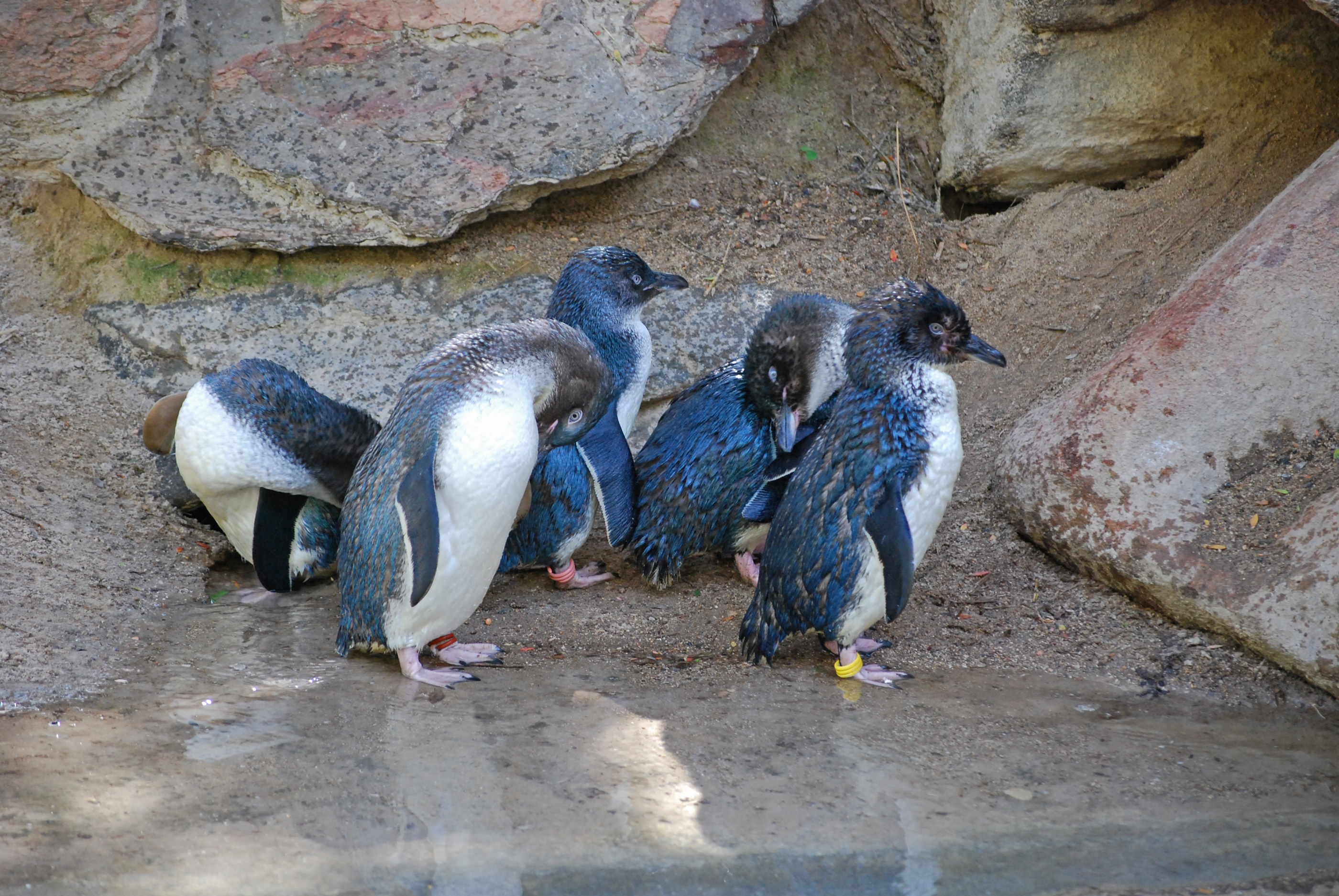
Little penguins

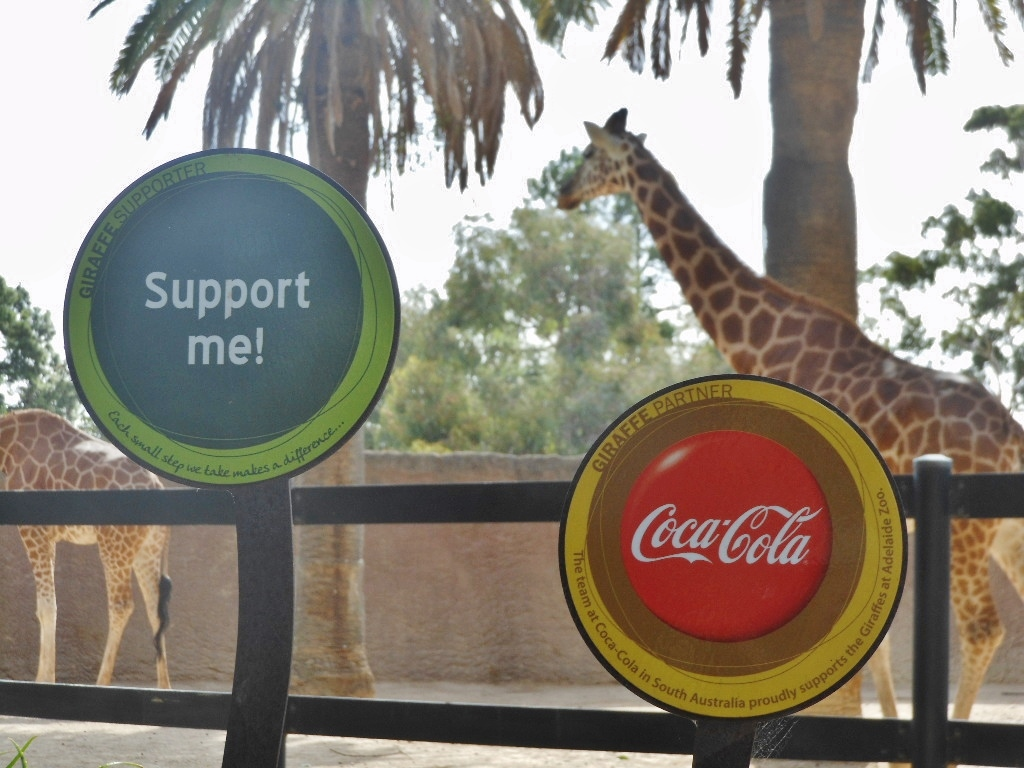
Giraffes

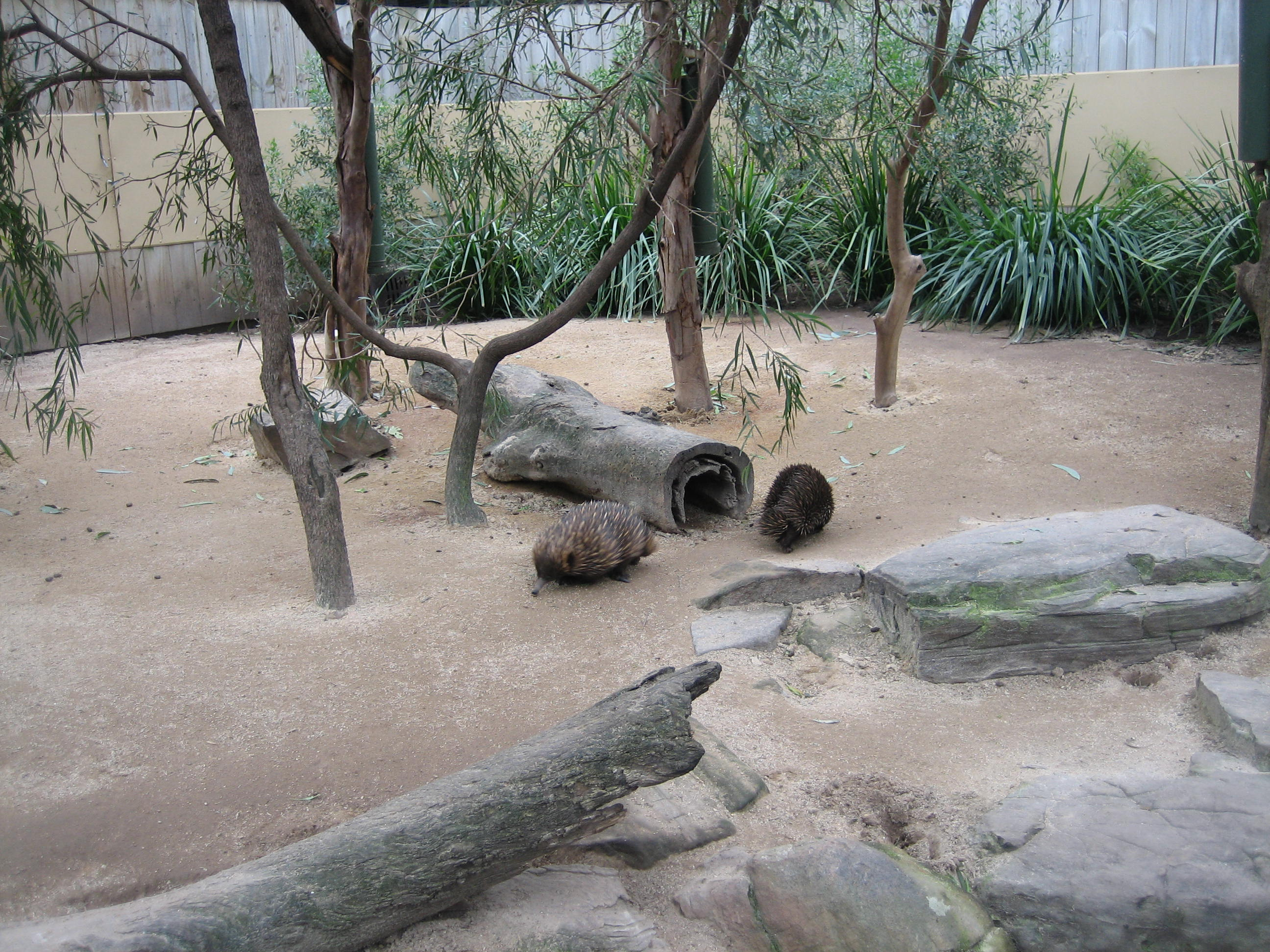
Short-beaked echidna

Zoos Main Trails/Pathways

- African spurred tortoise
- African spur-thighed tortoise
- Aldabra tortoise
- American alligator
- Asian small-clawed otter
- Binturong
- Black-capped squirrel monkey
- Brazilian tapir
- Capybara
- Dingo
- Giraffe
- Komodo dragon
- Little penguin
- Maned wolf
- Mantled guereza
- Meerkats
- Patagonian mara
- Quokka
- Rhinoceros iguana
- Ring-tailed lemur
- Serval
- Short-beaked echidna
- Southern cassowary
- Southern hairy-nosed wombat
- Tammar wallaby
- Tasmanian devil
- Yellow-footed rock wallaby

Tamarin House

- Cotton-top tamarin
- Emperor tamarin
- Golden lion tamarin

Nocturnal House

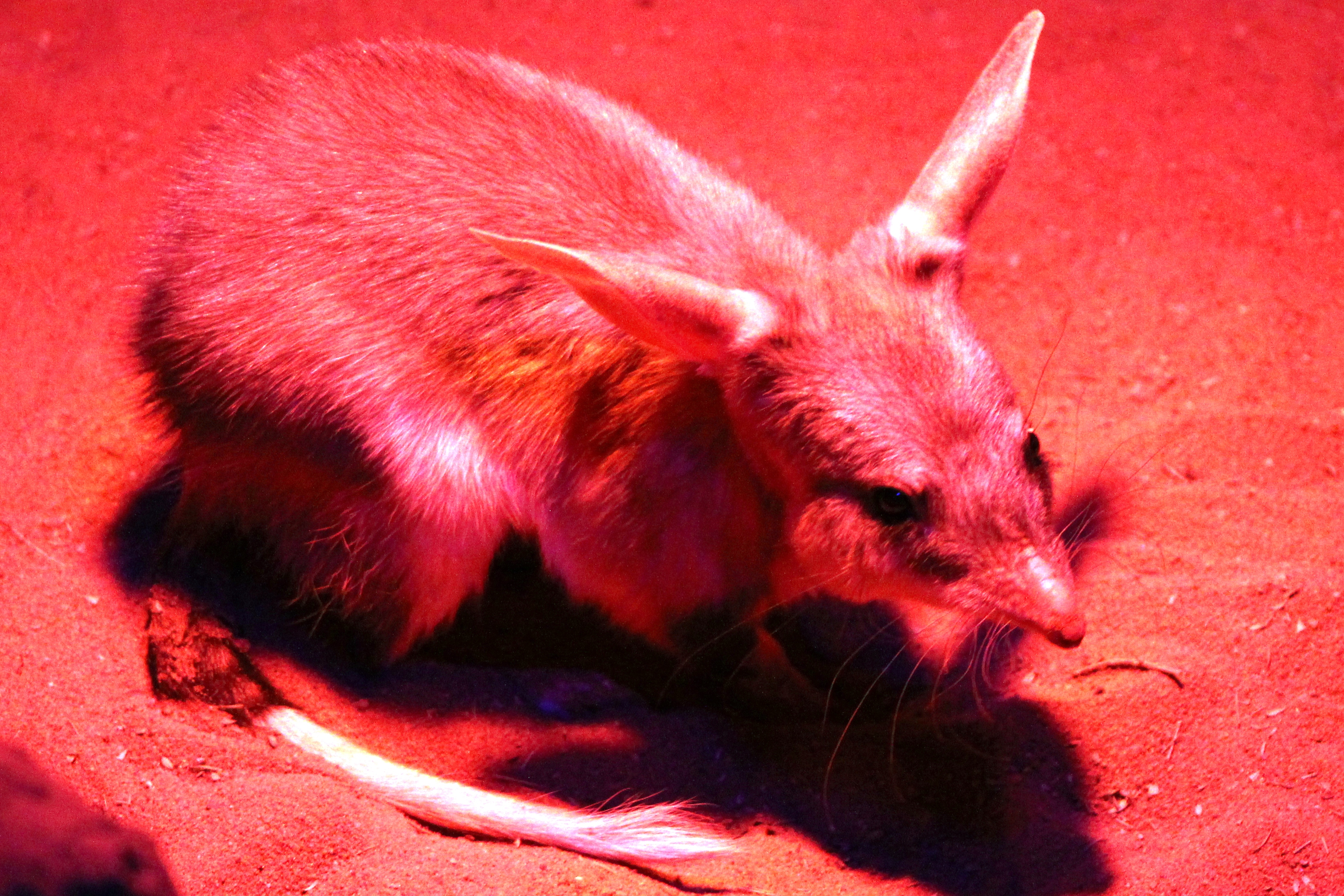
Greater bilby in the Nocturnal House

- Black-footed tree-rat
- Brush-tailed bettong
- Brush-tailed mulgara
- Tawny frogmouth
- Fat-tailed dunnart
- Greater bilby
- Greater stick-nest rat
- Olive python
- Spinifex hopping-mouse
- Squirrel glider

Variety Children's Zoo

- Domestic goat
- Domestic rabbit
- Elongated tortoise
- Guinea pig
- Hermann's tortoise
- Silkie chicken

Reptile House

- Adelaide pygmy blue-tongued lizard
- Aruba Island rattlesnake
- Blood python
- Boyd's forest dragon
- Broad-headed snake
- Central netted dragon
- Centralian knob-tailed gecko
- Corn snake
- Gila monster
- Green anaconda
- Hosmer's spiny-tailed skink
- Inland taipan
- Red-bellied black snake
- Southern angle-headed dragon
- Southern death adder
- Woma python

Jewels of Asia Aviary

- Black-capped lory
- Black-winged stilt
- Chattering lory
- Dollarbird
- Dusky lory
- Emerald dove
- Luzon bleeding-heart dove
- Malabar parakeet
- Noisy pitta
- Palm cockatoo
- Red lory
- Rose-crowned fruit-dove
- Sacred kingfisher
- White-breasted ground dove

South-East Asian Aviary

- Indian peafowl
- Java sparrow
- Lady Amherst's pheasant
- Mandarin duck
- Nicobar pigeon
- Plum-headed parakeet

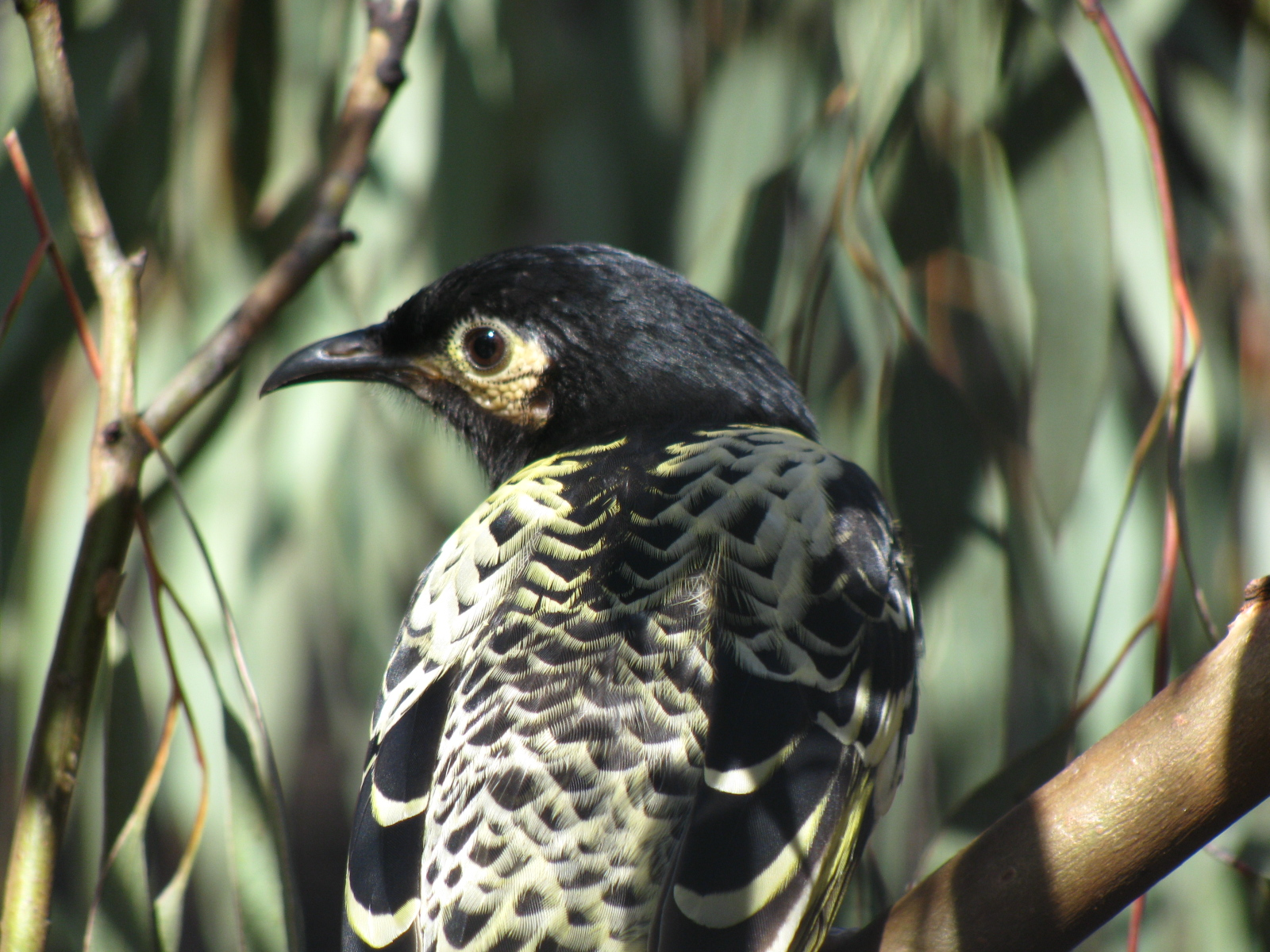
Regent honeyeater

Birds of the Adelaide Hills Aviary

- Bush stone-curlew
- Regent honeyeater
- Swift parrot

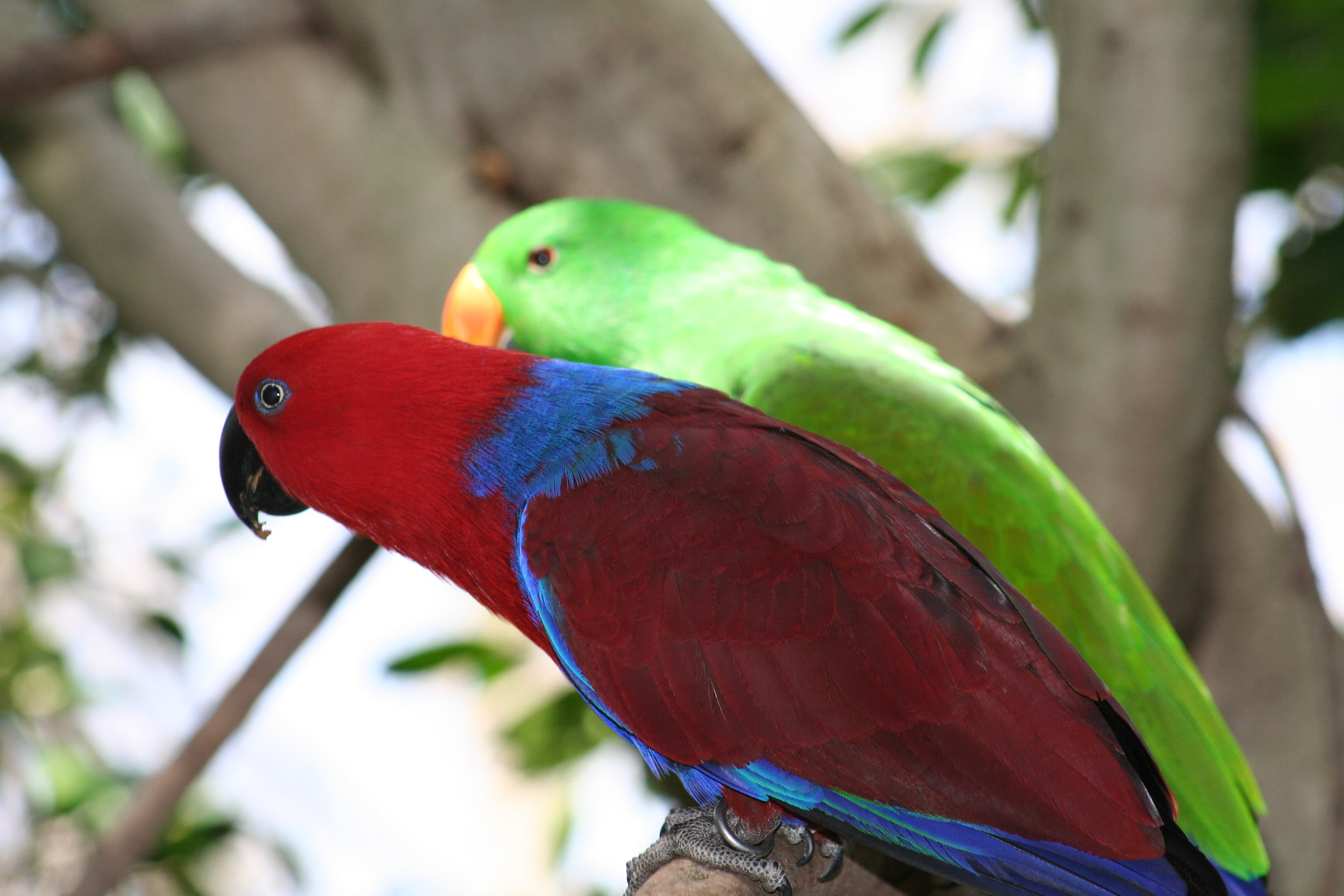
Eclectus parrots (female and male)

Australian Rainforest Birds Walkthrough Aviary

- Australasian figbird
- Australian king parrot
- Buff-banded rail
- Eclectus parrot
- Pied imperial pigeon
- Regent bowerbird
- Satin bowerbird
- Superb lyrebird
- White-headed pigeon
- Wonga pigeon

Ponds and Wetland Walkthrough Aviary

- Australian pelican
- Brolga
- Cape Barren goose
- Chestnut teal
- Glossy ibis
- Little egret
- Little pied cormorant
- Royal spoonbill

Birds of the Australian Desert Aviary

- Budgerigar
- Cockatiel

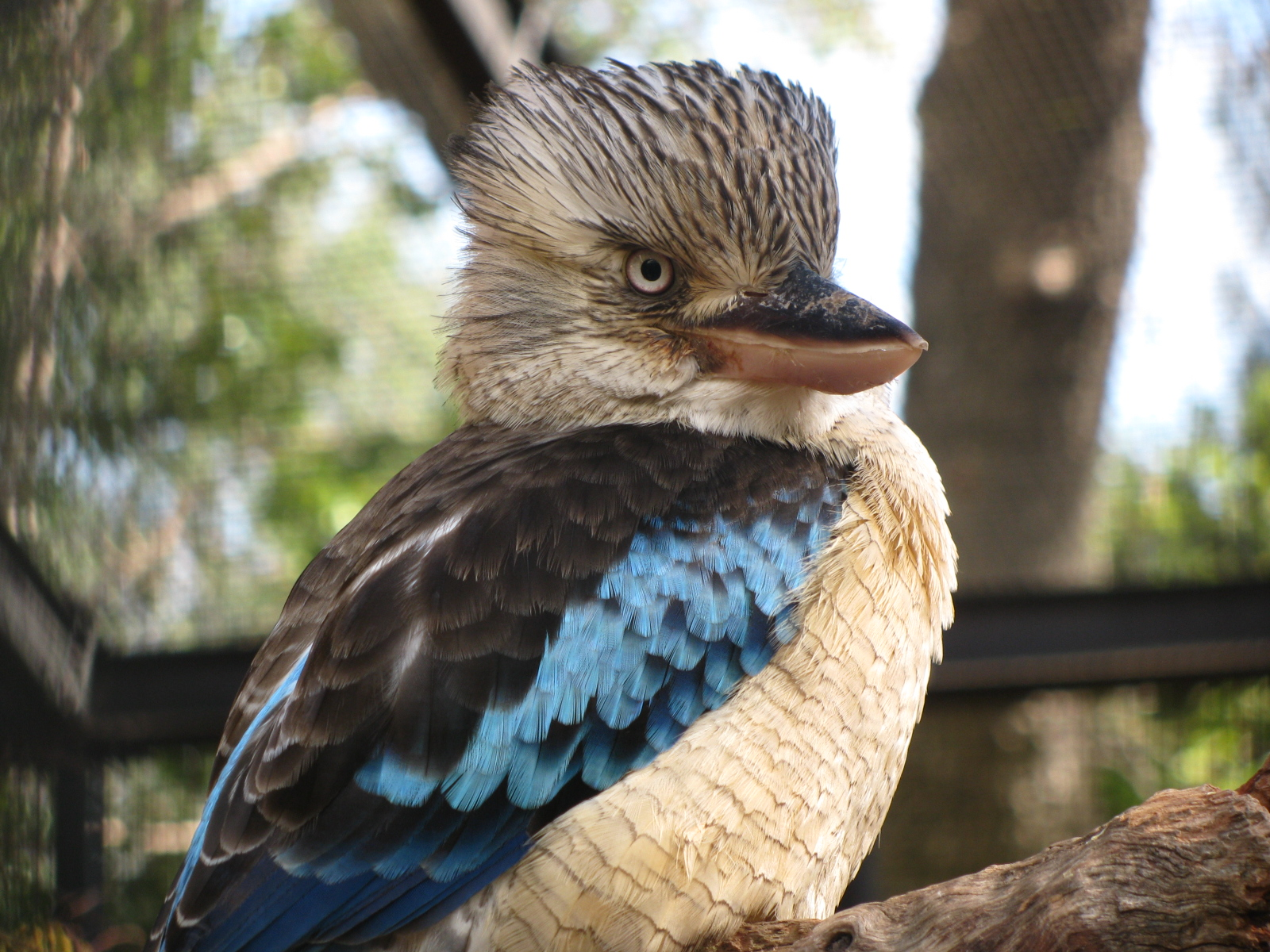
Blue-winged kookaburra

Other Birds

- African grey parrot
- Australian figbird
- Banded lapwing
- Barking owl
- Black lory
- Black-breasted buzzard
- Black-capped caique
- Black-necked stork
- Blue and gold macaw
- Blue-winged kookaburra
- Brown-throated conure
- Buff-banded rail
- Crested bellbird
- Crimson-bellied conure
- Diamond dove
- Elegant parrot
- Gang-gang cockatoo
- Gouldian finch
- Helmeted guineafowl
- Illiger's macaw
- Major Mitchell's cockatoo
- Nankeen kestrel
- Orange-bellied parrot
- Painted finch
- Radjah shelduck
- Red-headed parrotfinch
- Red-tailed black cockatoo
- Regent parrot
- Scarlet macaw
- Striped honeyeater
- Sun conure
- Superb fairy-wren
- Tawny frogmouth
- Wandering whistling duck
- White-bellied caique
- White-browed woodswallow
- Yellow-crowned amazon
- Yellow-naped amazon
- Yellow-tailed black cockatoo
- Zebra finch

Envirodome
The Envirodome is an interactive visitor experience housed in the old Ape Block along with the Education Centre. The non-animal exhibits are hands-on and are aimed at the conservation of our environment, hoping to educate the public on simple changes they can make to help the environment. The building itself has been largely recycled and has a green roof, rain-water fed toilets, hay-bale walls and solar panels. Animals housed in the Environdrome include:

- Australian grass mantis
- Australian red-eyed tree frog
- Australian rainforest scorpion
- Australian tarantula
- Banded archerfish
- Blistered pyrgomorph
- Cane toad
- Children's stick insect
- Egyptian beetle
- Golden orb-weaver
- Goliath stick insect
- Magnificent tree frog
- Mitchell's rainforest snail
- Murray River short-neck turtle
- Northern spiny-tailed gecko
- Rainforest millipede
- Rough-scaled python
- Spiny leaf insect
- Tiger huntsman
- Veiled chameleon
- Wolf spider
- Cardinal Tetra
- Otocinclus
- Neocaridina davidi
- Harlequin rasbora
- Pygmy corydoras
- Hippocampus kuda

== Incidents ==
In January 1902, a keeper was seriously mauled by a brown bear (a species no longer kept by the zoo), having inadequately secured the animal before entering the enclosure. The bear was shot by fellow keepers and the man rushed to hospital where he slowly recovered (but lost his right arm and suffered serious other permanent injuries, but lived for another ten and a half years).

In September 1909, the Strand Magazine reported that a snake had swallowed a rug weighing almost 12 pounds (5.4 kg), and which survived undamaged in the snake's stomach until disgorged almost a month later. The short article featured a photograph of the disgorged rug which was 5 feet 3 inches (1.60 m) long. Contemporary (1894) accounts had the size of the rug, which was kept in the enclosure for the boa constrictor's comfort, at 7 by 6 feet (2.1 m × 1.8 m), and after disgorgement weighed 5.5 pounds (2.5 kg), dried.

In February 1920, a keeper was hosing the front of the polar bear enclosure (another species no longer kept by the zoo) when one of the bears reached through the bars and grabbed the hose pulling the keeper forward and mauling him, severing his arm above the elbow. A. C. Minchin, the zoo director, and other staff intervened and freed the man who was then rushed to the hospital where he died two days later from his injuries.

In 1985, two men broke in and killed 64 animals.

In 2005, a boy was impaled when he tried to jump the spiked fence with his friends at night. He did not survive.

On 30 October 2008, a 78-year-old blind male greater flamingo named "Greater" was beaten, allegedly by a group of teenagers. Four teenagers were charged after visitors reported an incident to zoo staff. The flamingo was left "extremely stressed". "Greater", the last greater flamingo in Australia, died on 30 January 2014 at the estimated age of 83.

On Mother's Day 2009, the female orangutan, Karta, built an escape route out of plant material and tripped the hot wires with a stick. After a short while on the "outside" she dropped back into the exhibit with no harm done.

On 12 August 2022, a newly arrived red panda, Ravi, escaped from its enclosure, before being located in a tree at the Botanic Park on 14 August. The red panda was tranquilised after keepers failed to entice it down with food.

On 11 October 2022, it was reported that Zoos SA was investigating the deaths of seven female quokkas and two yellow-footed rock wallabies during September. The cause of their deaths was believed to be plant toxicity.

== Notable animals ==
The last captive Javan rhino was displayed at the Adelaide Zoo as an Indian rhinoceros due to the lack of knowledge about this species. It died in 1907.

The last American beaver at the zoo died in July 2010 and was the last beaver to be held at any zoo (or anywhere) in Australia.

Miss C, the last Hoffmann's two-toed sloth in Australia and the oldest in the world died in June 2017 aged 43.

Wang Wang and Fu Ni, two giant pandas, were on loan to Adelaide Zoo from 2009 to 2024, as part of a conservation program to protect endangered wildlife.

Yiray the quokka, one of the Australia-native threatened species at the Adelaide Zoo, gave birth to a baby in March 2022.

Snow White, more commonly known as Snowy, is the world's first and only known “white meerkat”. She was born at Adelaide Zoo in September 2010, and began to develop white fur and skin in late 2012; veterinarians eventually diagnosed her with vitiligo. Prior to 2016 she was named Michael Jackson, after the late pop singer who had been afflicted with the same condition during his lifetime. She and the seven brothers she shared an enclosure with would later be renamed after the titular characters of Walt Disney's 1937 animated film Snow White and the Seven Dwarfs. Apart from requiring sunscreen and a shadier enclosure to protect her skin from sun damage, Snowy's vitiligo appears to have had minimal effect on her quality of life. Snowy was euthanized on October 30th 2024, suffering from age-related health issues at the age of 14.

== See also ==
- List of zoos in Australia
