= Wang Wang and Fu Ni =

Pair of giant pandas

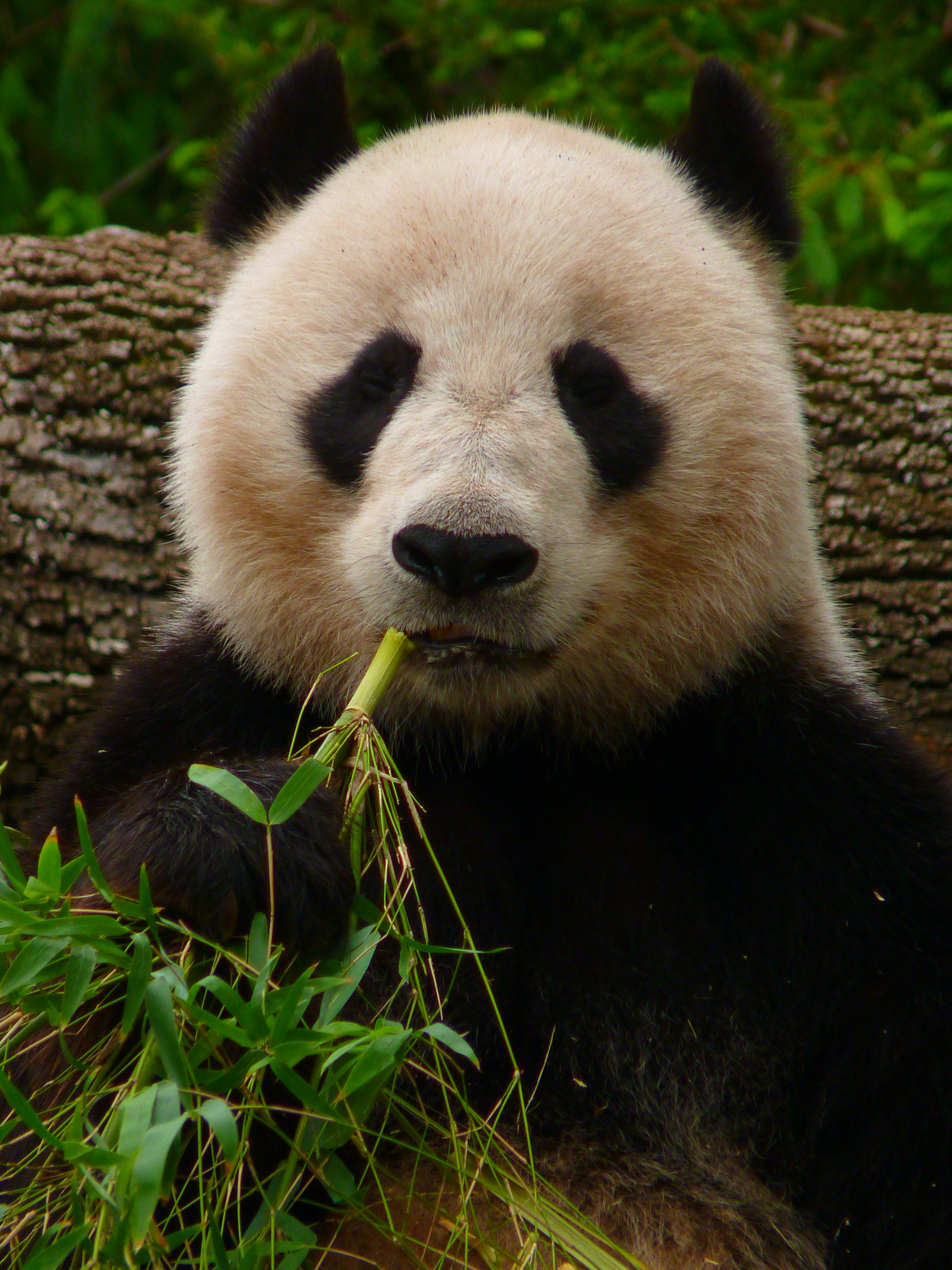
- Wang Wang in 2011
- Species: Giant panda
- Residence: Wolong National Nature Reserve (until 2009; since 2024); Adelaide Zoo (2009–2024)
- Wang Wang
- Sex: Male
- Born: 31 August 2005 (age 21); Wolong National Nature Reserve, China
- Fu Ni
- Sex: Female
- Born: 23 August 2006 (age 20); Wolong National Nature Reserve, China
- Parent: Long Xin (mother) Lu Lu (father)

Wang Wang (Chinese: 网网; pinyin: Wǎng Wǎng; lit. 'Net Net'; born 31 August 2005) and Fu Ni (Chinese: 福妮; pinyin: Fú Nī; lit. 'Lucky Girl'; born 23 August 2006) are a pair of giant pandas who lived at Adelaide Zoo from 2009 to 2024. Born at Wolong National Nature Reserve in China, the pair relocated to Adelaide Zoo in Adelaide, South Australia, in 2009, making them the only living giant pandas in the Southern Hemisphere. Wang Wang and Fu Ni were on loan for ten years for $1 million annually as part of a giant panda breeding program, but did not breed after more than five unsuccessful attempts by the zoo. Fu Ni has experienced many false pregnancies, which were difficult to distinguish from actual pregnancies. The loan has been described as an instance of panda diplomacy between Australia and China.

In 2019, the Government of South Australia signed a deal to extend the pandas' stay in Adelaide for five more years. Wang Wang and Fu Ni returned to China on 15 November 2024 following the expiration of their contract with Adelaide Zoo. Two new pandas, Xing Qiu and Yi Lan, arrived at the zoo in December 2024 following a new deal between Australia and China.

== Etymology ==
Fu Ni (Chinese: 福妮) means "lucky girl" and Wang Wang (Chinese: 网网) means "net net". According to Chinese ambassador Zhang Junsai, the name reflects their hopes that "the lucky girl will fall into the net of love" and have a baby. Wang Wang was given his name while in China. In 2009, Mandarin speakers emailed an Adelaide television station arguing that the name was pronounced "wong wong"; this pronunciation is favoured by the Adelaide Chinese community.

== Early life (2005–2009) ==
Wang Wang was born on 31 August 2005, and Fu Ni was born on 23 August 2006, at the Wolong Giant Panda Research Centre in China. Fu Ni was born to mother Long Xin and father Lu Lu. President Hu Jintao first offered them to Australia at the 2007 Asia-Pacific Economic Cooperation in Sydney. The 2008 Sichuan earthquake caused the destruction of the research centre and the death of Mao Mao, Wang Wang's mother, and the pandas were relocated to the Bifengxia Giant Panda Breeding Centre.

== Arrival at Adelaide Zoo (2009–2010) ==
Wang Wang and Fu Ni arrived at Adelaide Zoo in Adelaide, South Australia, on 29 November 2009, escorted by police in a climate-controlled semitrailer. They first appeared on 13 December after Governor-General Quentin Bryce officially opened their enclosure. 175 families helped to plant bamboo in their enclosure for them. Initially on loan for ten years as part of a global giant panda breeding program, Wang Wang and Fu Ni were the only giant pandas in the Southern Hemisphere at the time.

Zoos SA borrowed $6.7 million to fund the pandas, while a lack of sponsors added to the debt. The state government invested $18.9 million for the new entrance and fence, and the zoo paid $8 million for the new exhibit from sponsors, donors, and loans. After Wang Wang and Fu Ni's arrival, Adelaide Zoo's visitors grew 70% and membership to Zoos SA had grown 25%. However, after initial expectations that the pandas would contribute $600 million to the South Australian economy in the course of a decade, visitor numbers returned to the same levels before their arrival by 2010. A large amount of media attention was given to their arrival, and the loan has been described as an instance of "panda diplomacy" between Australia and China. In 2019, Prime Minister Scott Morrison criticized the Australian Labor Party's pledge to fund Wang Wang and Fu Ni for five more years, saying that the Queensland floods should be more of a priority.

== Life at Adelaide and breeding attempts (2010–2024) ==
On 12 January 2010, Wang Wang and Fu Ni were released from their glass enclosures into their exhibit after a period of quarantine. They also joined Earth Hour as "official ambassadors". Their exhibit, which is called the Bamboo Forest, is also home to two red pandas, Ravi and Mishry.

The pandas were in the same exhibit when they first arrived, but were separated by a wire mesh until Fu Ni reached sexual maturity. They were introduced for the first time in late 2011. Whenever she began her oestrus cycle, Fu Ni climbed her tree in the enclosure, and Wang Wang marked his territory by what The Guardian described as "twerk[ing] around the place", but when Wang Wang tried getting in Fu Ni's tree before she was ready to mate, she would dismiss him with a swipe and a grunt. She experienced several pseudopregnancies, which were difficult to distinguish from actual pregnancies, as her blood tests, chemical signals, and behavior indicated she was pregnant. Furthermore, giant pandas have a short annual window to breed, often around 24–72 hours.

On 24 November 2019, the Government of South Australia signed a new agreement with China to fund the pandas for five more years, after the initial ten-year deal had expired and the pandas were set to return to China. There have been five previous unsuccessful attempts to get the pair to mate. There were also four or more attempts to artificially inseminate Fu Ni, including three procedures in 2017 and another that was planned in late 2022. Adelaide Zoo confirmed that Fu Ni had undergone either a "pseudopregnancy or a loss" in February 2023. She underwent a pregnancy in early 2017.

Wang Wang and Fu Ni returned to China following the expiration of their contract with Adelaide Zoo in November 2024. They were replaced by pandas Xing Qiu and Yi Lan, as a result of a new deal between Australia and China.

== See also ==
- List of individual giant pandas
- List of individual bears
