= William Edward Lancaster =

William Edward Lancaster CBE AM
- W.E. Lancaster CBE AM
- Born: 1909
- Died: 2003 (aged 93–94)
- Known for: Chief Executive of the Royal Zoological Society of South Australia

William Edward Lancaster CBE AM (1909–2003) was Chief Executive of the Royal Zoological Society of South Australia.

== Life ==
William Edward Lancaster was born in Hampstead on 9 May 1909, the son of Charles Lancaster and Sarah Martha (née Lovesey). He was educated at Bedford Modern School, Downing College, Cambridge (MA) and the Royal (Dick) School of Veterinary Studies at the University of Edinburgh (MRCVS, DVTM).

Lancaster worked in the British Colonial Service in Malaya where he was Director of Veterinary Services for the Federation of Malaya. He was held captive by the Japanese as a prisoner of war between 1942 and 1945. He later became Chief Executive of the Royal Zoological Society of South Australia.

Lancaster was invested as a Commander of the Order of the British Empire in the Queen’s 1980 Australian Birthday Honours for public service as Director of the Zoological Gardens of South Australia. He died in Australia in 2003.
