= Monarto Safari Park =

Open-range zoo in South Australia

- Interactive map of Monarto Safari Park
- 35.1021°S 139.1424°E
- Date opened: 1983
- Location: Monarto, South Australia
- Land area: 1,500 hectares (3,700 acres)
- Website: www.monartosafari.com.au

Monarto Safari Park, formerly known as Monarto Zoological Park and Monarto Zoo, is a 1,500-hectare (3,700-acre) open-range zoo near Murray Bridge in South Australia. By area, Monarto Safari Park is the largest zoo in Australia. It is located at Monarto, approximately 70 kilometres (43 mi) from Adelaide's centre.

The safari park houses over 500 animals representing more than 50 different species. It is home to a large selection of exotic and native animals, particularly focusing on native African species. In the period 2024-2025 the park welcomed over 210,000+ visitors. Monarto is administered by the Royal Zoological Society of South Australia, a non-profit organization who also run Adelaide Zoo. Monarto Safari Park is the world's largest safari park outside Africa.

== History ==
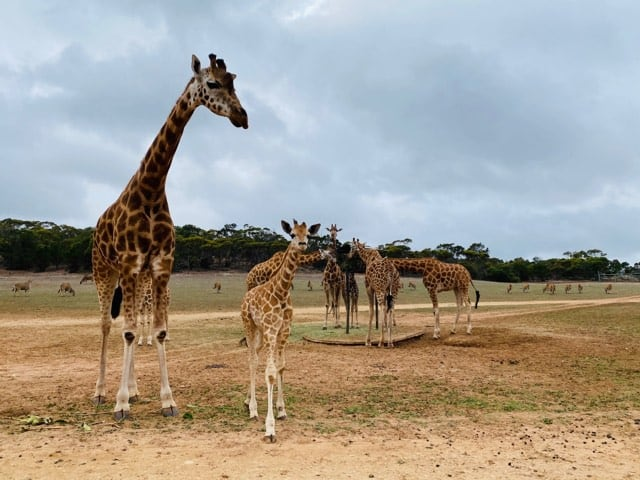
Monarto Zoo has the most successful breeding program of giraffe in Australasia (herd pictured)

The zoo was created in 1983, on land owned by the state government as a closed-to-the-public, purpose breeding area and endangered species sanctuary. In 1990, a study was undertaken to determine the feasibility of allowing public access to the zoo, and by 1993 it had been developed into a large educational facility, open to the public, with bus and walking tours.

Five major habitat exhibits have been developed, including the Asian steppes, arid north Africa, African plains, and Asian grasslands. The entire zoo is surrounded with vermin-proof fencing to keep the habitat as self-contained as possible. The area is not irrigated, and is populated primarily with native flora to cut down on water consumption and erosion in the semi-arid region. The roads and trails within the zoo are constructed of local materials to keep them low maintenance, and to allow them to be easily re-integrated into the habitat should the need arise. Waste water is recycled, and as much as possible, solar power is used for electric fencing needs.

In late 2019, Monarto Zoo began a three-year project to convert itself into a safari park with luxury resort facilities. As part of the overhaul, it is transitioning its branding to be "Monarto Safari Park" by 2021. Monarto would also become the largest park outside of Africa.

In August 2023, ZoosSA exceeded a fundraising campaign target of 2 million dollars to build a 15-hectare (37-acre) facility at Monarto Safari Park, to house one male and four female Asian elephants from the Auckland Zoo, Perth Zoo, and Taronga Zoo, all of which had announced plans to end housing elephants. Burma, the Auckland Zoo and New Zealand's last elephant, was the first elephant to move to the new complex when she arrived at the Safari Park in November 2024. Permai, Perth Zoo's female elephant, would also make the trip in January 2025 and two more female elephants, Pak Boon and Tang Mo, would join Sydney's Taronga Zoo in May 2025. Finally, in November 2025, Putra Mas, the park's only bull elephant, arrived from Perth Zoo.

=== Giraffe breeding programme ===
As of 2015 Monarto Zoo had achieved one of the most successful giraffe breeding programs in Oceania, and as of 2019 has the most successful giraffe breeding programmes in Australia.

== Animals and conservation efforts ==
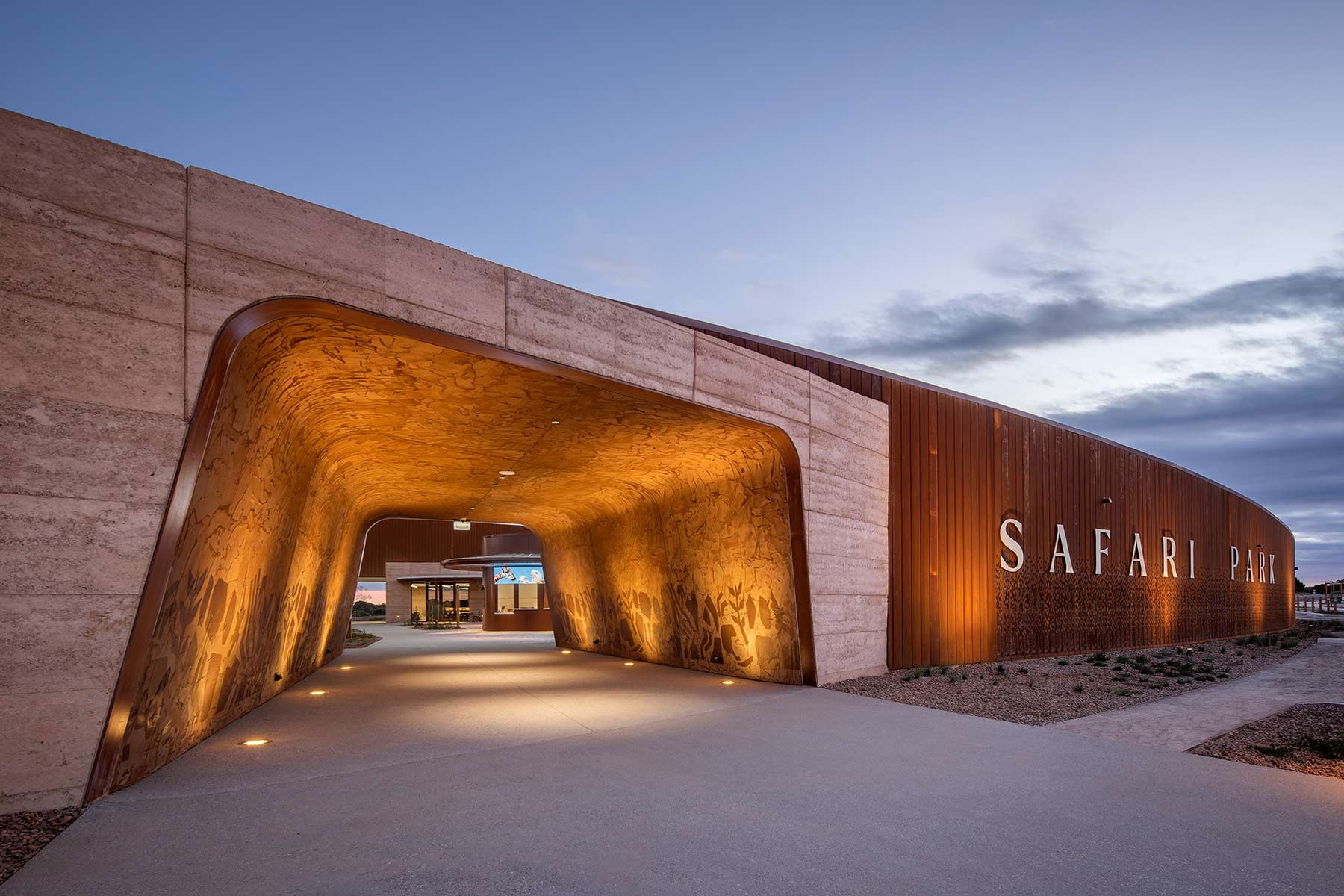
Visitors centre at Monarto

=== Endangered species ===
The zoo is taking part in numerous conservation efforts with endangered species, and has breeding projects for many Australian native species, including bilby, eastern barred bandicoot, Tasmanian devil, warru (black-footed rock-wallaby) and yellow-footed rock-wallaby; as well as many exotic species (and endangered subspecies of some species) including addax, African wild dog, American bison, Barbary sheep, black rhinoceros, Persian fallow deer, Przewalski's horse, scimitar-horned oryx, South African cheetah and southern white rhinoceros.

In 2006, the zoo began a breeding program for Tasmanian devils which are free of facial tumour disease.

Previously widespread throughout the ranges of central Australia, the warru, or black-footed rock-wallaby, is as of July 2019 South Australia's most endangered mammal, primarily due to predation by foxes and feral cats. However Monarto has had some success in breeding the wallabies since the capture of 15 of them in 2007, and has helped to establish a viable population (22) of the wallabies in a 1 square kilometre (0.39 sq mi) fenced area, known as the Pintji, in the Anangu Pitjantjatjara Yankunytjatjara (APY) lands. In June 2017 Monarto announced that 25 of the population bred at Pintji, along with 15 others, had been released into the wild. These will be monitored and feral animal control measures are in place.

=== Ethical products ===
On-site shops and catering facilities at the zoo actively avoid using products containing palm oil. Visitors are encouraged to go palm oil free and provided information on how to go about it.

=== Species list ===
Bird species include

- Emu
- Malleefowl
- Mallee emu-wren
- Ostrich
- Plains-wanderer
- Rufous-crowned emu-wren

Mammal species include

- Addax
- African lion
- African wild dog
- American bison
- Asian elephant
- Barbary sheep
- Bilby
- Black rhinoceros
- Blackbuck
- Bongo
- Boodie
- Cape porcupine
- Chimpanzee
- Common eland
- Eastern barred bandicoot
- Giraffe
- Greater stick-nest rat
- Hippopotamus
- Long-nosed potoroo
- Meerkat
- Nyala
- Persian fallow deer
- Plains zebra
- Przewalski's horse
- Red deer
- Red-tailed phascogale
- Ring-tailed lemur
- Scimitar-horned oryx
- South African cheetah
- Southern white rhinoceros
- Spotted hyena
- Tammar wallaby
- Tasmanian devil
- Warru
- Waterbuck
- Woylie
- Yellow-footed rock-wallaby

Reptile species include

- Adelaide pygmy blue-tongue lizard
- Aldabra giant tortoise
- Leopard tortoise
- Murray Darling carpet python
- Radiated tortoise
- Shingleback lizard
- Western swamp turtle

== See also ==
- Adelaide Zoo
- List of zoos in Australia
