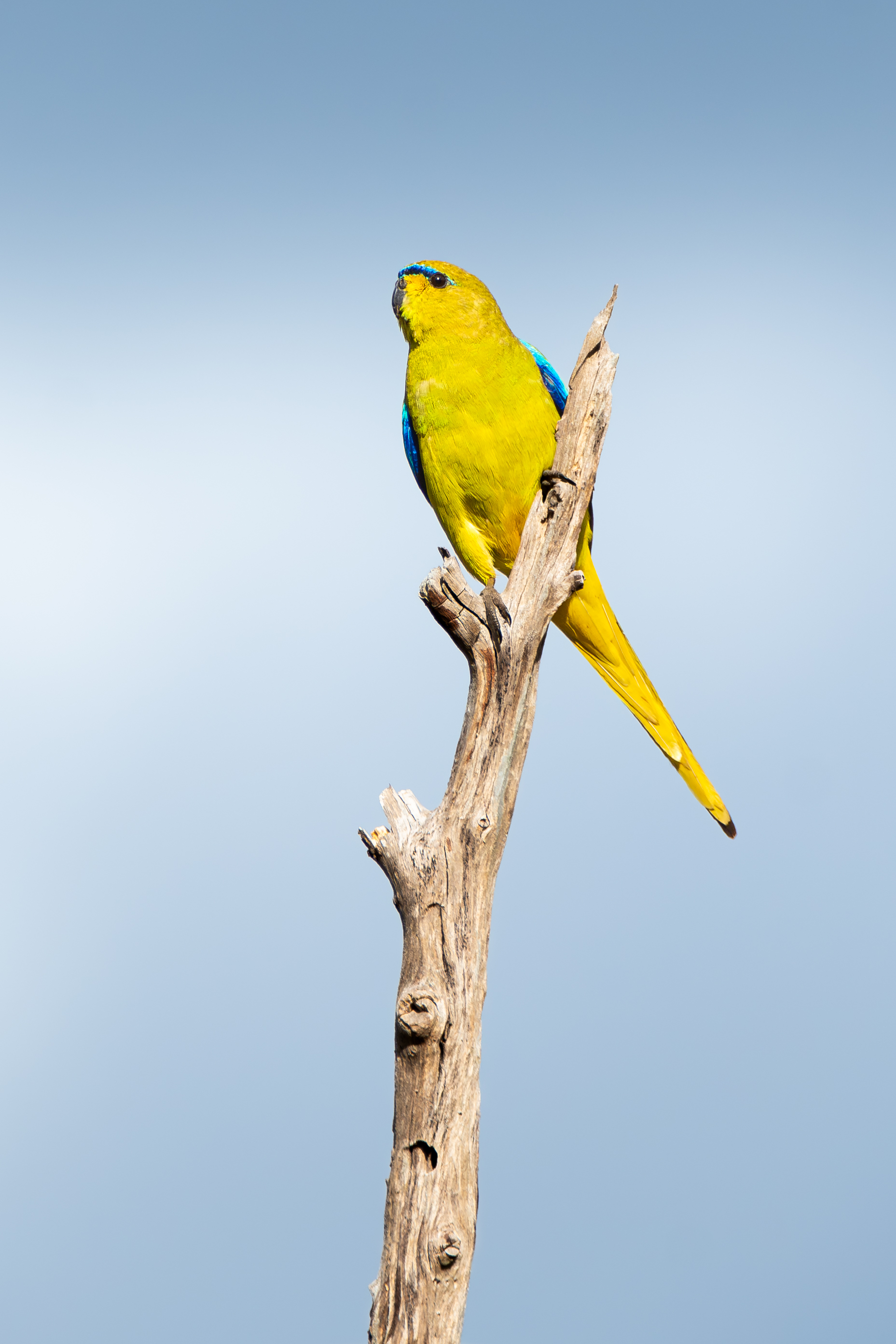
- in the Perth Hills

Conservation status
- Least Concern (IUCN 3.1)

Scientific classification
- Kingdom: Animalia
- Phylum: Chordata
- Class: Aves
- Order: Psittaciformes
- Family: Psittaculidae
- Genus: Neophema
- Species: N. elegans

Binomial name
- Neophema elegans (Gould, 1837)
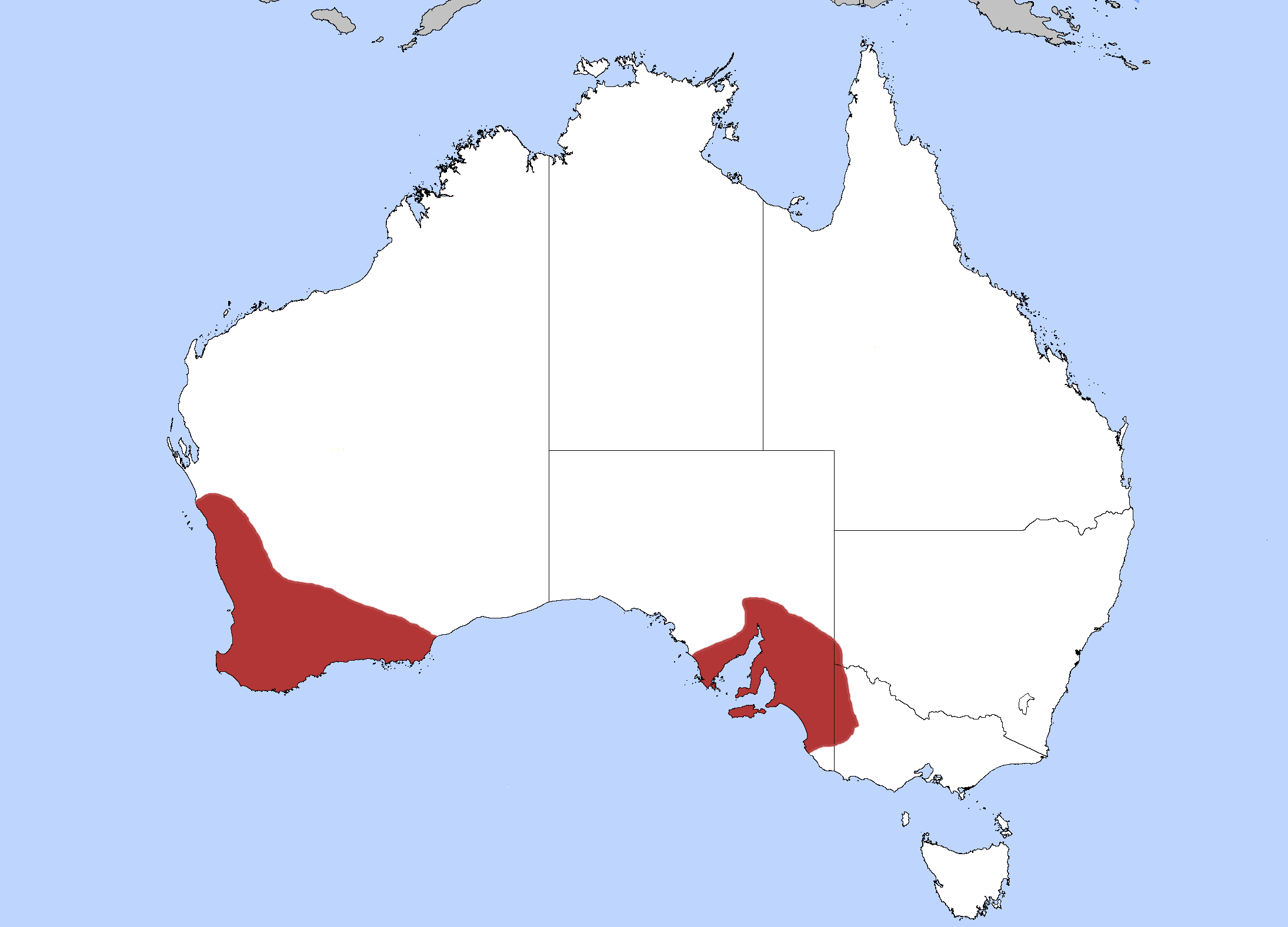
- Distribution of the elegant parrot

= Elegant parrot =

Species of bird

The elegant parrot (Neophema elegans) is a species of parrot in the family Psittaculidae. It is endemic to Australia.

== Naming and taxonomy ==
The elegant parrot was called carteri, bilgir, or koolyederong by Aboriginal peoples. Its English name came from the renowned ornithologist and artist John Gould in 1837, its specific name Latin for "elegant". It is one of six species of grass parrot in the genus Neophema, and within it a member of the subgenus Neonanodes. Its common name is elegant parrot, but it has also been called elegant parakeet, elegant grass parakeet, and grass parrot in the past.

== Description ==
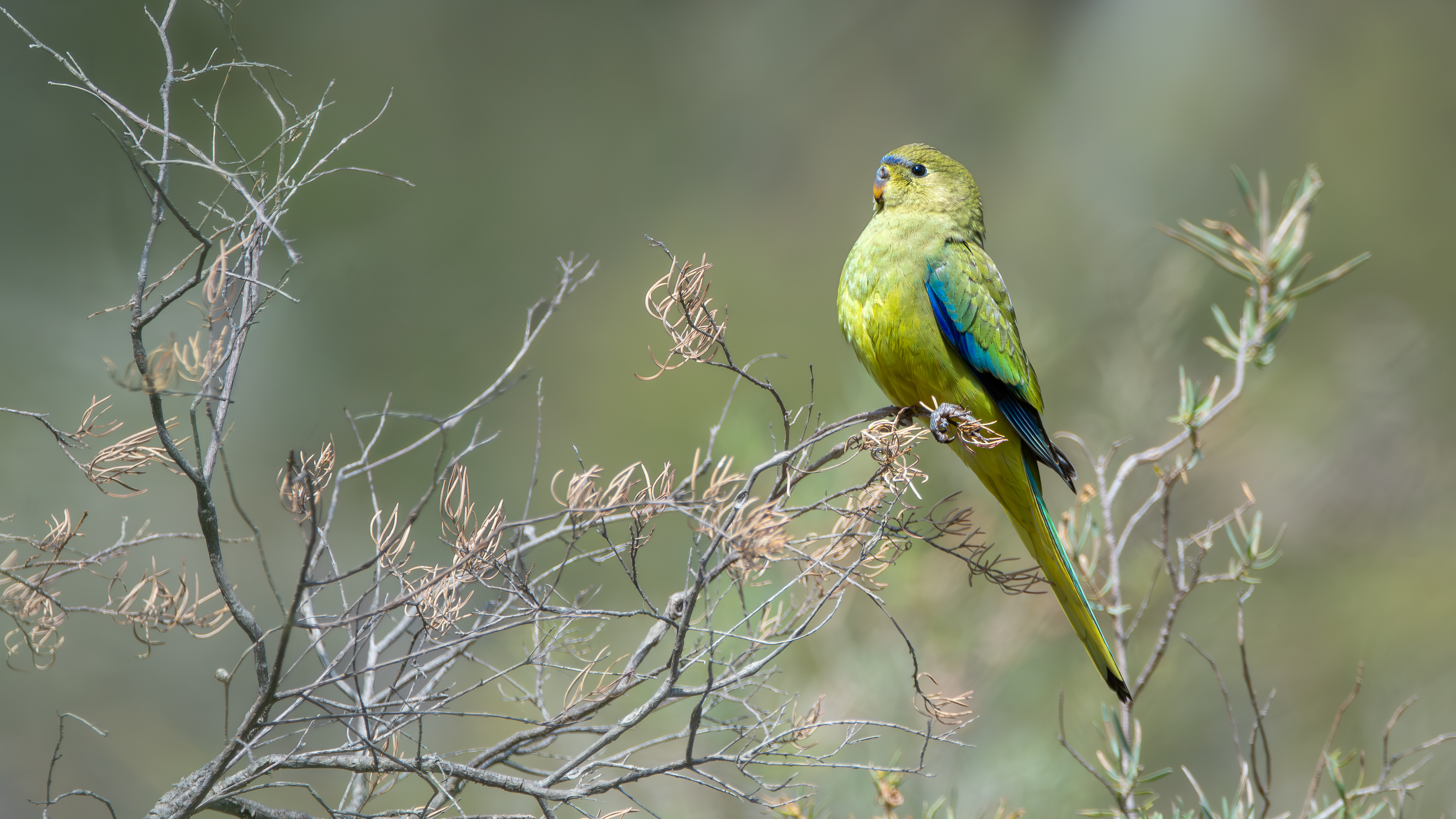
Juvenile elegant parrot (Neophema elegans)

The elegant parrot is 23 cm (9.1 in) long and predominantly golden olive in colour with a dark blue frontal band line above with lighter blue, while abdomen and vent are yellow. The female is a duller shade of olive all over and has a narrower blue frontal band. The wings are predominantly olive with outer flight feathers dark blue. The yellow-edged tail has shades of olive and blue. The bill and legs are grey and the eyes dark brown. Juveniles are duller and lack the frontal bands.

== Distribution and habitat ==
The elegant parrot is found in two disjunct regions, one across southwestern Australia from Moora in the north to Merredin and Esperance in the east, and in southeastern South Australia (including Kangaroo Island) north to Marree, and east into western Victoria.

== Breeding ==
Breeding season is anywhere from July to November or after rainfall, with one or occasionally two broods raised depending on rainfall. A hollow higher than 15 m (49 ft) above the ground in a tree, usually a eucalypt along a watercourse or in a stringybark forest, is utilised for nesting, and a clutch of four to six round white eggs measuring 21 x 18 mm is laid there.

== Gallery ==
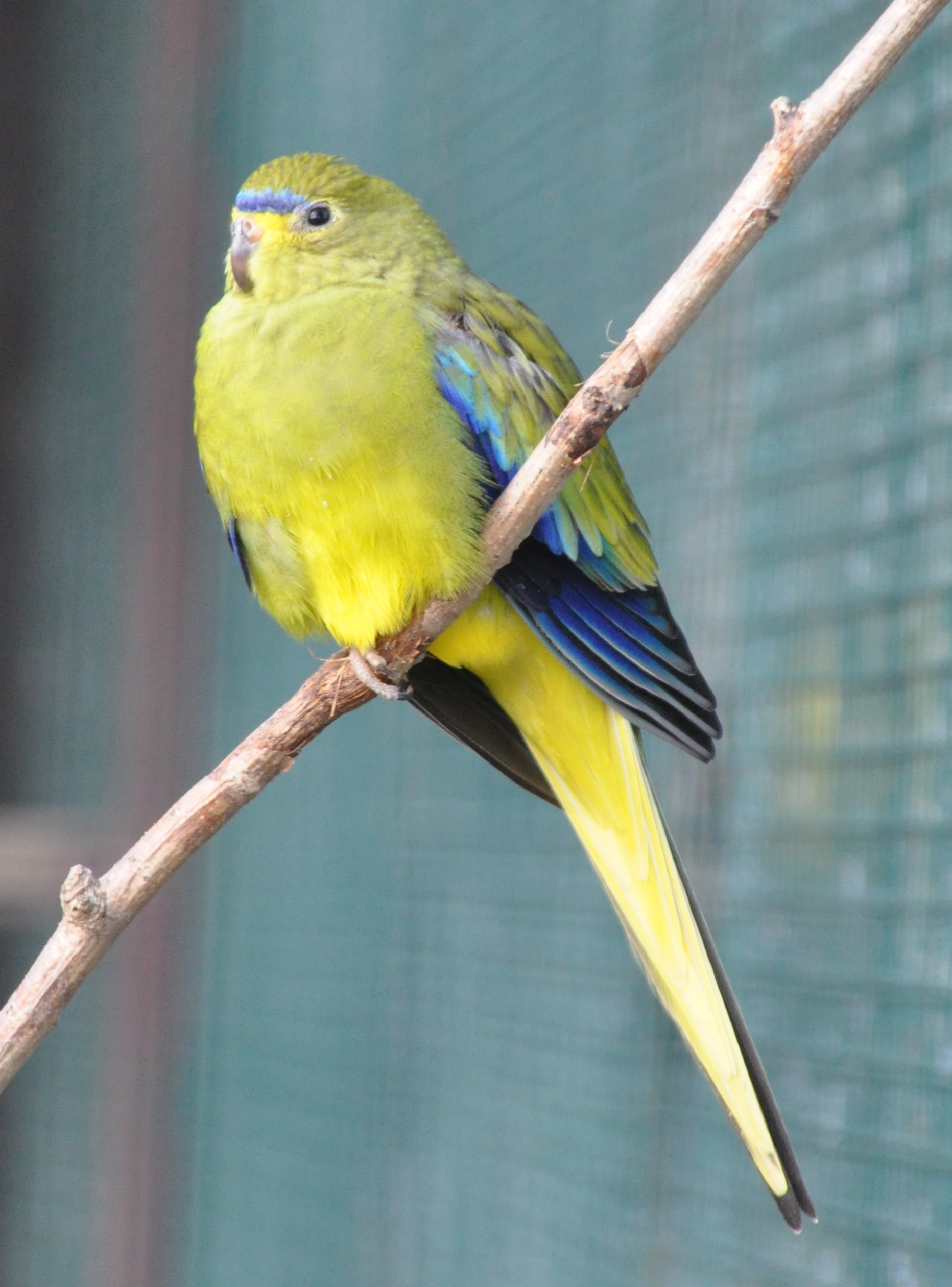
Captive at Walsrode Bird Park, Germany

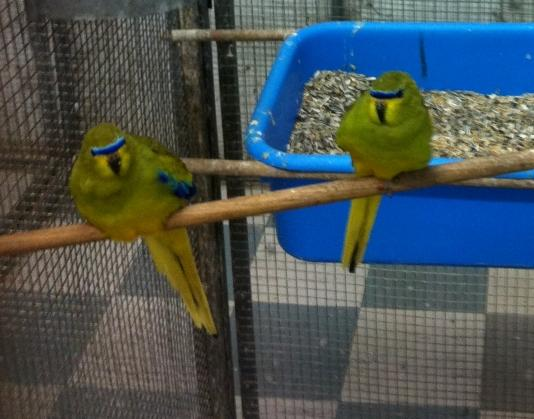
Elegant parrots in captivity

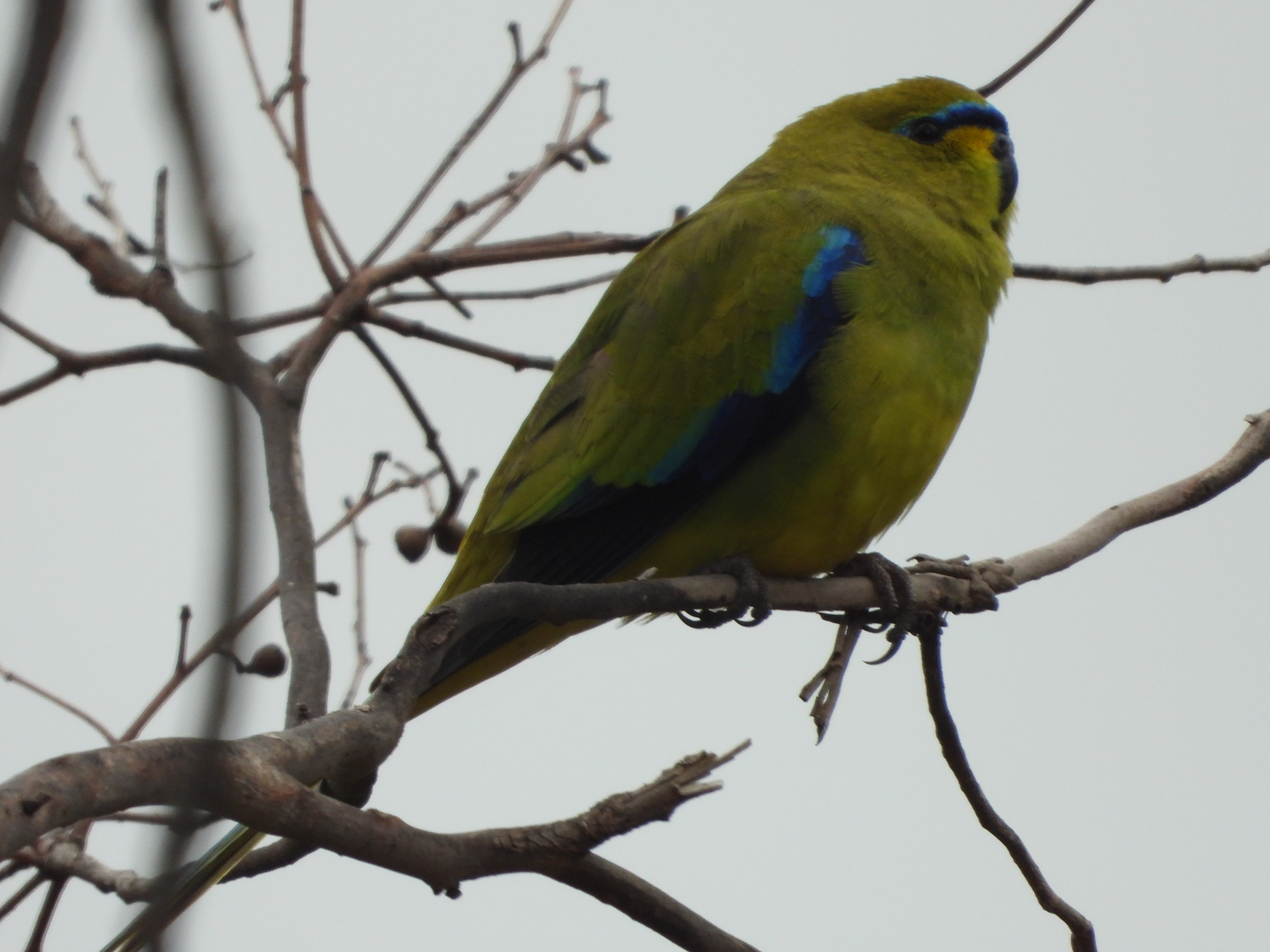
In the wild
