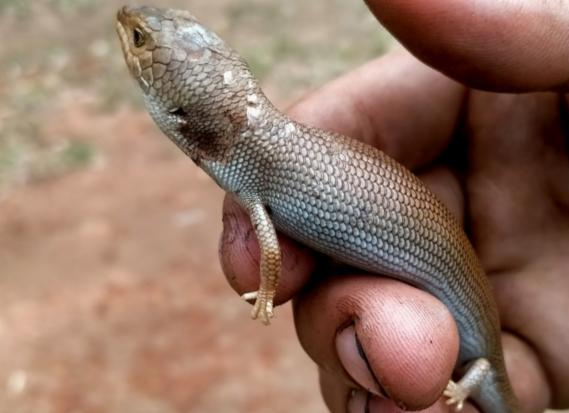

Conservation status
- Endangered (IUCN 3.1)
- CITES Appendix I

Scientific classification
- Kingdom: Animalia
- Phylum: Chordata
- Class: Reptilia
- Order: Squamata
- Family: Scincidae
- Genus: Tiliqua
- Species: T. adelaidensis

Binomial name
- Tiliqua adelaidensis (W. Peters, 1863)

Synonyms
- Cyclodus adelaidensis W. Peters, 1863; Tiliqua adelaidensis — M.A. Smith, 1937

= Adelaide pygmy blue-tongue skink =

Species of lizard

The Adelaide pygmy blue-tongue skink (Tiliqua adelaidensis) or pygmy bluetongue is a species of skink, a lizard in the family Scincidae. The species was previously thought to be extinct and only rediscovered in 1992. Known locations of the species extend from Kapunda in the Light River valley, about 77 kilometres (48 mi) north east of Adelaide, northwards to Peterborough, about 254 kilometres (158 mi) north of Adelaide.

== Rediscovery and conservation ==
Found only in the Mid North of South Australia, T. adelaidensis was for a time believed to be extinct. It was rediscovered in 1992, when a researcher found the remains of an adult male T. adelaidensis in the stomach contents of a dead brown snake, near Burra. The pygmy bluetongue is now considered to be an endangered species.

The habitat and range of pygmy bluetongues is very restricted, as individuals live in old spider burrows within areas of unploughed native grasslands, which have become rare due to extensive development of cereal cropping throughout the region. Since their rediscovery, surveys have estimated that 5,000 to 7,000 individuals live in scattered areas between Kapunda and Peterborough.

Conservation efforts to maintain the species include the establishment of the Tiliqua Pygmy Bluetongue Reserve near Burra, by the Nature Foundation SA in 2010.

In February 2016 Zoos SA announced the first success of a captive breeding program of pygmy bluetongues at Monarto Zoo.

In January 2020 researchers at Flinders University won an Australian Research Council Linkage Projects grant of more than A$400,000 for a five-year project aimed at saving the lizard from extinction due to climate change. The study involves relocating about 100 lizards into a large holding pen on a sheep farm at Tarlee, about 90 kilometres (56 mi) north of Adelaide, which is a few degrees cooler than the most northerly habitat of the species.

== Ecology ==
When artificial burrows were offered in the field to T. adelaidensis lizards, all the lizards preferred vertical rather than angled burrows and juvenile lizards preferred more shallow burrows than did adult lizards. Observation of 36 artificial burrows showed a significant increase in lizard numbers during 2001–2002 and over three surveys. The study suggests that this local increase in population could be due to lizards locating appropriate burrows much easier. The study results suggest that artificial burrows could be a tool for conservation management of this species.

Another study compared the fitness of female lizards in natural burrows and artificial ones, over a three-year period. The study showed that the female in the artificial burrows had a better body condition, and produced larger offspring with better body conditions.
