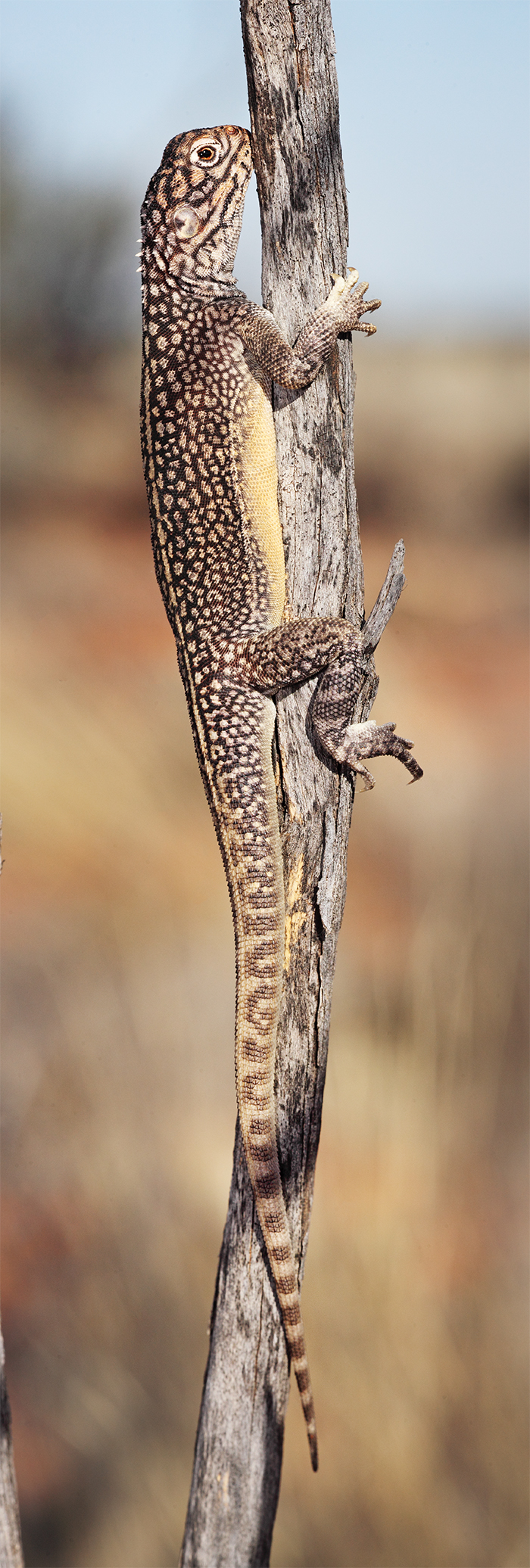

Conservation status
- Least Concern (IUCN 3.1)

Scientific classification
- Domain: Eukaryota
- Kingdom: Animalia
- Phylum: Chordata
- Class: Reptilia
- Order: Squamata
- Suborder: Iguania
- Family: Agamidae
- Genus: Ctenophorus
- Species: C. nuchalis

Binomial name
- Ctenophorus nuchalis (De vis, 1884)
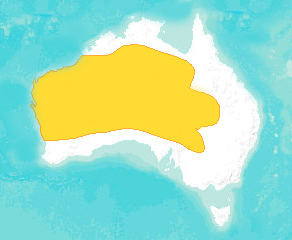
- Distribution of the central netted dragon

= Central netted dragon =

Species of lizard

The central netted dragon or central netted ground dragon (Ctenophorus nuchalis) is a species of agamid lizard occurring in a wide range of arid to semiarid regions of Australia. It is widespread across the continent, commonly found in open, sandy, desert habitats. It is a popular pet and can often be found in zoos.

== Description ==
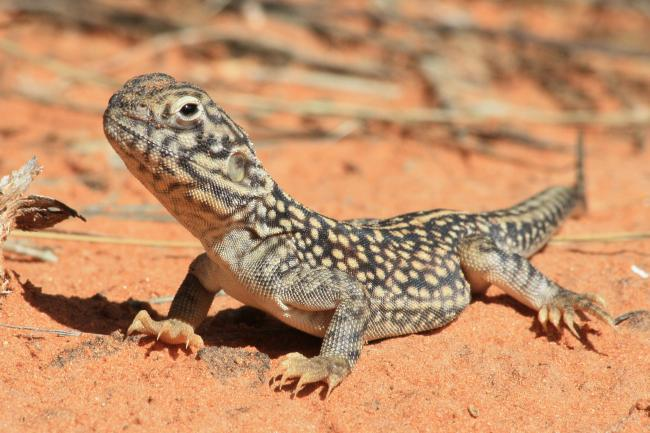
Central netted dragon

The central netted dragon is a medium-sized terrestrial lizard with a pale reddish-brown to bright orange-brown body. It gets its name from the dark-chocolate brown, reticulated (net-like) pattern which overlays its head and body. This pattern acts as camouflage, helping the lizard to blend in with its habitat to avoid predators. Its limbs are short and strong, with long toes and strong claws, which allow it to run at great speeds and dig burrows.

The head is short and blunt in comparison to other iguanids and agamids, thought to be related to its herbivorous and burrowing behaviour. The ears are exposed, and a row of enlarged scales curves under each eye. Small spines surround the head. It has a low crest along the top of the neck, a narrow vertebral stripe along the length of the body, and the scales of the body are small and smooth to the touch.

Adult males measure around 25–28 cm from snout to tail, with about 10 cm being snout-to-vent length, and the tail making up the remainder of the length. They are sexually dimorphic, with males being slightly larger overall and having a larger head in relation to their bodies compared to females. This dragon is relatively short- lived in the wild, perhaps living 2-4 yr.

== Taxonomy ==
Charles Walter De Vis first identified Ctenophorus nuchalis in 1884. The Ctenophorus (comb-bearing dragons) genus contains the most diverse group of dragons in Australia. Many of these have been grouped by a similar morphology.

Several synonyms exist for this species:

- Amphibolurus inermis (De Vis, 1888)
- Amphibolurus nuchalis (De Vis, 1884)
- Amphibolurus reticulatus (Sternfeld, 1919)
- Grammatophora inermis (De Vis, 1888)
- Macrops nuchalis (De Vis, 1884)

== Distribution ==
Central netted dragons are found throughout the desert plains of Western Australia, the Northern Territory, Western Queensland and New South Wales. They are abundant in open, sandy areas with sparse vegetation, and surveys have found this species increases in abundance in grazed areas and likewise may increase in cleared or burnt areas.

== Ecology and habitat ==
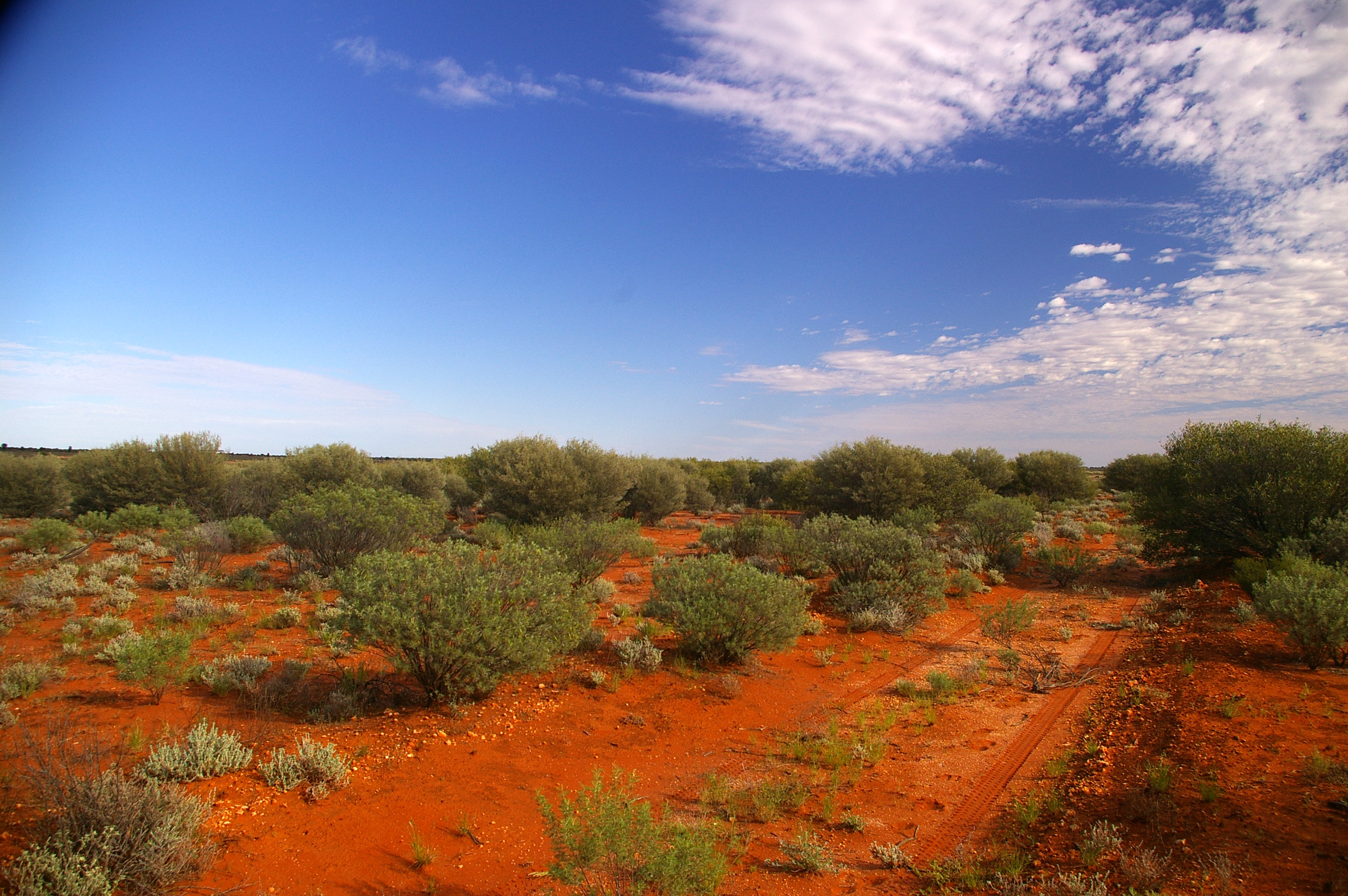
Example of habitat of the central netted dragon

Central netted dragons are burrowing, diurnal (day-active), and terrestrial (ground-dwelling), spending their days basking on logs, stones and termite mounds. Like the majority of reptiles, they are ectotherms, relying on their environment to regulate their body temperature (that averages 36.1 °C). A dragon's day will start with basking in the sun to raise its body temperature to gain energy. Without adequate body heat, these lizards cannot digest their food. When the desert temperature peaks in the middle of the day, they will either retreat to their burrows to cool down, or climb plants to escape the extreme heat.

They are known to have several burrows, typically six to eight, often constructed at the base of stumps of living spinifex (Triodia) grasses, or within hillocks such as those formed by dead grass hummocks. These tend to be relatively shallow, dead-end burrows in different parts of their home range, and are used primarily as nocturnal retreats and for predator escape. They will often back-fill the entrance to this burrow to prevent entry by predators, and to keep the heat out. They prefer perches with high vantage points, such as termite mounds (which also serve as a source of food for this insectivore), dirt hills, logs, and fence posts.

Vegetation cover is an important part of the ecology of the central netted dragon. The species predominates in areas of low vegetation, for example, following a period of drought when Spinifex has died back and ground cover is sparse (<10%).

As with many of the dragon species, central netted dragons will communicate with other members of their species by bobbing their heads and waving their legs. Males can be quite territorial, and will use these display signs to intimidate rival males, in an attempt to ward off any potential takeover bids.

== Reproduction ==
Central netted dragons are oviparous, meaning they lay eggs rather than give birth to live offspring. Females are known to lay two or three clutches of two to six eggs, typically during spring and summer depending on the location and conditions. During the breeding season, male dragons actively defend territories and often fight with other males for dominance.

They have annual lifecycles, with adults predominating during the breeding season and juveniles predominating in other seasons. Juveniles typically attain sexual maturity after winter at 5-6 mo of age. The timing of reproduction is dictated primarily by rainfall, with breeding occurring predictably after winter rains in the southern part of its range, and in late summer following cyclonic rains in the Pilbara region further north. It may also breed in spring in the latter region, but only if winter rain has been substantial. Rainfall appears to be tied to enhanced survival, growth, and possibly clutch size and hatching success.

== Diet ==
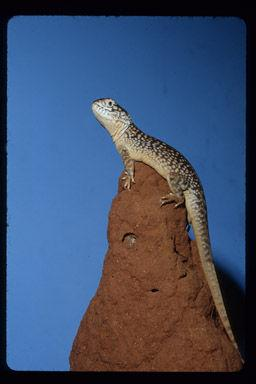
Perched on a termite mound

Central netted dragons have varied diets, consuming mostly insects, but also flowers and other vegetation. They actively hunt, but more often wait for an insect to pass by before striking. In the wild, this dragon's diet consists of 75% insect prey and 25% vegetation, including hogweed (Zaleya galericulata) and small flowers, such as aster, daisy and dandelion. It is one of the most herbivorous of Australian desert lizards. Its diet overlaps broadly with that of many other lizards, and it frequently occurs in sympatry with up to 20-30 other reptilian species. Much of its preferred insect prey are primarily found in microhabitats and on bare sand, a large reason why the success of this species relies on low vegetative ground cover.

== Predators ==
Predators of the central netted dragon include larger reptiles, such as goannas and snakes, and birds of prey, as well as the red fox and cats. Burrows act as the primary mechanism of escape, but may facilitate some predators, such as snakes and digging lizards, since burrows are usually simple dead ends.

== Threats ==
This species is tolerant of habitat degradation caused by grazing and is under no major threats at this time.

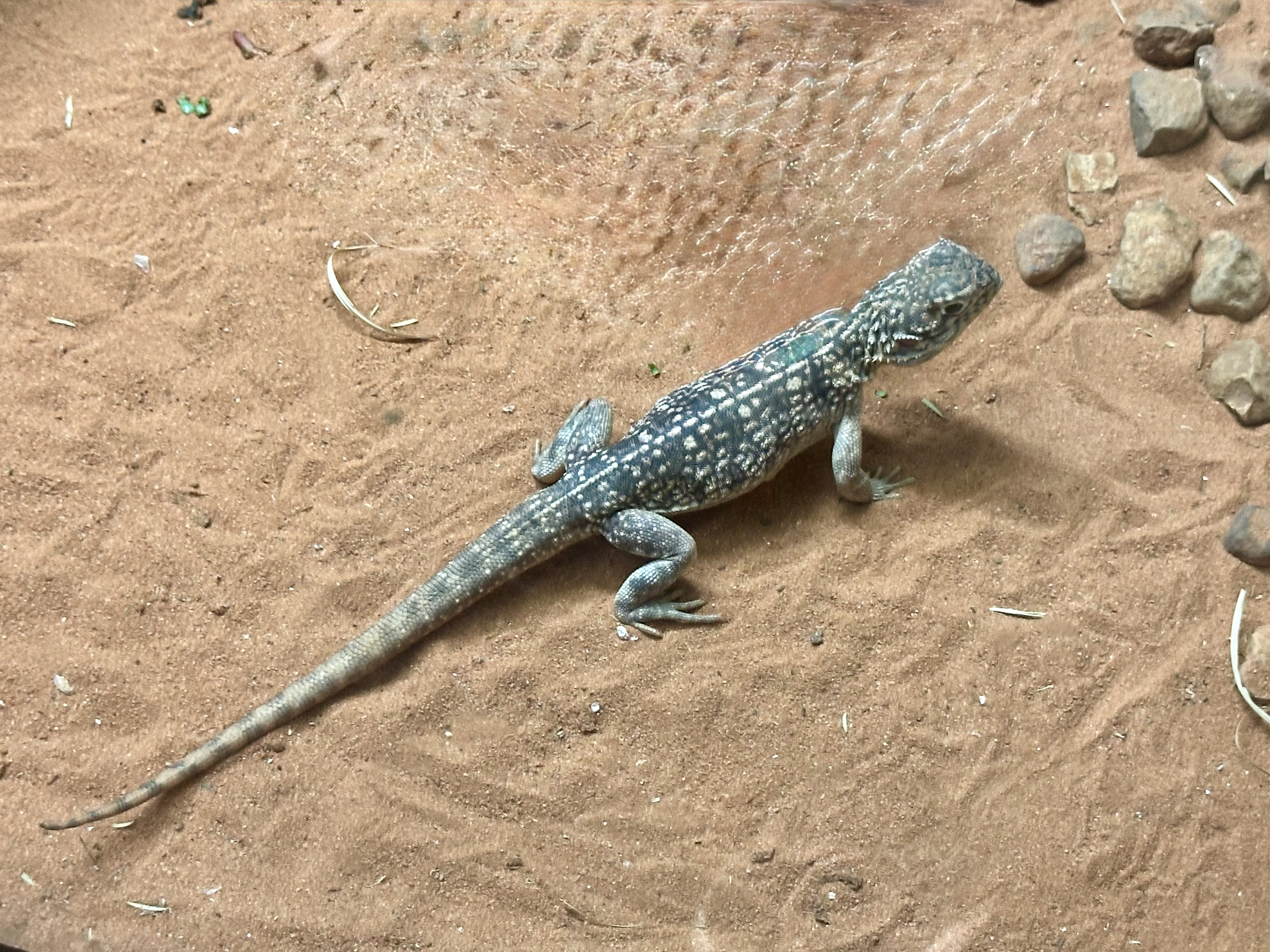
Central Netted Dragon (Ctenophorus nuchalis)
