= Royal Zoological Society of South Australia =

Australian organisation that operates two zoos

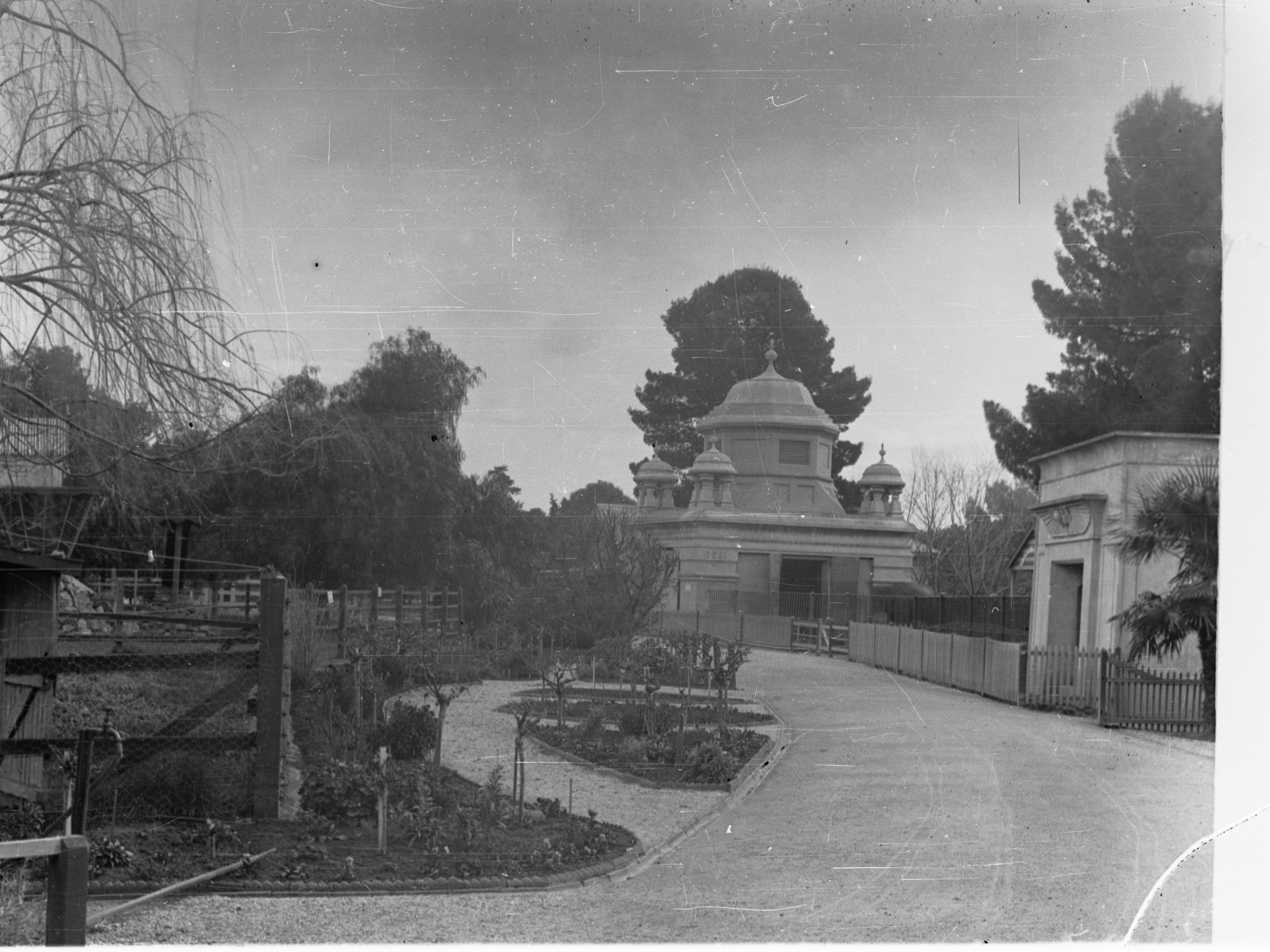
- The entrance to the Adelaide Zoological Gardens, circa 1925
- Founded: 9 August 1878
- Founder: Augustus Short
- Purpose: Wildlife conservation, education, research
- Location: Adelaide, South Australia
- Region served: South Australia
- Key people: Elaine Bensted (CEO)
- Website: www.zoossa.com.au

The Royal Zoological Society of South Australia (commonly known as "Zoos SA") is a non-profit organisation dedicated to the conservation of wildlife and their habitats, education, and research. The society is located in Adelaide, South Australia, and it operates two zoos in South Australia: Adelaide Zoo and Monarto Safari Park.

== History ==
The society was founded, initially under the name of "the Acclimatisation Society of South Australia", on 9 August 1878 by a group of prominent Adelaide citizens led by Augustus Short, the first Anglican Bishop of Adelaide. He believed that a society dedicated to the study and conservation of animals was needed to ensure their survival. The society was established with the aim of creating a zoo and botanical garden in Adelaide, which would be used for scientific research, recreation, and education. The name was changed to "SA Zoological and Acclimatisation Society" in 1882. The society was granted royal patronage by King George VI in 1937, in celebration of the society's Diamond Jubilee, and the name was changed again to "The Royal Zoological Society of South Australia".

The Adelaide Zoo was opened on 23 May 1883 with 37 mammals, 1 reptile, and 36 bird species. Since then, the society has been responsible for the care of the animals at the zoo, as well as the development of the zoo's facilities and exhibits. According to ABC News, "the zoo has undergone significant expansion and renovation since its opening, and now covers an area of 8 hectares (20 acres). The zoo is home to over 2,500 animals representing more than 250 species."

In 1966, the society appointed an Education Officer, who started lessons and offered facilities to the Education Department. The Education Building was set up on site in 1978. The Education Service later moved into the Westpac Envirodome, where by 2009 it employed five full-time staff and services about 55,000 students each year.

In 1983, the society opened Monarto Zoo (now called Monarto Safari Park), located approximately 70 kilometres east of Adelaide. Monarto Zoo covers an area of over 1,500 hectares and is home to over 500 animals from more than 50 species. The zoo is operated by the RZSSA and is dedicated to the conservation of Australian and exotic wildlife.

== Activities ==
The RZSSA is involved in a variety of activities related to animal conservation and education. The society operates two zoos in South Australia, the Adelaide Zoo and Monarto Safari Park (previously known as Monarto Zoo).

The Adelaide Zoo is home to over 1,800 animals from 300 different species. The zoo is open to the public and offers a range of educational programs and events.

Monarto Zoo covers an area of over 1,500 hectares and offers visitors the opportunity to see a wide range of animals in a natural setting. The zoo also offers a range of educational programs and events, as well as guided tours and animal encounters.

The society is involved in a wide range of activities related to wildlife conservation, education, and research. The society's conservation programs focus on protecting endangered species and their habitats, both in Australia and overseas. According to ABC News, "the society also operates a number of captive breeding programs, aimed at increasing the population of endangered species."

The RZSSA has a research committee that provides funding for research projects related to animal conservation and management. In 2018, the society launched a new $40 million, 10-year conservation program aimed at saving 20 South Australian threatened species from extinction. The program, called the South Australian Conservation Ark, will focus on habitat restoration, feral animal control, and captive breeding programs. According to ABC News, the program "is a partnership between the Royal Zoological Society of South Australia, the South Australian government, and Zoos SA."

In addition to its conservation and research activities, the RZSSA also operates a number of education programs with a focus on promoting public awareness of wildlife conservation issues, and advancing scientific knowledge of animal behaviour and biology. The society offers guided tours of both the Adelaide and Monarto zoos, as well as a range of educational programs and resources for teachers and students. The society operates a range of educational programs for schools and the general public, and also provides support for research projects in a variety of fields, including animal behaviour, ecology, and genetics. According to The Advertiser, "the society provides a range of education programs for school children, which includes zoo visits, interactive workshops, and teacher resources."

In 2022, the society announced plans to build a new state-of-the-art animal hospital and wildlife rehabilitation centre at the Adelaide Zoo. The $25 million project will be funded through a combination of government grants and private donations, and will provide veterinary care for the zoo's animals as well as injured and orphaned wildlife from across South Australia. According to The Advertiser, "the new hospital and rehabilitation centre will include animal housing, treatment areas, and a quarantine facility, and will be capable of treating a wide range of animals, from small birds to large mammals."

== Governance ==
The Royal Zoological Society of South Australia is governed by a board of directors, led by the society's CEO, Elaine Bensted. The board is responsible for overseeing the society's operations and setting its strategic direction. The society is also supported by a range of committees and advisory groups, which provide expertise and guidance on specific issues related to wildlife conservation, education, and research. These include the Animal Welfare Committee, the Conservation and Research Committee, and the Education and Interpretation Committee.

The society is a full institutional member of the Zoo and Aquarium Association and the World Association of Zoos and Aquariums.

== Funding ==
The Royal Zoological Society of South Australia is a non-profit organisation, and relies on a variety of sources for funding. These include government grants, corporate sponsorships, private donations, and revenue generated through the Adelaide Zoo. In recent years, the society has received significant government funding to support its conservation and research programs. In 2021, the South Australian government announced a $2 million funding package for the society's South Australian Conservation Ark program, aimed at saving 20 threatened species from extinction. The society also receives corporate support from a range of companies, including major partners such as Santos and BHP. The Adelaide Zoo is a major tourist attraction in South Australia, and generates significant revenue through ticket sales, memberships, and other visitor activities.

== See also ==
- Adelaide Zoo
- Monarto Safari Park
- List of zoos in Australia
