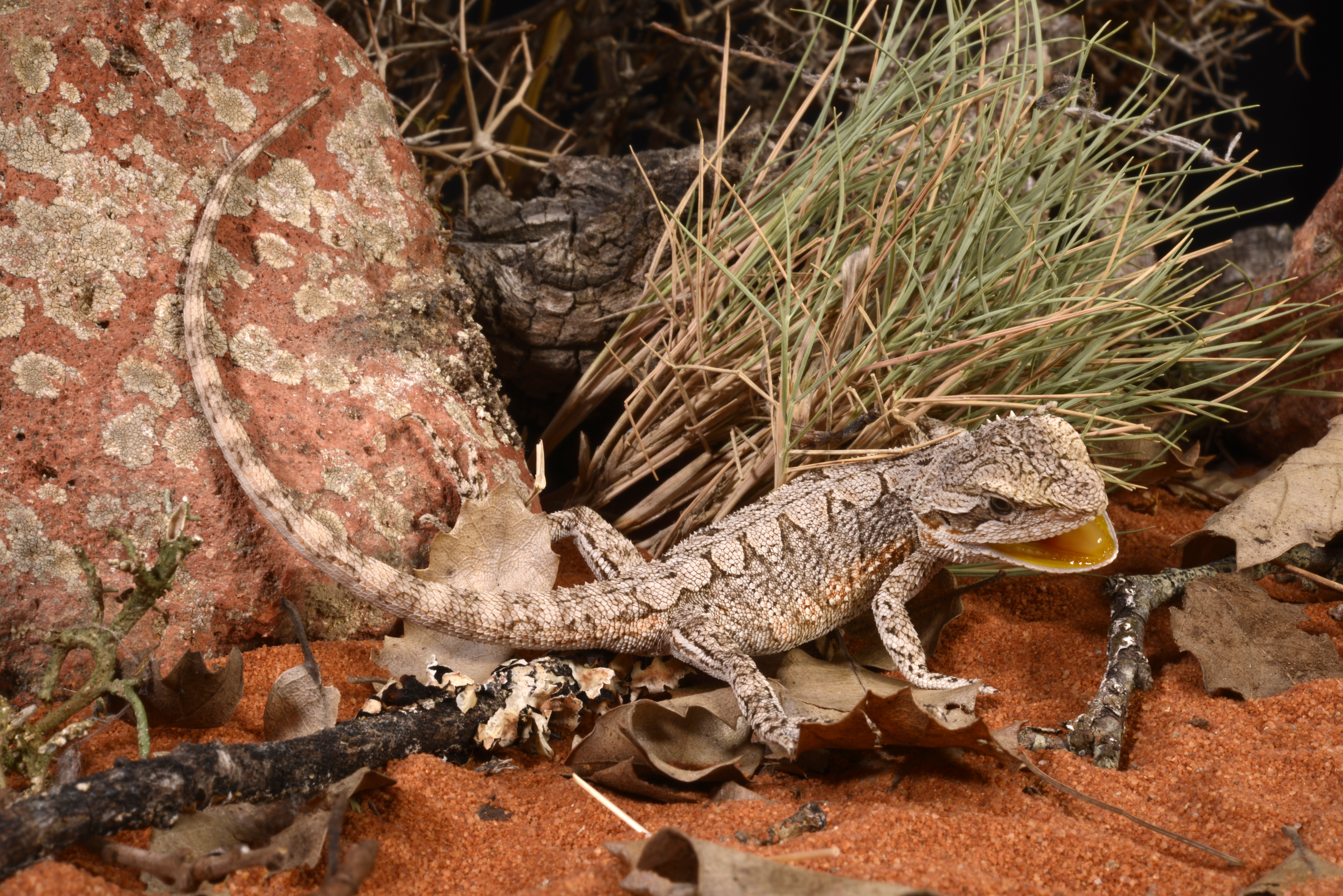

Conservation status
- Least Concern (IUCN 3.1)

Scientific classification
- Kingdom: Animalia
- Phylum: Chordata
- Class: Reptilia
- Order: Squamata
- Suborder: Iguania
- Family: Agamidae
- Genus: Pogona
- Species: P. minor

Binomial name
- Pogona minor (Sternfeld, 1919)

Subspecies
- Three, see text.

Synonyms
- Amphibolurus barbatus minor Sternfeld, 1919; Pogona barbata minor (Sternfeld, 1919); Amphibolurus minor (Sternfeld, 1919)

= Pogona minor =

Western bearded dragon

Species of lizard

Pogona minor is a species of agamid lizard from a group commonly known as bearded dragons, and is found on the southwest coast and interior of Western Australia. The species Pogona minor includes the widespread nominotypical subspecies Pogona minor minor, commonly known as the western bearded dragon, which is widespread across Western Australia between the Pilbara and the south coast, and the subspecies Pogona minor minima, which is confined to the Wallabi Group of islands. There is another subspecies, Pogona minor mitchelli, which lives in tropical woodlands of the Kimberley area of Western Australia.

== Description ==
Pogona minor minor is 15 cm (5.9 in) in snout-to-vent length (SVL) (and 38 cm (15 in) in total length, tail included). P. m. minima is slightly smaller, at 11 cm (4.3 in) SVL, and P. m. mitchelli is slightly larger at 16 cm (6.3 in) SVL. All bearded dragons have a chameleon-like colour, either blending into their environments or presenting brighter displays during interaction with others. They are similar in appearance to Pogona nullarbor and Caimanops amphiboluroides (mulga dragon), but are distinguished by a smaller head, and the arrangement of spines on the underside and neck.

== Geographic distribution ==
The western bearded dragon is widespread in Southwest Australia and central deserts; the range includes semiarid regions such as woodland or heathland, and arid desert or coastal dunes. This subspecies also occurs on Dirk Hartog Island. Pogona minor minima is found on West, North, and East Wallabi Islands, Houtman Abrolhos.

== Behavior ==
Pogona minor displays a behavior common to other Pogona species. It will wave one of its fore legs to trigger a response from a potential rival or mate. Another typical behavior is head-bobbing amongst males, perhaps related to dominance within the social order. It is often seen basking on fence posts.

== Reproduction ==
Pogona minor is oviparous. The adult female usually lays a clutch of 5–9 eggs, though clutches of up to 15 have been recorded.

== Diet ==
Due to its small size, it is likely that Pogona minor is insectivorous unlike most other bearded dragon species which are omnivorous.

== Subspecies ==
The following three subspecies of Pogona minor are recognized as being valid.

- Pogona minor minima (Loveridge, 1933)
- Pogona minor minor (Sternfeld, 1919)
- Pogona minor mitchelli (Badham, 1976)

Nota bene: A trinomial authority in parentheses indicates that the subspecies was oroginally described in a genus other than Pogona.

== Etymology ==
The subspecific name, mitchelli, is in honor of Australian herpetologist Francis John Mitchell.

== See also ==
- Bearded dragon
- List of reptiles of Western Australia
