= Mulga dragon =

Conservation status
- Least Concern (IUCN 3.1)

Scientific classification
- Kingdom: Animalia
- Phylum: Chordata
- Class: Reptilia
- Order: Squamata
- Suborder: Iguania
- Family: Agamidae
- Genus: Diporiphora
- Species: D. amphiboluroides

Binomial name
- Diporiphora amphiboluroides Lucas & Frost, 1902

Species of lizard

The mulga dragon (Diporiphora amphiboluroides) is a species of agamid lizard found in Western Australia. The species is up to 250 mm long, the length from snout to vent is 95 mm, with a long, slender tail that ends abruptly. The patterning over the legs and body is grey and brownish streaks. This provides an excellent camouflage on mulga trees, its usual habitat, it is also found beneath mulga leaf litter. Diporiphora amphiboluroides generally remains motionless and unobserved, this allows it to operate as an ambush predator and elude animals that would prey on it.

It resembles another Western Australian species, the western bearded dragon (Pogona minor).
