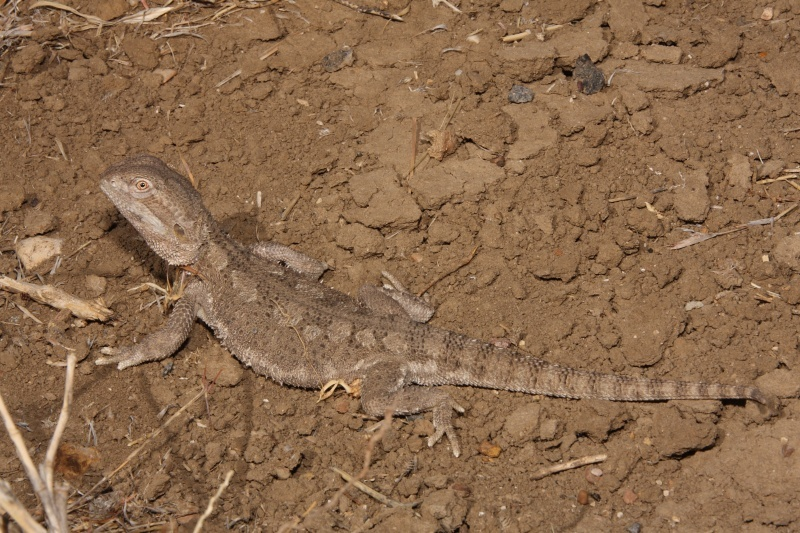
- In Queensland.

Conservation status
- Least Concern (IUCN 3.1)

Scientific classification
- Kingdom: Animalia
- Phylum: Chordata
- Class: Reptilia
- Order: Squamata
- Suborder: Iguania
- Family: Agamidae
- Genus: Pogona
- Species: P. henrylawsoni

Binomial name
- Pogona henrylawsoni Wells and Wellington, 1985

= Rankin's dragon =

Species of lizard

Rankin's dragon (Pogona henrylawsoni) is a species of Australian agamid lizard. It may also be called the pygmy bearded dragon , black-soiled bearded dragon or downs bearded dragon.

The specific epithet, henrylawsoni, is in honor of the Australian author, poet, and philosopher Henry Lawson.

== Range ==
It is native to Queensland in Australia, but can be found in captivity across the world.

== Description ==
P. henrylawsoni is similar to the larger central bearded dragon (P. vitticeps), but is usually less than 30 cm (12 in) in total length (including tail), with a shorter and more blunt snout.

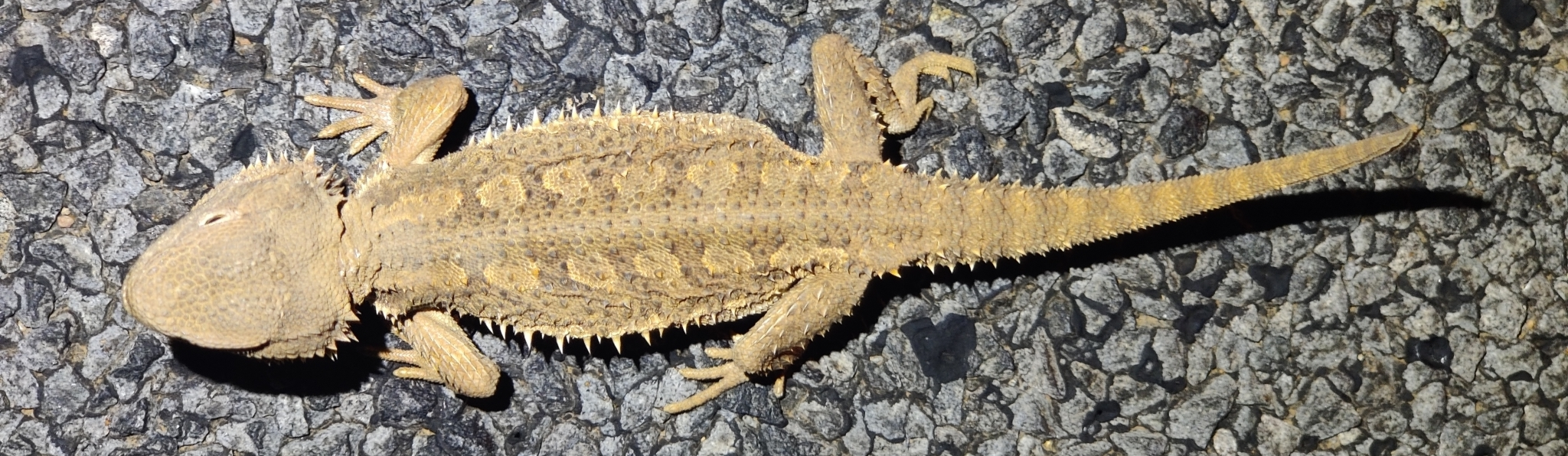
Showing dorsal patterns

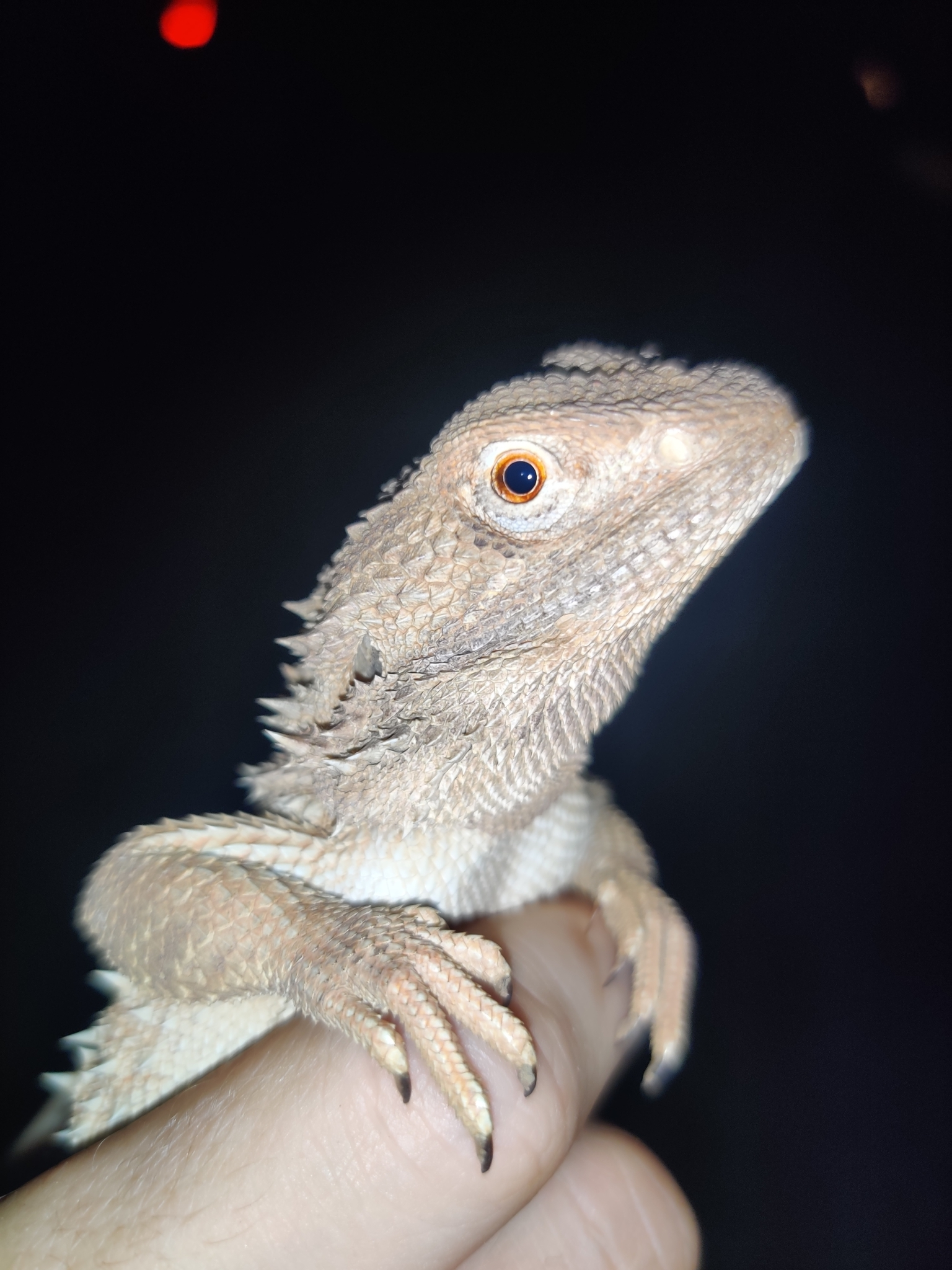
Closeup

== Common names ==
P. henrylawsoni is also commonly called Lawson's dragon, dumpy dragon, pygmy dragon, black soil bearded dragon or Pogona brevis.

== Taxonomy ==
A formal description was not published for this lizard until 1985, despite being known to herpetologists. The scientific name for this species was disputed, along with the other taxonomic treatments of Wells and Wellington, but was published again by Harold Cogger (2000) and others as a valid name.

The name is noted as invalid in some sources, and given as a synonym for Pogona brevis.

== In captivity ==
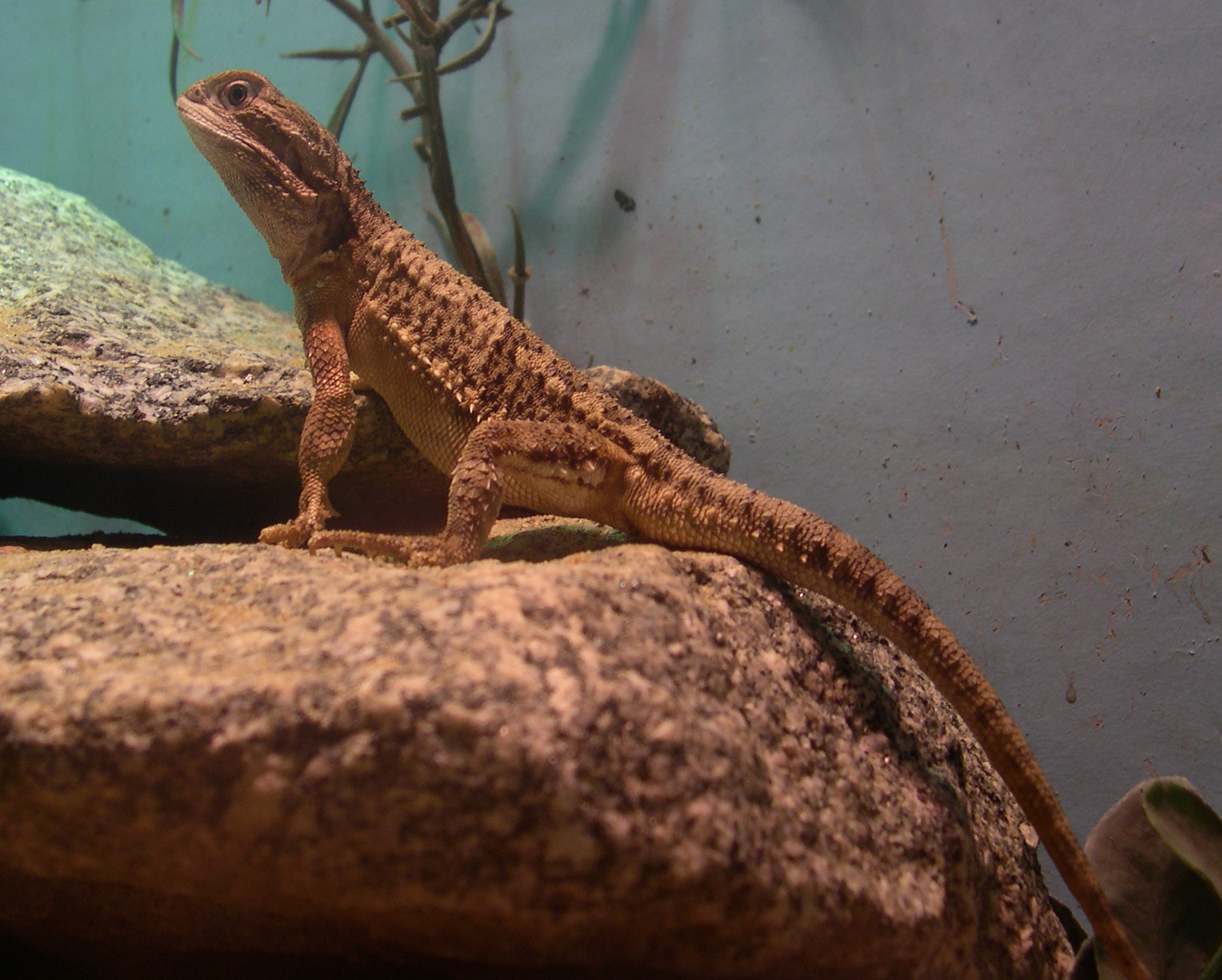
At Diergaarde Blijdorp, in Rotterdam

P. henrylawsoni has a life span of 10 to 15 years in captivity, and its natural environment is hot, dry, and rocky, which must be mimicked in captivity. The Rankin's dragon requires a minimum of 40 gallons and a hide, as well as multiple places to climb. It is a more social species compared to the Pogona vitticeps and as such can be cohabited much easier. Males will not tolerate one another like most lizard species. It (with supervision) can be handled by children, but it does not like to be restricted or turned upside down, and will struggle when it is. Most specimens outside of Australia in captivity are descendants of dragons illegally exported in the 1980s. It is generally used as a substitute for Pogona vitticeps, the most common species of bearded dragon in captivity. The Rankin's dragon is similar in personality, yet smaller and more manageable, where there is a lack of space and resources. The only issue is the small gene pool within captive populations, being unable to be supplemented by wild individuals from Australia, whereas deformation of the spine is occurring. It is also a common pet among lizard owners.
