= Pogona microlepidota =

Conservation status
- Least Concern (IUCN 3.1)

Scientific classification
- Kingdom: Animalia
- Phylum: Chordata
- Class: Reptilia
- Order: Squamata
- Suborder: Iguania
- Family: Agamidae
- Genus: Pogona
- Species: P. microlepidota

Binomial name
- Pogona microlepidota (Glauert, 1952)

Species of lizard

Pogona microlepidota, the Kimberley bearded dragon, is a species of agama found in Australia.
