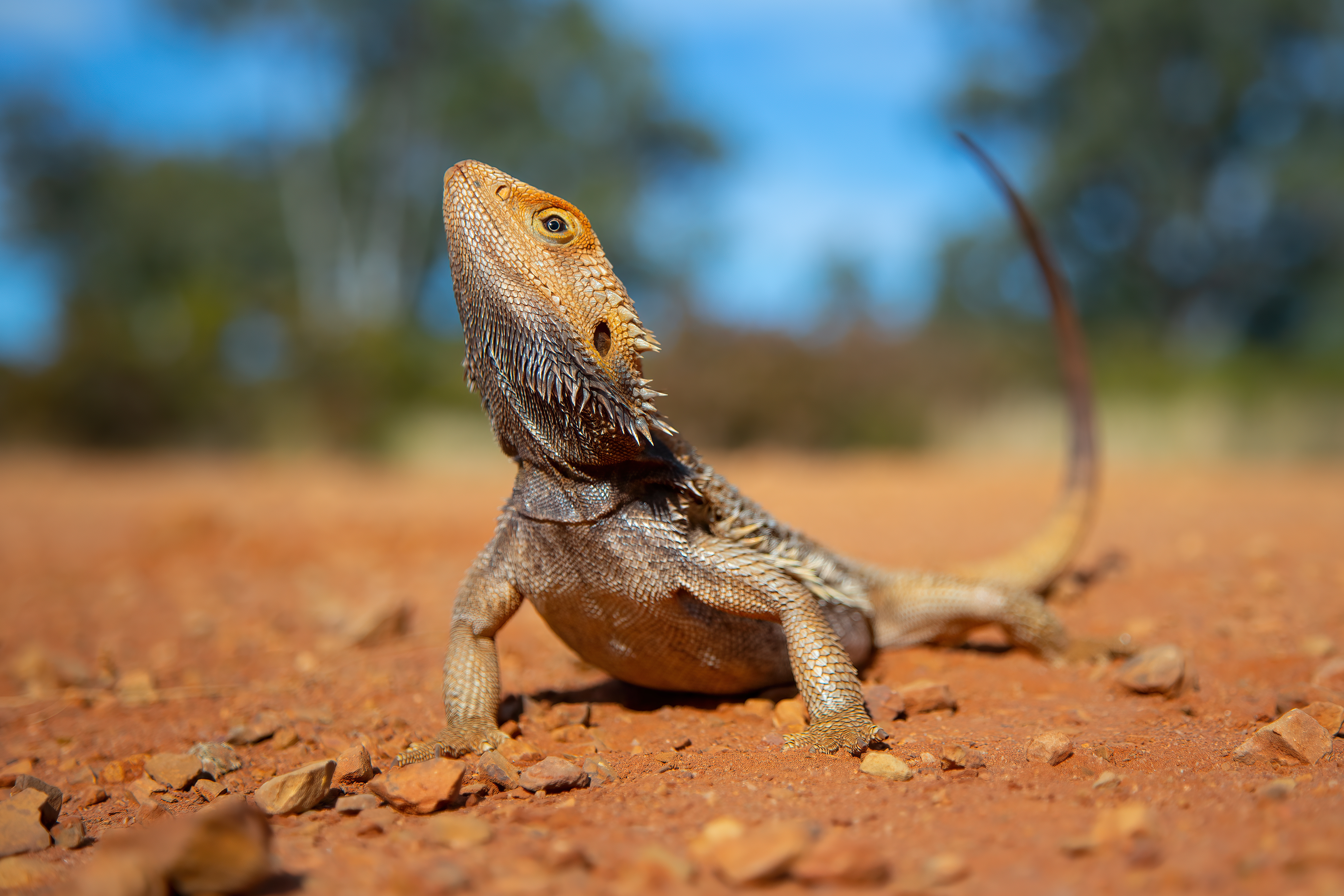
- The eastern bearded dragon, Pogona barbata

Conservation status
- Least Concern (IUCN 3.1)

Scientific classification
- Kingdom: Animalia
- Phylum: Chordata
- Class: Reptilia
- Order: Squamata
- Suborder: Iguania
- Family: Agamidae
- Genus: Pogona
- Species: P. barbata

Binomial name
- Pogona barbata (Cuvier, 1829)
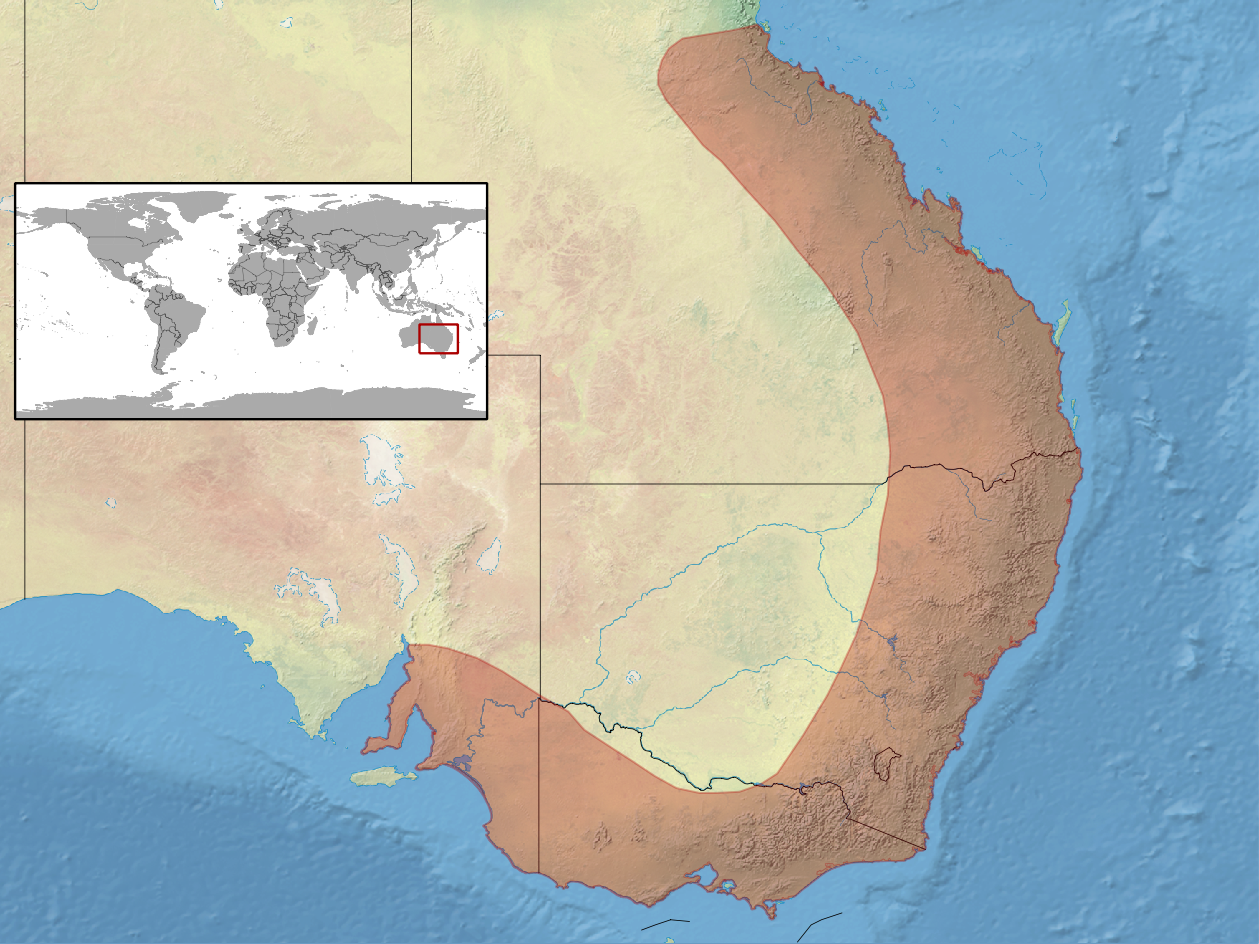

Synonyms
- Agama barbata Cuvier, 1829; Stellio discosomus Peron, 1807 (nomen oblitum); Amphibolurus barbatus (Cuvier, 1829); Grammatophora barbata (Cuvier, 1829)

= Eastern bearded dragon =

Species of lizard

The eastern bearded dragon (Pogona barbata), also known as common bearded dragon or simply bearded lizard, is an agamid lizard found in wooded parts of Australia. It is one of a group of species known commonly as bearded dragons. Other common names for this species include Jew lizard and frilly lizard, the latter being a confusion between this and another dragon, the frill-necked lizard (Chlamydosaurus kingii). This species was originally described in 1829 by Georges Cuvier, who named it Amphibolurus barbatus.

== Description ==
P. barbata is one of the eight recognized species within the genus Pogona. Adult males can grow to about 60 cm (24 in) from the snout to the tip of the tail, while females may reach 50 cm (20 in) in overall length.

The head is large and triangular in shape. The throat is covered with spiny, dark grey scales which can be raised to form an impressive "beard". Several groups of even longer spiny scales are located at the back of the head, the corners of the mouth, the external ear openings, and running posteriorly along both sides of the abdomen. The thorax and abdomen are relatively slender and flattened dorsoventrally.

It is usually grey-black or red in skin colour and is sometimes reddish-brown, yellowish-brown, or dark brown. Juveniles are paler in colour than the adults and have patterns that fade as they mature. As the animal matures, it develops a subtle pale yellow, blue, or green tinge on the forepart of its head. If excited and at higher temperatures head, flanks and legs have a yellowish to orange colour. Usually however they are rather dark, from yellowish to grey and black. The inside of the mouth is generally a bright yellow colour.

P. barbata resembles its close relative, the central bearded dragon, but may be distinguished from the latter by its less robust body and the row of spines along the lateral edge of the body, which continues over the forearm.

== Distribution and habitat ==
It is most common in eastern Australia south of Cape York Peninsula, but specimens have been collected from Cape York, through central Australia, and even from the west coast of Australia.

== Ecology and behaviour ==
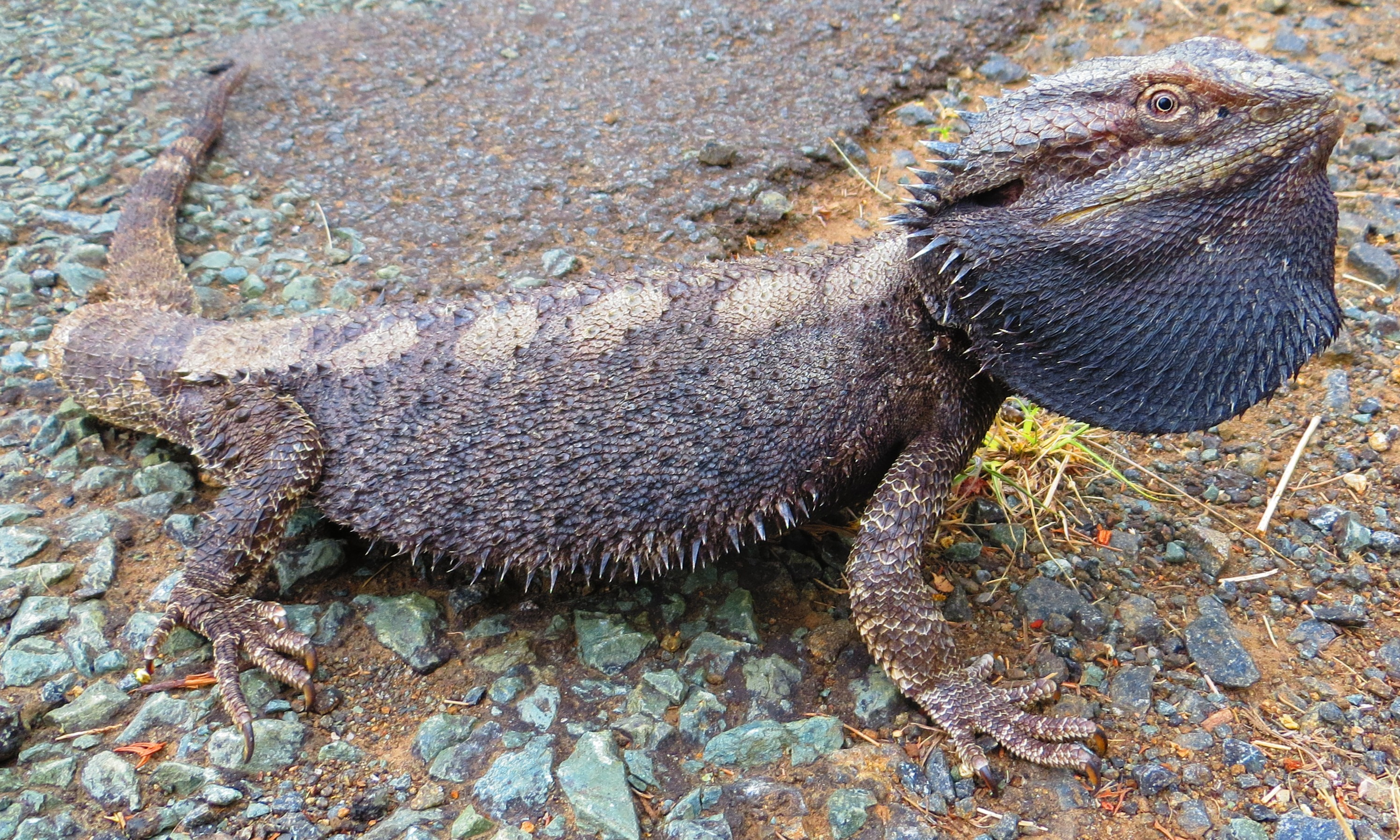
Eastern bearded dragon displaying its beard on Christmas Creek Road, Lamington, Queensland

Eastern bearded dragons are diurnal. They are arboreal and perch on exposed places such as tree branches or logs, retreating to lower and cooler places when too hot. They are more aggressive than the central bearded dragon. The males are territorial and permit only females and juveniles in their territory. Dominant males are usually the biggest dragons and get the highest perches. Females tunnel into dry earth to lay a clutch of eggs.

When threatened, it inflates its throat and displays its beard. If further provoked, it opens its mouth to display the bright yellow colour of the lining of its mouth. In its close relative, the central bearded dragon; the lining of the mouth is of a reddish-pink hue. However the eastern bearded dragon will perform this beard display more often than its cousin.

== Sex makeup ==
Recent observations concluded that hot temperatures were responsible for some of eastern bearded dragon lizards to change their sex makeup. Some lizards changed their male appearance to female, and have offspring, besides having the male ZZ chromosomes, of the genetic male lizards.

== Diet ==
The eastern bearded dragon feeds on a variety of small animals, including mice, smaller reptiles, and insects – mostly mealworms and crickets. In some wild populations, male bearded dragons are herbivores. In captivity, it also eats leaf vegetables such as clover and small flowers, fruits, and berries.

== Gallery ==
Eastern bearded dragon

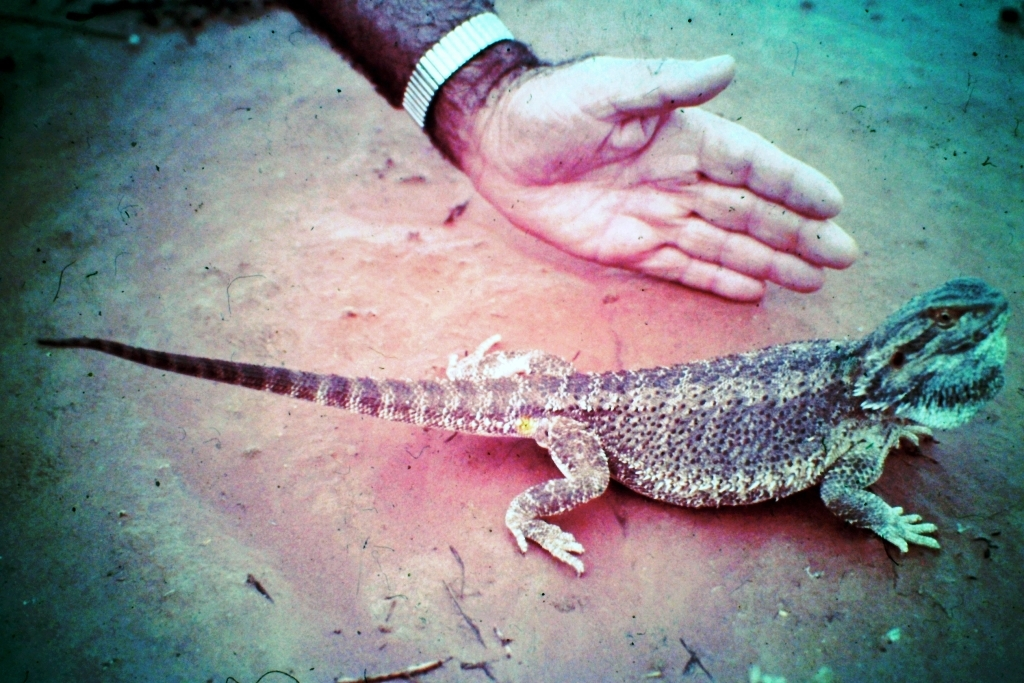
Eastern bearded dragon. Near Bourke, NSW.

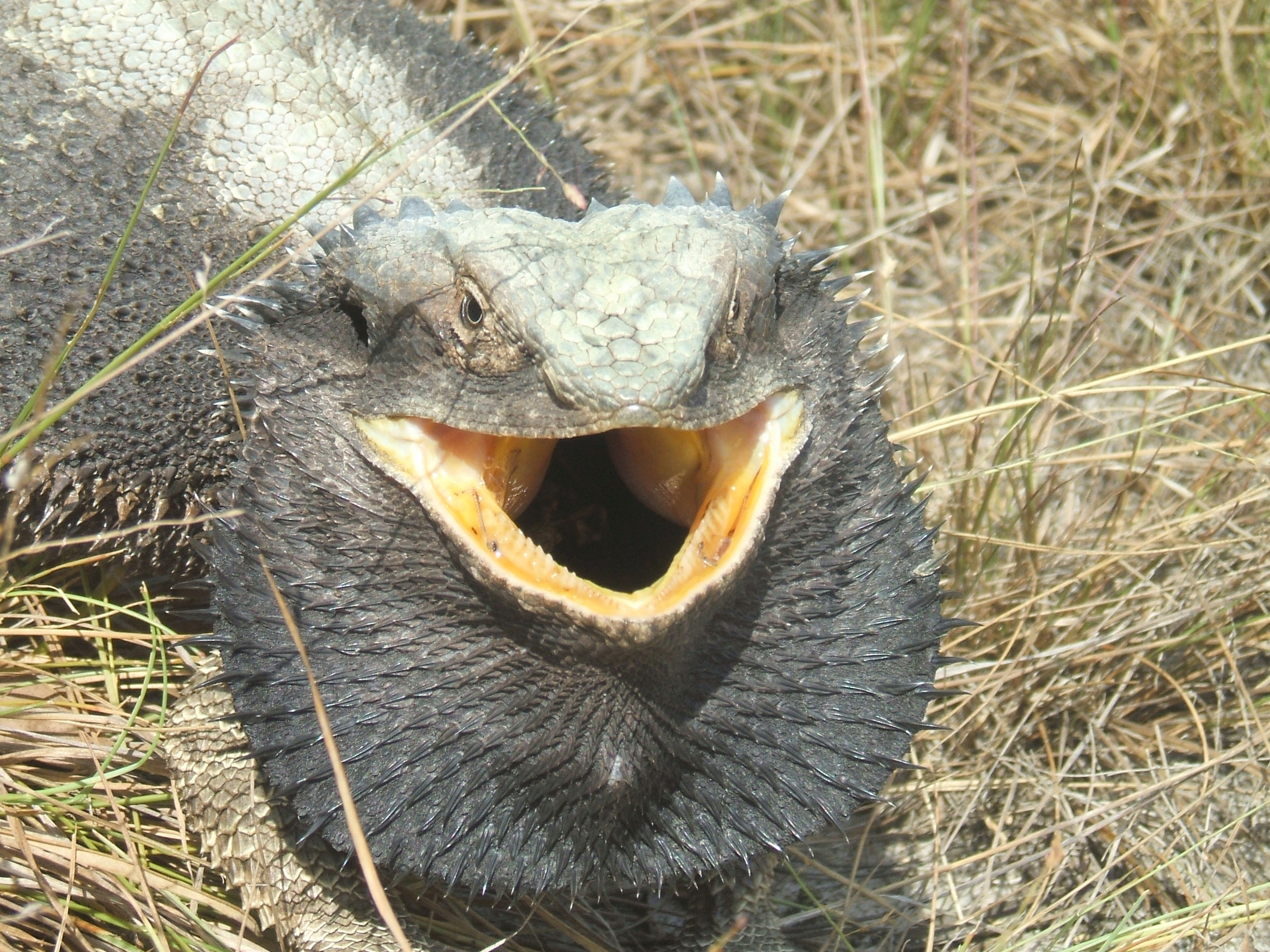
Eastern bearded dragon showing a threatening defence display

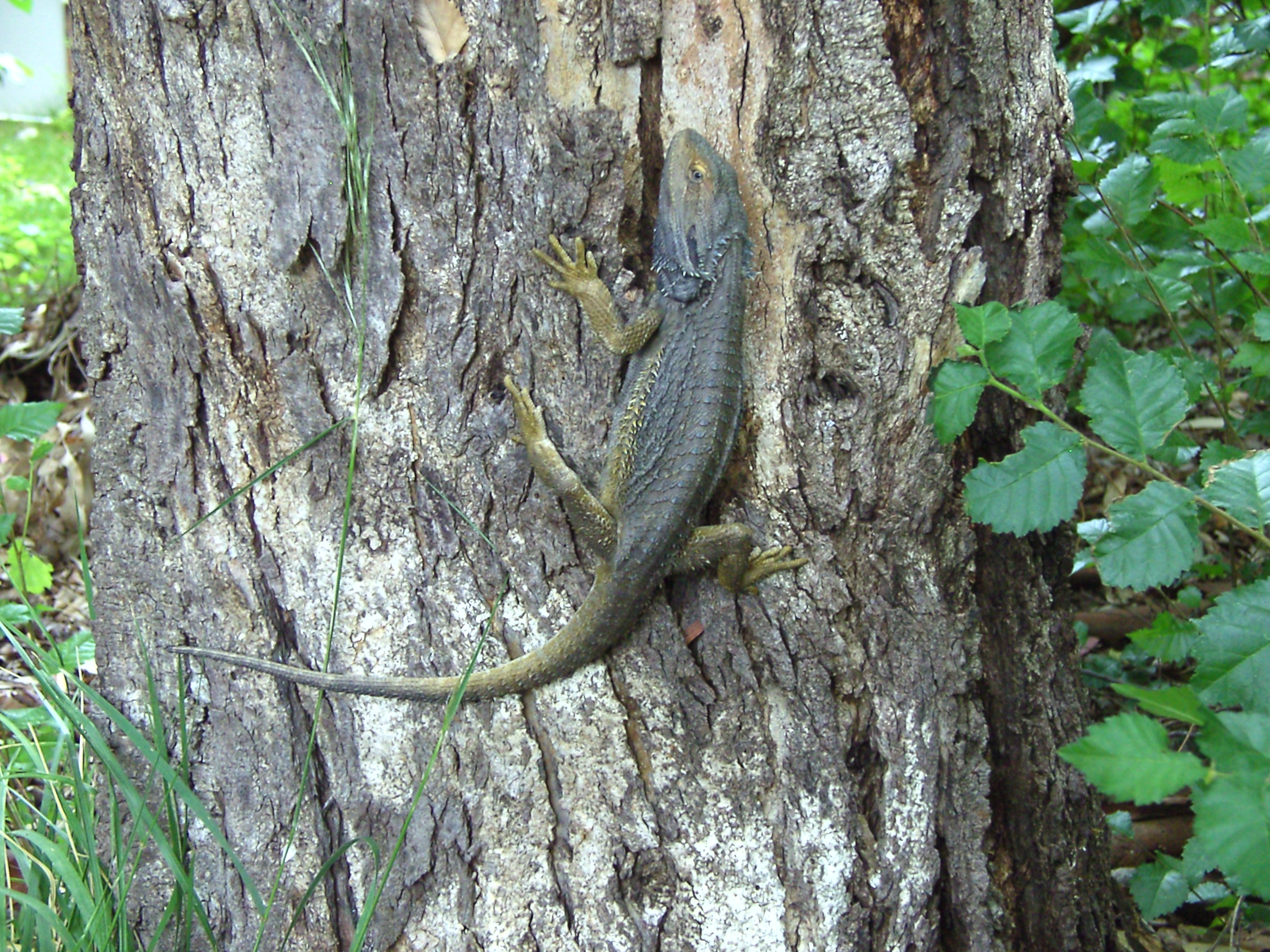
Yearling eastern bearded dragon found in a suburban yard in Canberra, Australian Capital Territory

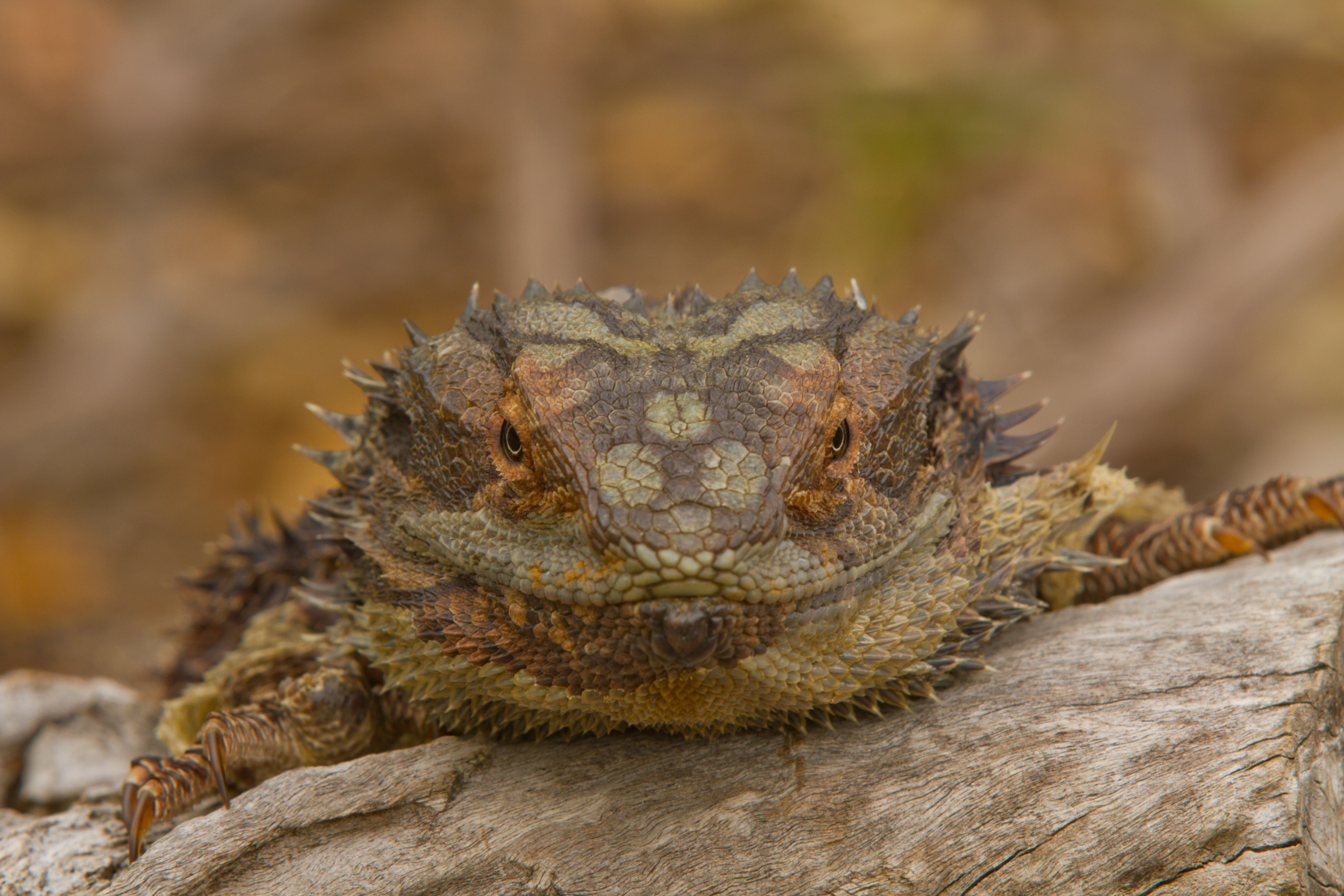
Head-on view of an Eastern Bearded Dragon. Brisbane, Australia
