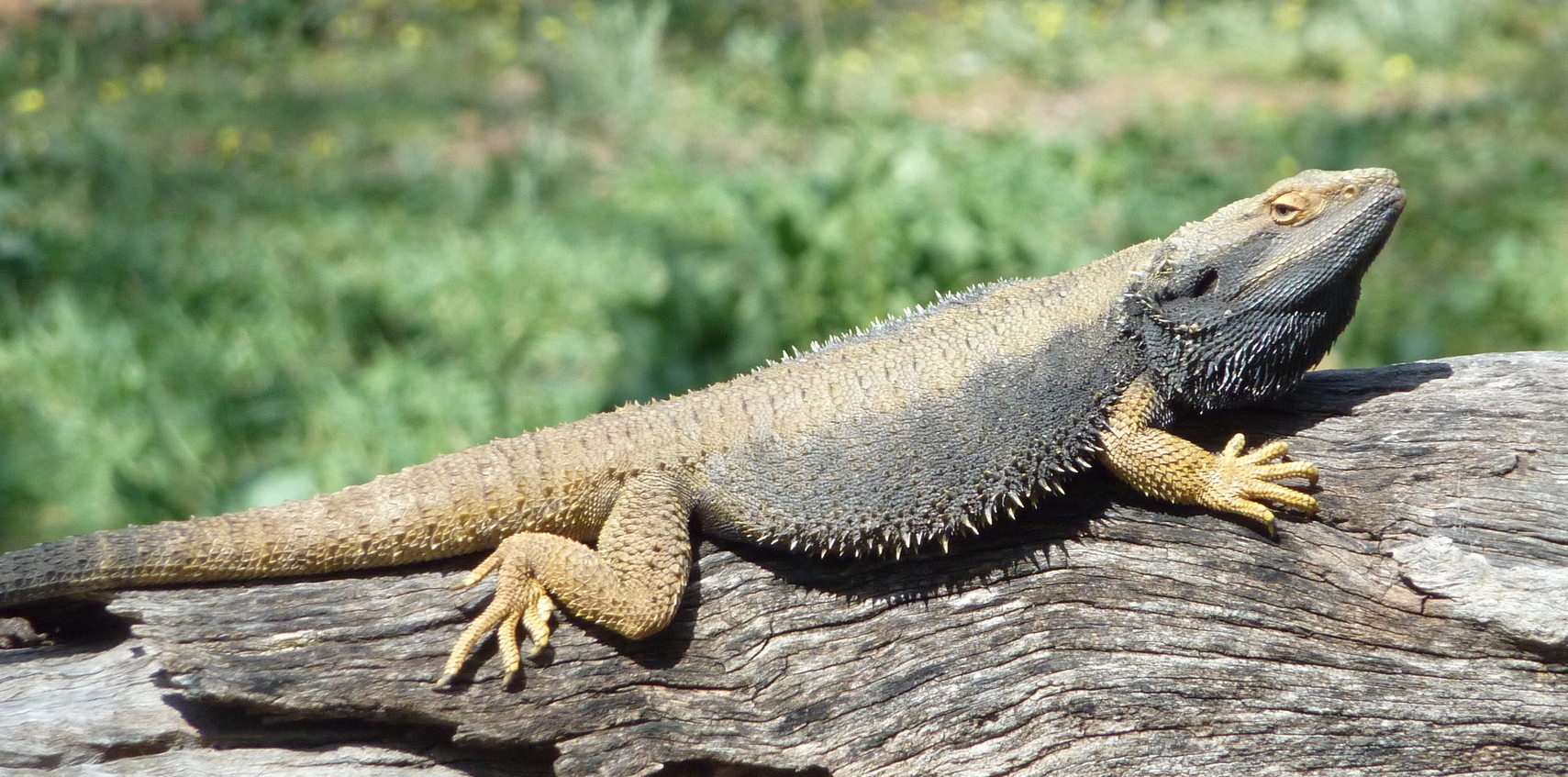
- Eastern bearded dragon (P. barbata)

Scientific classification
- Kingdom: Animalia
- Phylum: Chordata
- Class: Reptilia
- Order: Squamata
- Suborder: Iguania
- Family: Agamidae
- Subfamily: Amphibolurinae
- Genus: Pogona; Storr, 1982

Type species
- Agama barbata Cuvier 1829

Species
- Pogona barbata; Pogona henrylawsoni; Pogona microlepidota; Pogona minor; Pogona mitchelli; Pogona nullarbor; Pogona vitticeps

= Pogona =

Genus of lizards known as bearded dragons

Pogona is a genus of reptiles containing eight lizard species, which are often known by the common name bearded dragons or informally (especially in Australia) beardies. The name "bearded dragon" refers to the underside of the throat (or "beard") of the lizard, which can turn black and become inflated for a number of reasons, most often as a result of stress, if they feel threatened, or are trying to entice a mate. They are a semiarboreal species, spending significant amounts of time on branches and in bushes. Pogona species bask on rocks and exposed branches in the mornings and afternoons and sleep at night, making them a diurnal species. Their diet consists primarily of vegetation and some insects. They are found throughout much of Australia and inhabit environments such as deserts and shrublands.

== Description ==
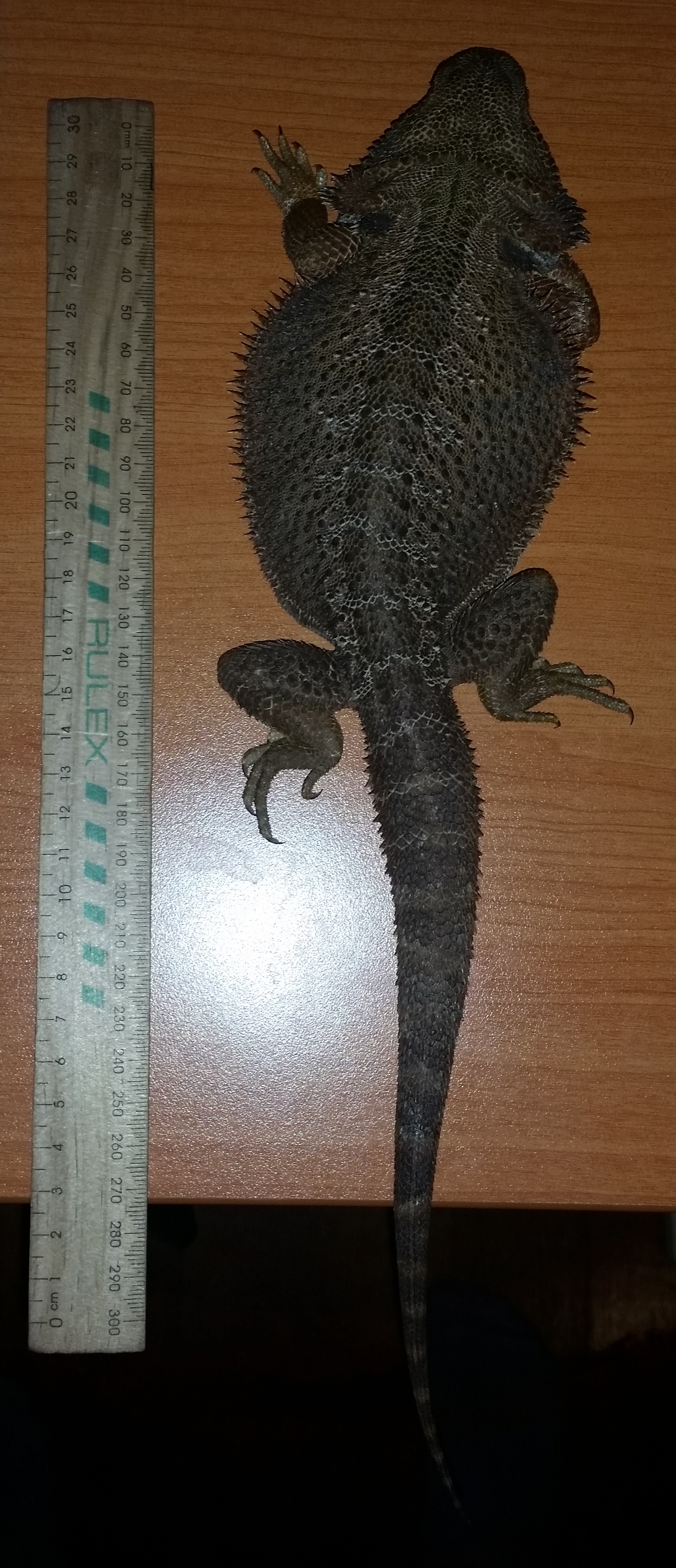
Captive adult measuring over 30 cm (1 ft)

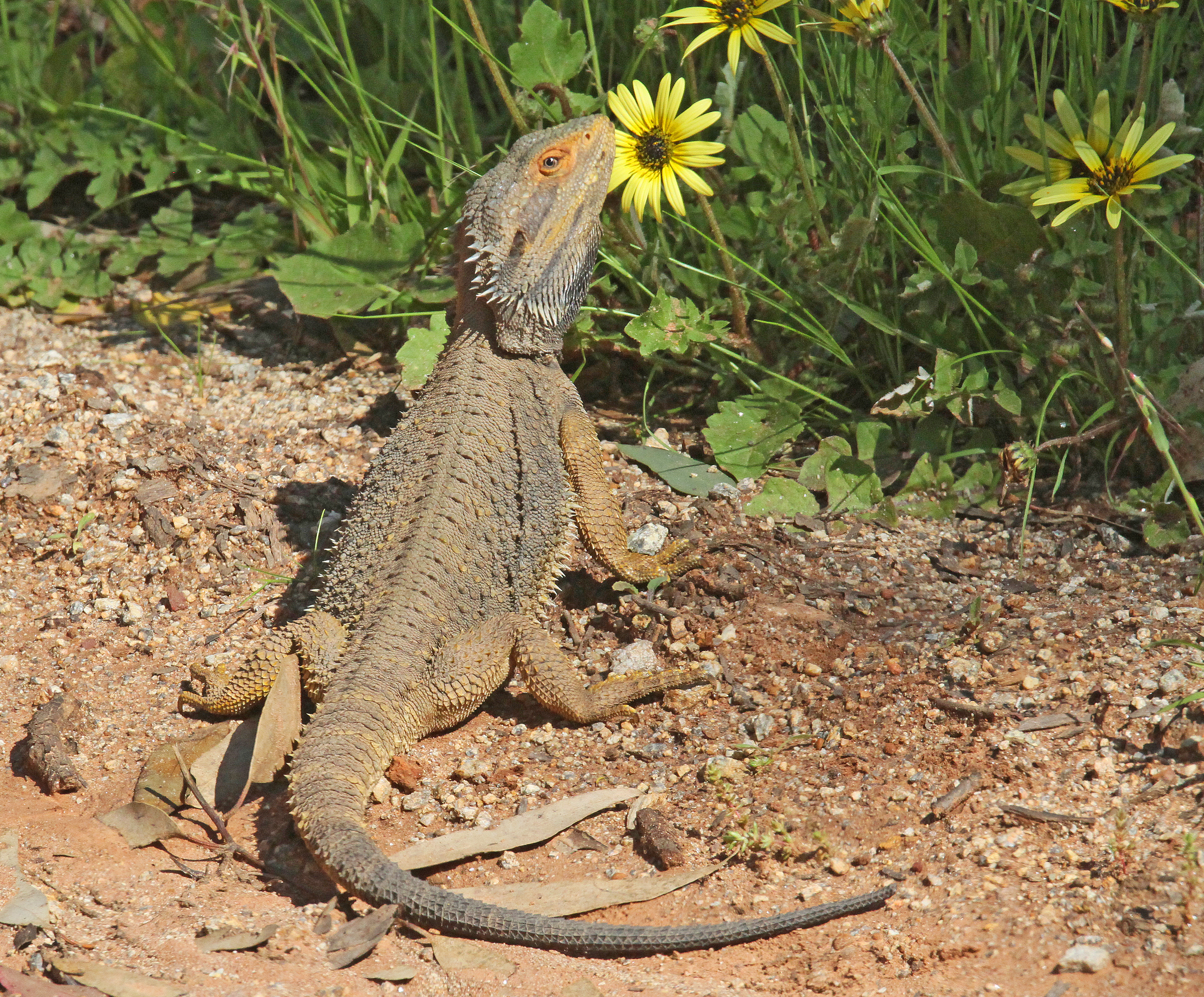
Galore Hill Nature Reserve, New South Wales, Australia

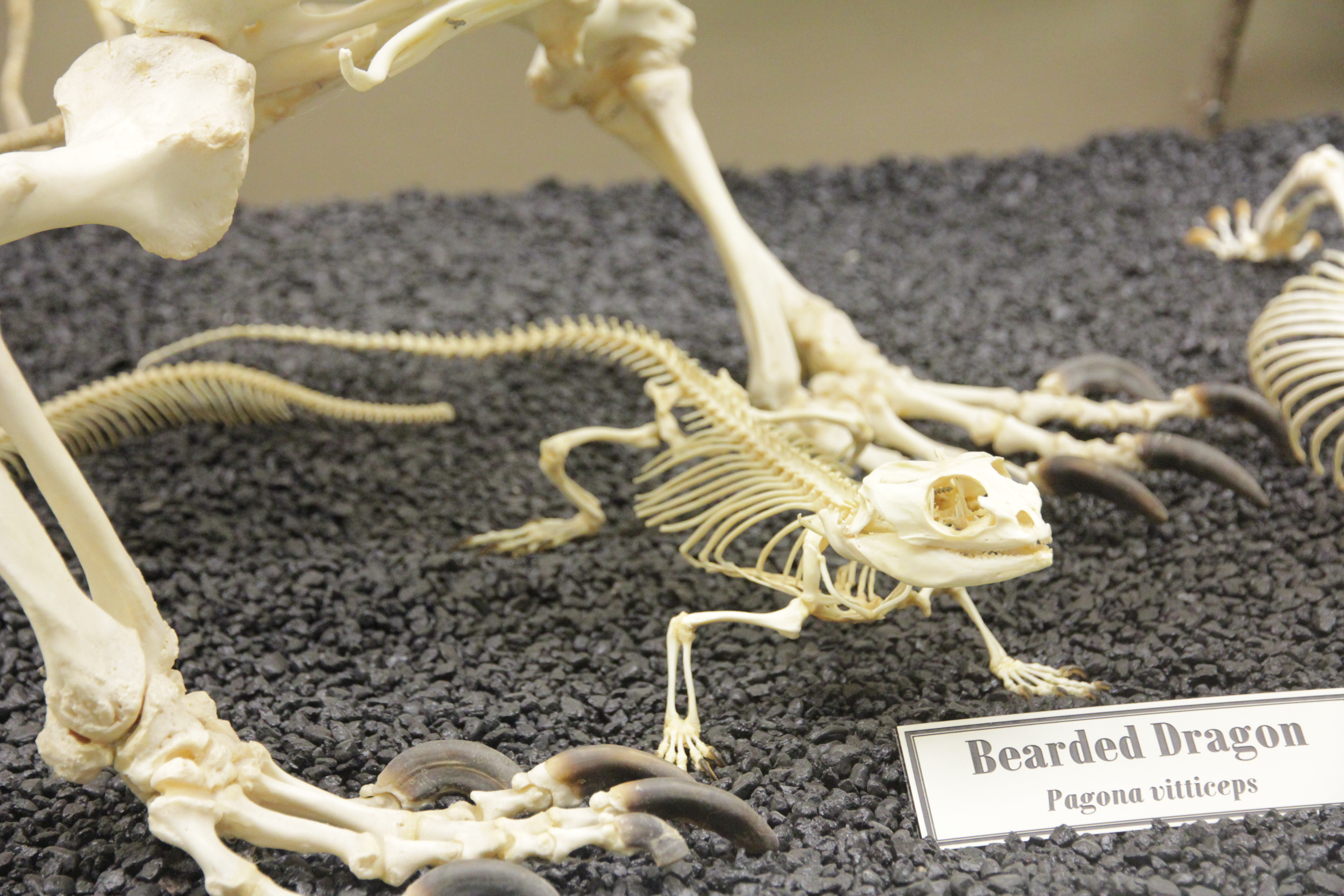
Skeleton at the Museum of Osteology in Oklahoma City, Oklahoma, United States

The genus Pogona is in the subfamily Amphibolurinae of the lizard group Agamidae. Bearded dragons are characterized by their broad, triangular heads, flattened bodies, and rows and clusters of spiny scales covering their entire bodies. When threatened, bearded dragons puff up their bodies and beards to ward off predators and make their somewhat dull spikes seem more dangerous. Bearded dragons use hand-waving and head-bobbing gestures as mating displays. Head-bobbing can also be a sign of aggression and dominance while hand-waving can be a submissive gesture. Some have the ability to slightly change color in response to certain stimuli including rivalry challenges between males and ambient temperature changes (e.g., turning black to absorb heat). Bearded dragons occur in a variety of colors including browns and blacks and morphs and can range from being all dark to completely white under controlled breeding conditions. Males grow up to 60 cm (24 in) long, and females up to 51 cm (20 in).

Bearded dragons contain a unique N-glycoslation resistance mechanism, which is absent in other Australian agamids. Due to the distinct morphology of the species, bearded dragons are more resistant to neurotoxic elapid snakes, and thus displaying selective evolution.

== Habitat ==
Bearded dragons live in the woodlands, heaths, deserts and coastal dunes, with their range extending throughout the interior of the eastern states to the eastern half of South Australia and southeastern Northern Territory. They are considered to be semiarboreal and quite readily climb and bask at height. This is also linked to dominance behavior and competition for territory/basking areas. They can be found on fallen/broken trees, rocky outcrops, and bushes when basking. Many of the Australian locals have spotted bearded dragons on fence posts and elevated rocky areas. At night, they prefer to dig holes to sleep in, climb in trees, or submerge themselves in rocks and like to climb into the cracks and crevices of stones and caves.

Bearded dragons go through a type of hibernation called brumation, in which like hibernation, reptiles go months without eating, but sporadically drink water. Reptiles go dormant in the hottest temperatures, but it differs from brumation during cooler temperatures. When temperatures are extreme, a very small range of temperatures exists through which the reptile's bodies can stay active and where their bodies cannot tolerate the extreme heat and they die. Bearded dragons go through brumation when the temperature goes below 15.5–21.0 °C (60–70 °F) during the night and 24.0–26.5 °C (75–80 °F) during the day for 8–10 hours. When the climate is too hot they will often burrow underground. They will also form more permanent burrows or covered hiding places to use as protection from the climate changes at night and predation.

== Species ==
The following six species are recognised as being valid.

| Species | Common name |
|---|---|
| Pogona barbata (Cuvier, 1829) | Eastern bearded dragon |
| Pogona henrylawsoni (Wells & Wellington, 1985) | Rankin's dragon, Lawson's dragon, black-soil bearded dragon, dumpy dragon, dwarf bearded dragon |
| Pogona microlepidota (Glauert, 1952) | Kimberley bearded dragon, Drysdale River bearded dragon |
| Pogona minor (Sternfeld, 1919) | Western bearded dragon, Dwarf bearded dragon |
| Pogona nullarbor (Badham, 1976) | Nullarbor bearded dragon |
| Pogona vitticeps (Ahl, 1926) | Central bearded dragon, Inland bearded dragon |

Nota bene: A binomial authority in parentheses indicates that the species was originally described under a different binomial.

== Behavior ==
Adult bearded dragons are very territorial. As they grow, they establish territories in which displays of aggression and appeasement form a normal part of their social interactions. A dominant male adopts a dominant stance and sometimes readies himself for a fight to attack a male aggressor to defend territory or food sources, or in competition for a female. Any male approaching without displaying submissive behavior is seen as a challenge for territory. Aggressive males have even been known to attack females that do not display submissive gestures in return.

Correspondingly, adult male bearded dragons can bite more forcefully than adult females, which is associated with greater head dimensions.

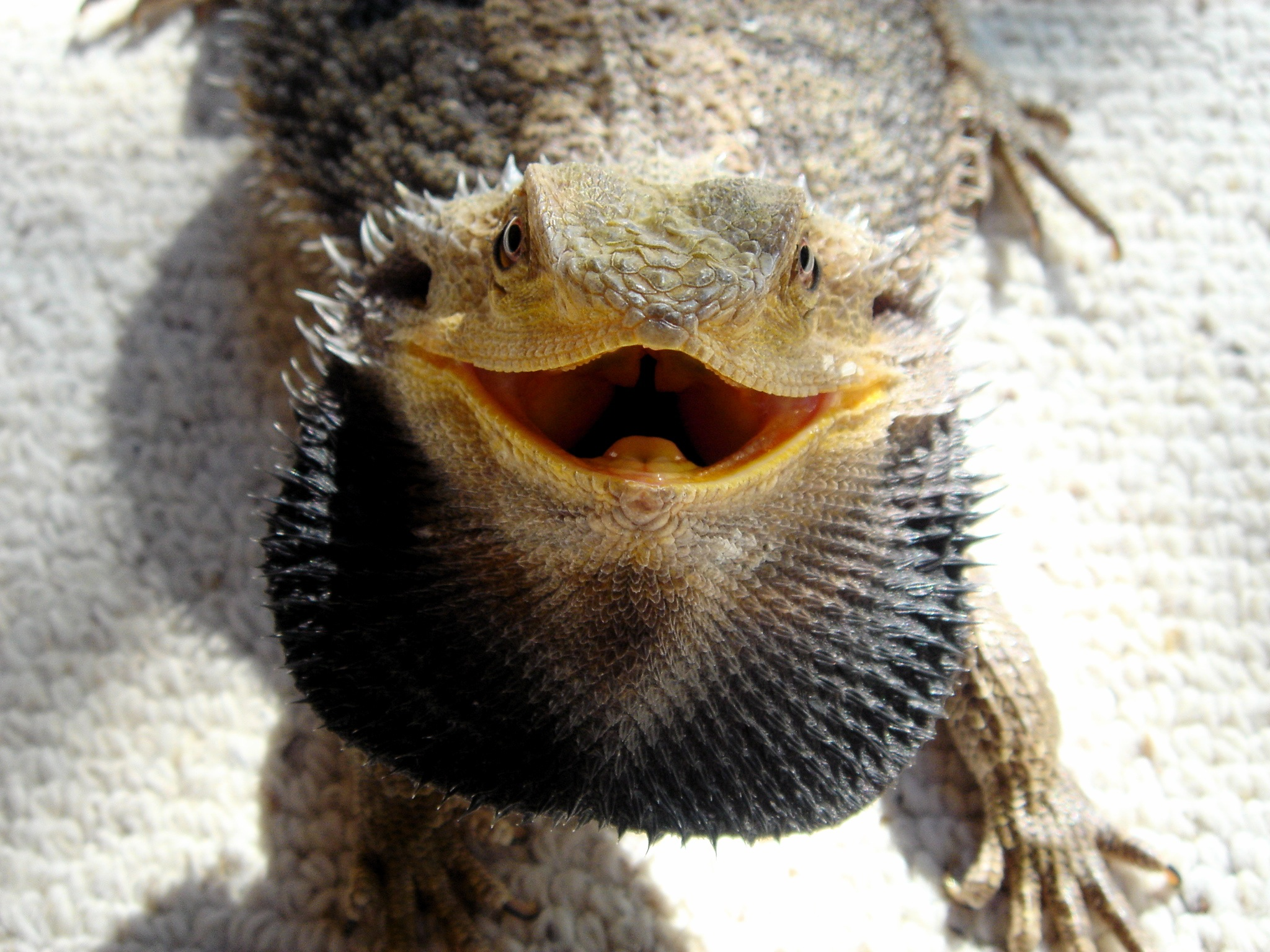
Bearded dragon with mouth agape

The bearded dragon occurs in many different colors. The beard itself is used for mating and aggression displays, as well as heat management. It forms part of a range of gestures and signals through which the dragons have basic levels of communication. Both sexes have a beard, but males display more frequently, especially in courtship rituals. Females also display their beards as a sign of aggression. The beard darkens, sometimes turning jet black, and inflates during the display. The bearded dragon may also open its mouth and gape in addition to inflating its beard to appear more intimidating. Extreme behavior such as hissing can be observed when threatened with a predator, inflating the body and tilting towards the threat in defense. Bearded dragons have relatively strong jaws, but often only attack as a last resort when threatened outside of competition with their own species.

Head bobbing is another behavior seen in both females and males; they quickly move their heads up and down, often darkening and flaring their beards. Changes in the pace of head bobbing are thought to be a form of communication. Males head bob to impress females, and a male often has to demonstrate his dominance when attempting to mate before the female will concede. Smaller males often respond to a larger male's head bobbing by arm waving, which is a submissive sign. Females also arm wave to avoid aggression, often in response to a male's head bobbing. Female bearded dragons have been seen lowering themselves towards the ground and intermittently arm waving whilst moving away from a dominant male in an attempt to either appease or escape.

The bearded dragon has also been shown to perceive illusion, specifically the Delboeuf illusion. In an experiment at the University of Padova, bearded dragons were presented with two different-sized plates with the same amount of food. The bearded dragons chose the smaller plate more often than they chose the larger one, showing that they were able to perceive the illusion and interpret that a larger plate does not always mean more food. This is the first evidence of this behavior being shown in a reptile species.

== Reproduction ==
When brumation comes to an end, the male bearded dragon goes out to find a mate. A courtship ritual occurs where the male starts bobbing his head, waving his arms, and stomping his feet in front of the female. The male chases the female and bites the back of her neck and holds on while he gets in position to copulate.

During the breeding period, female bearded dragons can store sperm in their oviductal crypts. This allows the females to lay a clutch of 11–30 eggs, twice from one mating.

Bearded dragons exhibit temperature sex determination; while the embryo is developing, higher temperatures cause dragons with a male genotype to experience sex reversal and express a female phenotype. This produces a bearded dragon that is a female, but still has a male genotype. Incubation temperatures above 31 °C (88 °F) can cause sex reversal, and the likelihood of sex reversal has a positive correlation with temperature up to 36 °C. Incubation temperatures below 31 °C cannot trigger sex reversal. Surprisingly, female bearded dragons with a male genotype do not have many differences from genotypic females. According to one study done on bite force, male bearded dragons have a higher bite force than genotypic females, and sex-reversed females, but no difference was seen between genotypic females and sex-reversed females.

Like many other reptile species (and what is most often observed in birds), females are capable of laying eggs even without fertilization. These eggs appear slightly smaller and softer, and contain a yellow yolk when broken open.

=== Congenital defects ===
During the development of an embryo, abnormalities may result in birth defects. These abnormalities might be caused by chromosomal disorders, chemicals, or other genetic or environmental factors.

- Bicephalism is when a bearded dragon is born with two heads and one body.
- Anasarca is when a bearded dragon is swollen within the egg. Observing eggs in the incubator, an anasarca egg appears to be sweating. The cause of this is not known.
- Shistosomus reflexa is when the organs of a bearded dragon develop outside of the body.
- Spinal and limb defects are abnormalities in the spine, tail, limbs, or toes. This occurs with nutritional deficiencies, trauma, or temperature issues during the development of the affected area.
- Microphthalmia/anophthalmia is when a bearded dragon is born with small or no eye(s). The cause of this defect is a traumatic event or an environmental event that occurred during the development of the eyes.
- Hermaphroditism is when the reproductive organs of both male and female are present. Bearded dragons born with both reproductive organs are infertile.
- Tail Necrosis/Tail rot is a serious condition in which the bearded dragon's tail starts to rot and blacken. It is caused by tail injury, blood clot, or shedding complications, and can kill the bearded dragon.

== In captivity ==
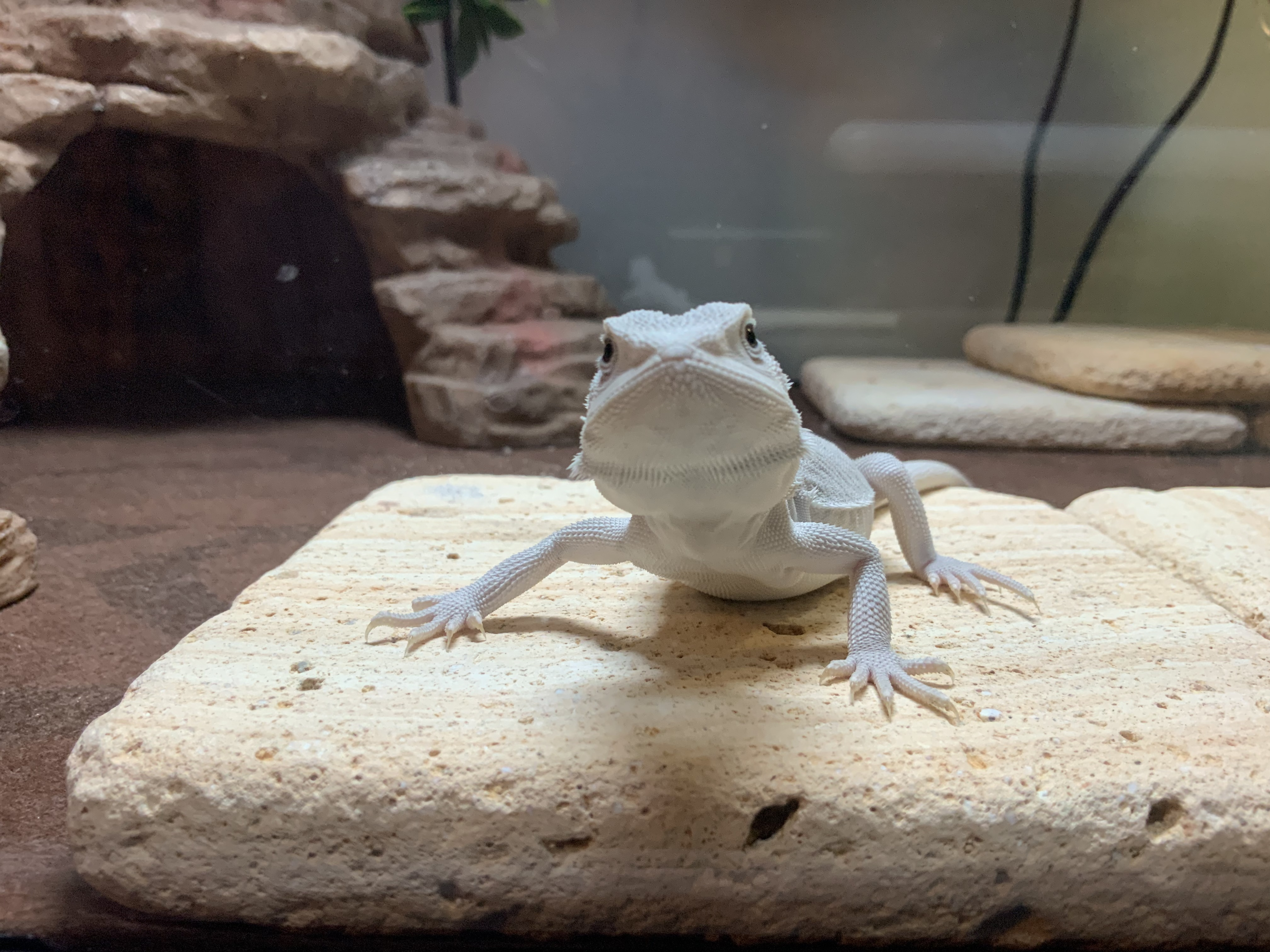
Through selective breeding, bearded dragons can have various colors and patterns.

The central bearded dragon is the most common species in captivity, as well as one of the most popular pet reptiles, with some smaller species such as Pogona henrylawsoni being used as substitutes where less housing space is available. Introduced into the U.S. as pets during the 1990s, bearded dragons have gained much popularity as an exotic pet. This popularity has been sustained, even after Australia banned the sale of its wildlife as pets in the 1960s.

Generally, the bearded dragon is a solitary animal. Males are usually housed alone, as they fight with other males and breed with females. Captive adults reach about 40 to 61 cm (16 to 24 in) from head to tail, weigh 290 to 600 g (10 to 20 oz) and live for about 10 to 15 years and longer with good care. They have been known to live up to about 15 years in captivity, and the current world record is 18 years.

Through selective breeding, many different versions of the central bearded dragon have been developed, referred to as "morphs". They have a few main genetic traits, including "hypomelanism" and "translucent", which refer to traits physically displayed by the dragon. Bearded dragons with hypomelanism often tend to have lighter and more vibrant coloration. Translucents have a less opaque quality to their skin, making their colors seem stronger, and have black eyes. Also, "leatherbacks" have reduced scale texture to give a smoother skin, "silkbacks" have softer outer skin, and "German giants" are larger than average. Silkbacks in particular require special care, as they have far more delicate skin, and as such, require different UV and humidity requirements. They also tend to live shorter lives.

=== Common health issues ===
Although bearded dragons are fairly resilient to illness, improper care can potentially kill a bearded dragon. Some health issues that bearded dragons may have include metabolic bone disease, adenovirus, impaction, polarisation, dystocia, Yellow Fungus Disease and parasites. The majority of health issues bearded dragons face in captivity are due to poor diet and inadequate heat and lighting.

==== Metabolic bone disease ====
Metabolic bone disease (MBD) is a collective term for several common diseases/illnesses that can be fatal and is probably the most common health problem of bearded dragons. A main attribute of MBD is the weakening of the skeletal structure and possible deformation. It occurs in bearded dragons due to malnutrition or the use of improper lighting, meaning they are unable to properly assimilate calcium from their diet or there isn't enough in their diet. Most bearded dragons in captivity will be fed supplementation and all will need a UVB light to enable them to properly use calcium in their diet. Typical foods that bearded dragons eat, including kale, mustard greens, and collard greens, are high in calcium and should be eaten daily along with other leafy greens and vegetables to have a well-balanced diet. Bearded dragons require UVB lights to process calcium in their diet. Without processing this calcium, their bodies will use calcium from their bones, therefore weakening them. Symptoms seen in bearded dragons with MBD include bumps in the legs, twitches or tremors, bumps along the spine or tail, a swollen bottom jaw, and jerky movements.

==== Hypocalcemia ====
Hypocalcemia occurs when there are low levels of calcium in the bearded dragon's blood. Hypocalcemia is most often tied to metabolic bone disease. Low levels of calcium can result in twitching muscles, or seizures. Hypocalcemia is most often seen in young bearded dragons, as they are slightly more fragile than adults. Maintaining a diet that consists of enough calcium is crucial to avoiding hypocalcemia as well as metabolic bone disease.

==== Impaction ====
Impaction occurs often in bearded dragons when they are fed food that is too big for them. Bearded dragons will try to eat worms or crickets that are too big for them, but this can be extremely harmful. Food should not be bigger than the space between their eyes for a young dragon. Older dragons can generally cope with larger insects but not oversized prey. If a dragon eats food that is too big for it, pressure will be put on its spinal cord during digestion. This pressure can lead to impaction which can lead to death.

==== Upper respiratory infection (URI) ====
In bearded dragons, respiratory infection (RI) is caused by a bacterial infection in the lungs. Bearded dragons develop a respiratory infection due to a number of reasons such as incorrect lighting and temperature, high humidity, prolonged psychological stress, and poor captive conditions.

==== Atadenovirus ====
Atadenovirus (ADV), also referred to as adenovirus, can be deadly. ADV can be spread between reptiles through contact alone. Most juvenile ADV-positive bearded dragons do not live past 90 days. While ADV-positive adults will live longer, they eventually contract liver diseases. Common symptoms of ADV-positive bearded dragons include stunted growth and slow weight gain. Because of their compromised immune systems, ADV-positive bearded dragons may be infected with intestinal parasites.

=== Lighting ===
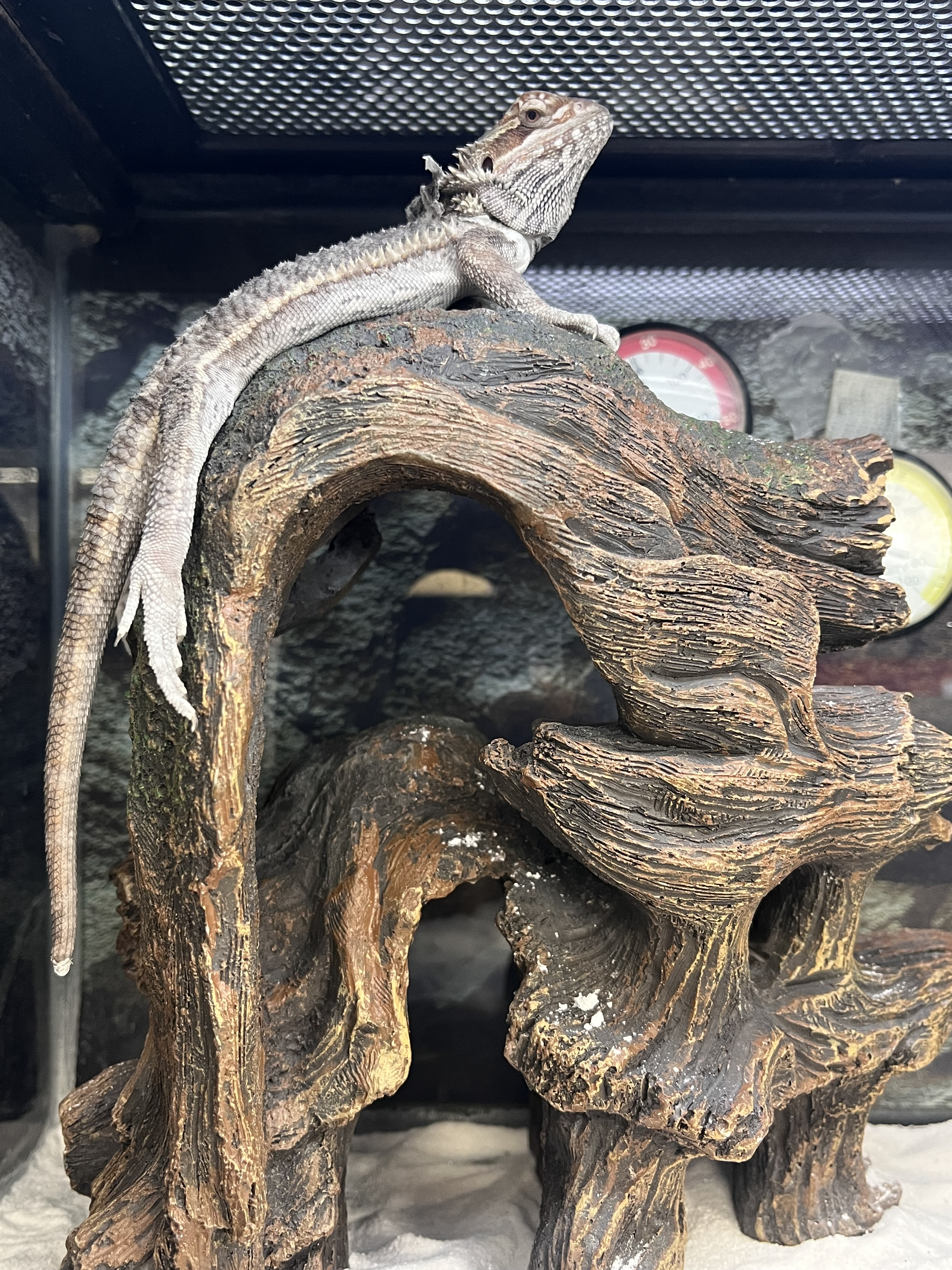
A bearded dragon in a pet store, with artificial lighting above

Bearded dragons require UVB to enable vitamin D_{3} synthesis and to prevent illnesses like metabolic bone disease. Vitamin D_{3} is essential to calcium absorption, with calcium playing a major role in various critical biological functions. Bearded dragons also require UVA, which stimulates feeding, breeding, basking and overall health. They also require a basking heat source, most commonly a light-emitting source, to provide a basking area. Heat and UV are both vital to the bearded dragons' biological function.

== Gallery ==
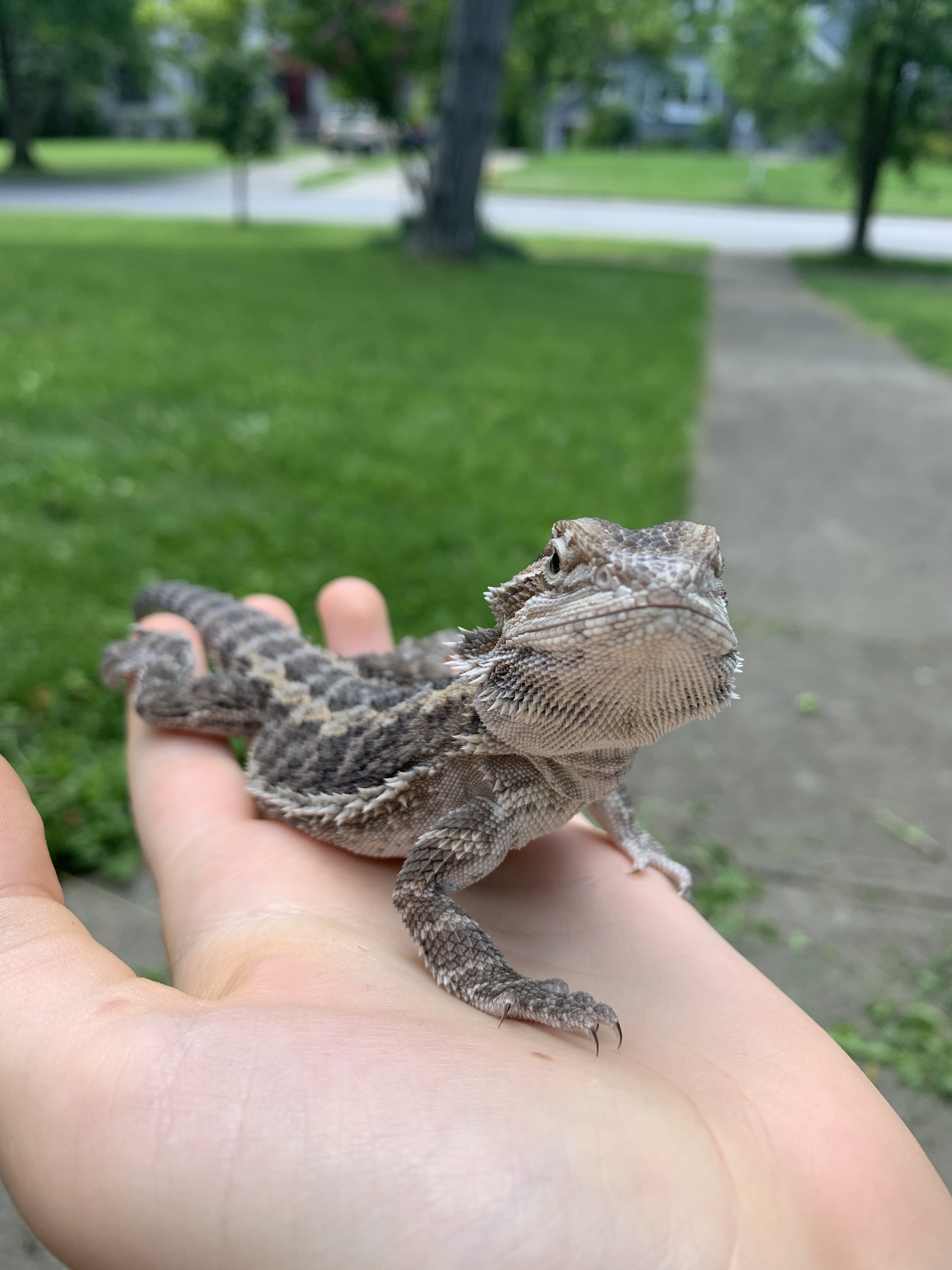
3-month-old bearded dragon

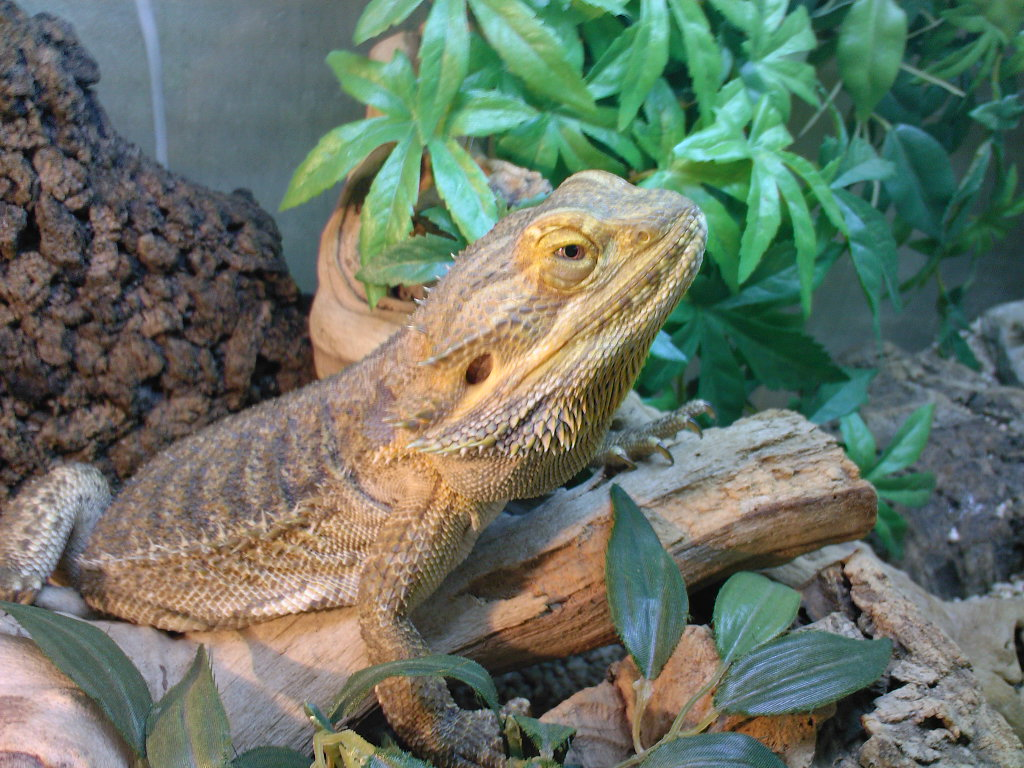
Male basking under a lamp

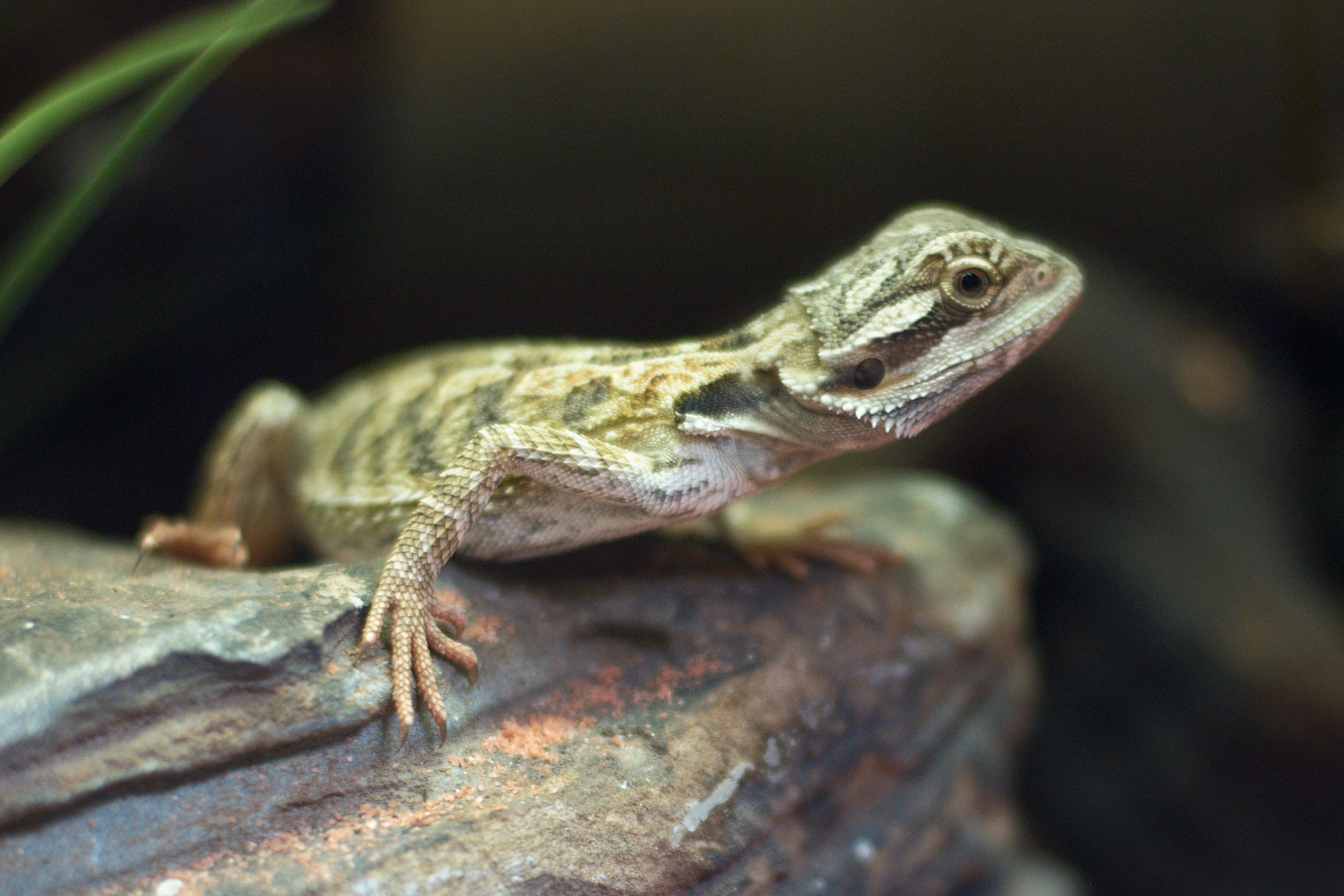
Pogona juvenile

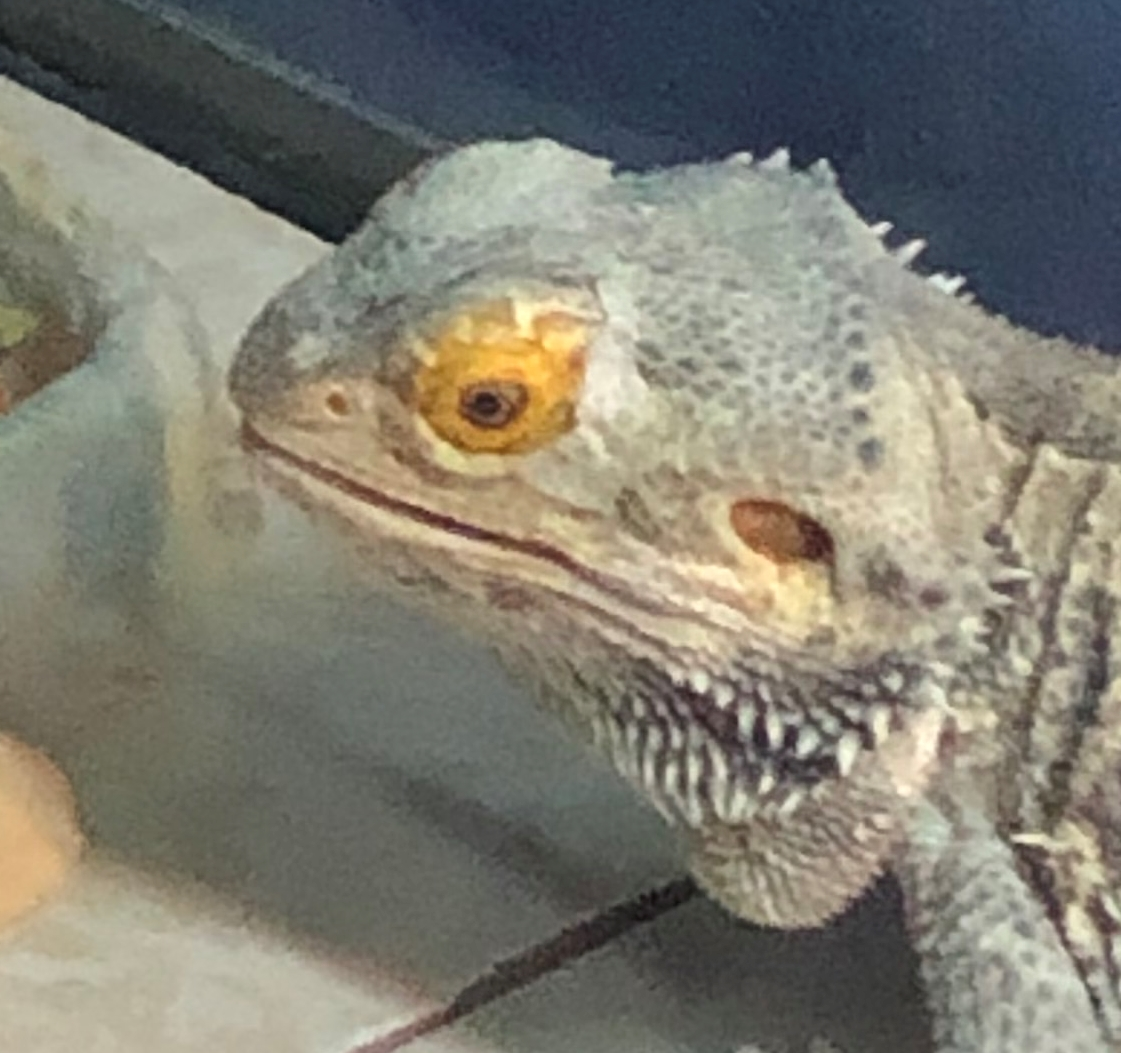
A male bearded dragon

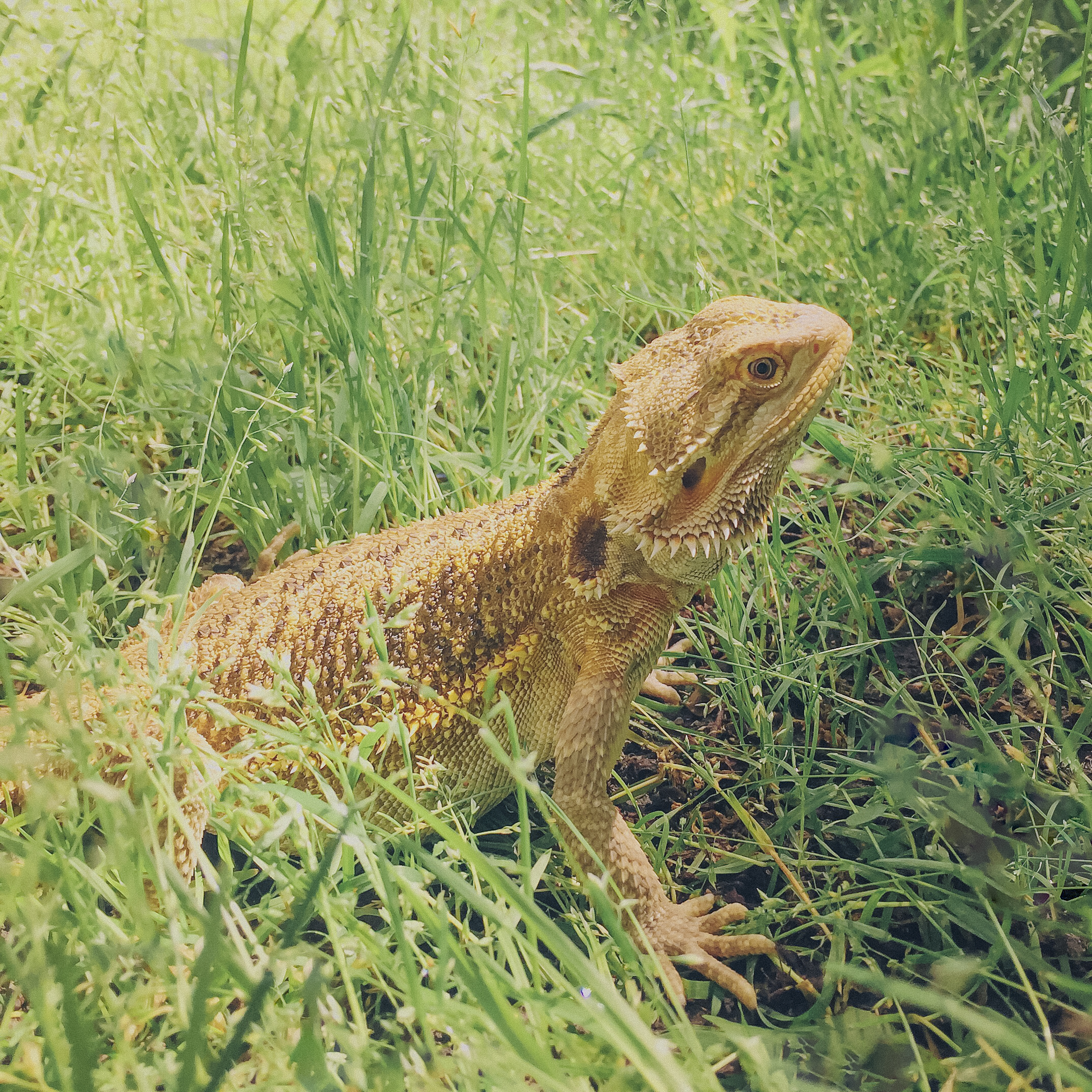

== See also ==
- Chlamydosaurus
- Leopard gecko
