= Pogona nullarbor =

Conservation status
- Least Concern (IUCN 3.1)

Scientific classification
- Kingdom: Animalia
- Phylum: Chordata
- Class: Reptilia
- Order: Squamata
- Suborder: Iguania
- Family: Agamidae
- Genus: Pogona
- Species: P. nullarbor

Binomial name
- Pogona nullarbor (Badham, 1976)

Species of lizard

Pogona nullarbor, the Nullarbor bearded dragon, is a species of agama found in Australia. The species is restricted to the Nullarbor Plain.
