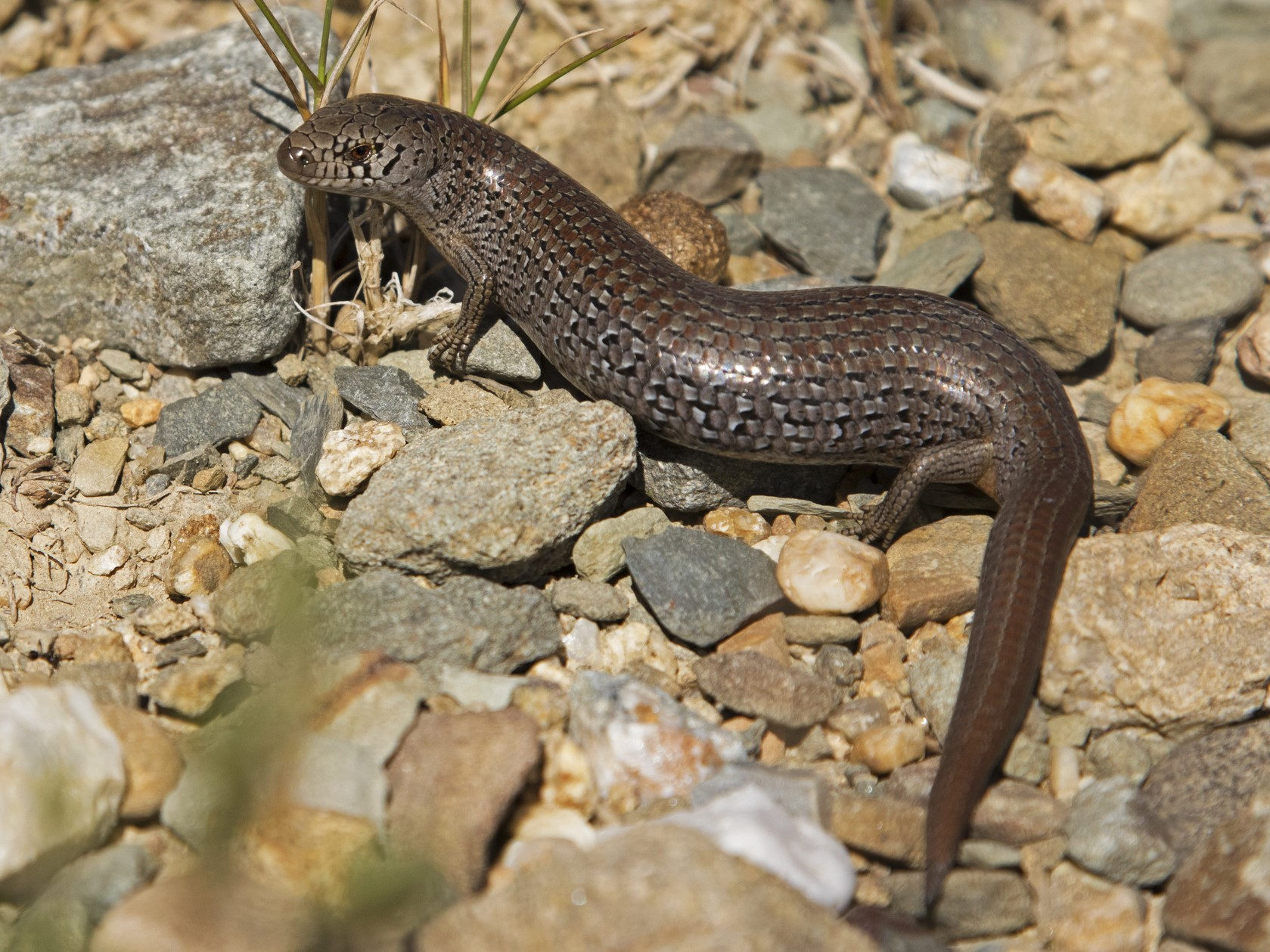
- Cyclodomorphus praealtus

Scientific classification
- Kingdom: Animalia
- Phylum: Chordata
- Class: Reptilia
- Order: Squamata
- Family: Scincidae
- Subfamily: Egerniinae

= Egerniinae =

Subfamily of skinks

Egerniinae is a subfamily of lizards, commonly called social skinks, within the family Scincidae. The genera in this subfamily were previously considered to belong to the Egernia group in the large subfamily Lygosominae.

== Genera ==
The subfamily Egerniinae contains 63 species in 8 genera.

Image	Genus	Species
	Bellatorias; Wells & Wellington, 1984	Bellatorias frerei (Günther, 1897); Bellatorias major (Gray, 1845) – Land mullet; Bellatorias obiri (Wells & Wellington, 1985)
	Corucia; Gray, 1855	Corucia zebrata Gray, 1855
	Cyclodomorphus; Fitzinger, 1843	Cyclodomorphus branchialis (Günther, 1867); Cyclodomorphus casuarinae (A.M.C. Duméril & Bibron, 1839); Cyclodomorphus celatus Shea & Miller, 1995; Cyclodomorphus gerrardii (Gray, 1845); Cyclodomorphus maximus (Storr, 1976); Cyclodomorphus melanops (Stirling & Zietz, 1893); Cyclodomorphus michaeli Wells & Wellington, 1984; Cyclodomorphus praealtus Shea, 1995; Cyclodomorphus venustus Shea & Miller, 1995
	Egernia; Gray, 1832	Egernia cunninghami (Gray, 1832) – Cunningham's spiny-tailed skink; Egernia cygnitos Doughty, Kealley & Donnellan, 2011 – Western Pilbara spiny-tailed skink; Egernia depressa (Günther, 1875) – pygmy spiny-tailed skink; Egernia douglasi Glauert, 1956 – Kimberley crevice-skink; Egernia eos Doughty, Kealley & Donnellan, 2011 – central pygmy spiny-tailed skink; Egernia epsisolus Doughty, Kealley & Donnellan, 2011 – Eastern Pilbara spiny-tailed skink; Egernia formosa Fry, 1914 – Goldfield's crevice-skink; Egernia hosmeri Kinghorn, 1955 – Hosmer's spiny-tailed skink; Egernia kingii (Gray, 1838) – King's skink; Egernia mcpheei Wells & Wellington, 1984 – eastern crevice-skink, McPhee's egernia; Egernia napoleonis (Gray, 1838) – southwestern crevice-skink; Egernia pilbarensis Storr, 1978 – Pilbara crevice-skink; Egernia richardi (W. Peters, 1869) – bright crevice-skink, dark spiny-tailed skink; Egernia roomi (Wells & Wellington, 1985); Egernia rugosa De Vis, 1888 – Yakka skink; Egernia saxatilis Cogger, 1960 – Black rock skink, black crevice-skink; Egernia stokesii (Gray, 1845) – gidgee spiny-tailed skink, gidgee skink, Stokes's skink; Egernia striolata (W. Peters, 1870) – tree crevice-skink, "tree skink"
	Liopholis; Fitzinger, 1843	Liopholis guthega Donnellan, Hutchinson, Dempsey & Osborne, 2002 – Snowy Mountains skink, guthega skink, alpine egernia; Liopholis inornata (Rosén, 1905) – desert egernia, unadorned desert-skink, "desert skink"; Liopholis kintorei (Stirling & Zietz, 1893) – Great Desert skink; Liopholis margaretae (Storr, 1968) – Centralian Ranges rock-skink, Flinder's Ranges rock-skink; Liopholis modesta (Storr, 1968) – Eastern Ranges rock-skink; Liopholis montana Donnellan, Hutchinson, Dempsey & Osborne, 2002 – montane rock-skink, mountain egernia, "mountain skink"; Liopholis multiscutata (Mitchell & Behrndt, 1949) – bull skink, southern sand-skink, heath skink; Liopholis personata (Storr, 1968); Liopholis pulchra (F. Werner, 1910) – southwestern rock-skink, spectacled rock skink, Jurien Bay rock-skink; Liopholis slateri (Storr, 1968) – Slater's desert skink, Centralian Floodplains desert-skink, Slater's egernia, Slater's skink; Liopholis striata (Sternfeld, 1919) – night skink, nocturnal desert-skink, striated egernia; Liopholis whitii (Lacépède, 1804) – White's skink, White's rock-skink
	Lissolepis; W. Peters, 1872	Lissolepis coventryi (Storr, 1978); Lissolepis luctuosa (W. Peters, 1866)
	Tiliqua; Gray, 1825	Tiliqua adelaidensis (W. Peters, 1863); Tiliqua gigas (Schneider, 1801); Tiliqua multifasciata Sternfeld, 1919; Tiliqua nigrolutea (Quoy & Gaimard, 1824); Tiliqua occipitalis (W. Peters, 1863); Tiliqua rugosa (Gray, 1825); Tiliqua scincoides (White, 1790); Irian Jaya blue tongue skink
	Tribolonotus; A.M.C. Duméril & Bibron, 1839	Tribolonotus annectens Zweifel, 1966 – Zweifel's helmet skink, New Britain spiny skink; Tribolonotus blanchardi Burt, 1930 – Blanchard's helmet skink; Tribolonotus brongersmai Cogger, 1973 – Admiralty spiny skink, Brongersma's helmet skink; Tribolonotus choiseulensis Rittmeyer & Austin, 2017; Tribolonotus gracilis de Rooij, 1909 – red-eyed crocodile skink, red-eyed bush crocodile skink; Tribolonotus novaeguineae (Schlegel, 1834) – white-eyed crocodile skink; Tribolonotus parkeri Rittmeyer & Austin, 2017; Tribolonotus ponceleti Kinghorn, 1937 – giant spiny skink, Poncelet's helmet skink; Tribolonotus pseudoponceleti Greer & Parker, 1968 – western crocodile skink, false Poncelet's helmet skink; Tribolonotus schmidti Burt, 1930 – Schmidt's helmet skink, Schmidt's crocodile skink
