= List of reptiles of the Recherche Archipelago =

The Recherche Archipelago, a large island group off the southern coast of Western Australia, is recognised as containing 22 terrestrial reptile species. This is a list of reptiles of the Recherche Archipelago:

Common name	Scientific name
Mallee lashtail dragon	Amphibolurus norrisi
Ornate crevice dragon	Ctenophorus ornatus
Western marbled gecko	Christinus marmoratus
Barking gecko	Underwoodisaurus milii
Southern heath monitor	Varanus rosenbergi
Southwestern cool skink	Acritoscincus trilineatus
Cream-striped fence skink	Cryptoblepharus virgatus clarus
Red-legged skink	Ctenotus labillardieri
King's skink	Egernia kingii
Bull-headed skink	Liopholis multiscutata
Southwestern crevice skink	Egernia napoleonis
Four-toed mulch skink	Hemiergis peronii peronii
Southern four-toed lerista	Lerista dorsalis
South Coast five-toed lerista	Lerista microtis intermedia
Southern pale-flecked morethia	Morethia obscura
Western bobtail	Tiliqua rugosa rugosa
Southern carpet python	Morelia spilota imbricata
Southern death adder	Acanthophis antarcticus
Crowned snake	Elapognathus coronatus
Recherche Island dugite	Pseudonaja affinis tanneri
