= Liopholis aputja =

Central Ranges rock-skink

Scientific classification
- Kingdom: Animalia
- Phylum: Chordata
- Class: Reptilia
- Order: Squamata
- Family: Scincidae
- Genus: Liopholis
- Species: L. aputja

Binomial name
- Liopholis aputja Farquhar et al, 2024

Species of Australian skink

Liopholis aputja, also known as the Central Ranges rock-skink, is a species of skink, a lizard in the family Scincidae. The species is endemic to central Australia.

== Etymology ==
The specific epithet aputja means “of the hills” in the Pitjantjatjara and Yankunytjatjara dialects of the Western Desert language spoken within the species' range, with reference to its preferred habitat.

== Discovery ==
The species was described following a scientific collecting expedition by Monash University researchers to the Aṉangu Pitjantjatjara Yankunytjatjara (APY) lands of north-western South Australia, where the team worked with the traditional owners, being assisted by the Anangu Rangers with local knowledge and by access to particular sites.

== Taxonomy ==
The species was described in 2024. Following morphological and molecular analysis, Liopholis aputja was split from its closest congener Liopholis margaretae. The degree of genetic divergence between the two taxa indicates genetic separation took place during the aridifying environmental conditions of the Late Miocene.

== Description ==
The Central Ranges rock skink is a moderately large and robust Liopholis species, with a snout–vent length (SVL) of up to 135 millimetres (5.3 in) and a tail length up to 158 millimetres (6.2 in). The back, sides, limbs and tail are coloured dull orangish-brown with thin black scale margins, with the top and sides of the head a more vibrant orangish shade. There are also distinctive arrangements of the supraciliary scales and ear lobes on the head.

== Distribution and habitat ==
Both L. margaretae and L. aputja are found in central Australia. However, the former appears to be largely confined to the MacDonnell Ranges bioregion of the southern Northern Territory, while L. aputja is only known from the Mann-Musgrave Ranges of the Central Ranges bioregion of north-western South Australia and extreme south-western Northern Territory. The holotype was collected in Alalkanya Gorge, 13 kilometres (8.1 mi) north of Pukatja in the eastern Musgrave Ranges, in 2005. The two bioregions are separated by Lake Amadeus and other salt lakes in the Amadeus Basin, which form a 180-kilometre (110 mi) biogeographical barrier affecting rock-dwelling fauna. L. aputja also appears to favour higher elevations in rocky country, with other local Liopholis species preferring sandplain habitats.

== Behaviour ==
L. aputja constructs burrow systems in the soil beneath rocks and into soil-filled rock crevices. It is mainly diurnal but is sometimes active at night in hot weather.
