= Mountain skink =

Mountain skink may refer to:

- Chalcides montanus from Morocco
- Liopholis montana from continental Australia
- Plestiodon callicephalus from Arizona, New Mexico, and north-western Mexico
- Eutropis clivicola from India
- Niveoscincus orocryptus from Tasmania
