= Blanchard's helmet skink =

Conservation status
- Least Concern (IUCN 3.1)

Scientific classification
- Kingdom: Animalia
- Phylum: Chordata
- Class: Reptilia
- Order: Squamata
- Family: Scincidae
- Genus: Tribolonotus
- Species: T. blanchardi

Binomial name
- Tribolonotus blanchardi Burt, 1930
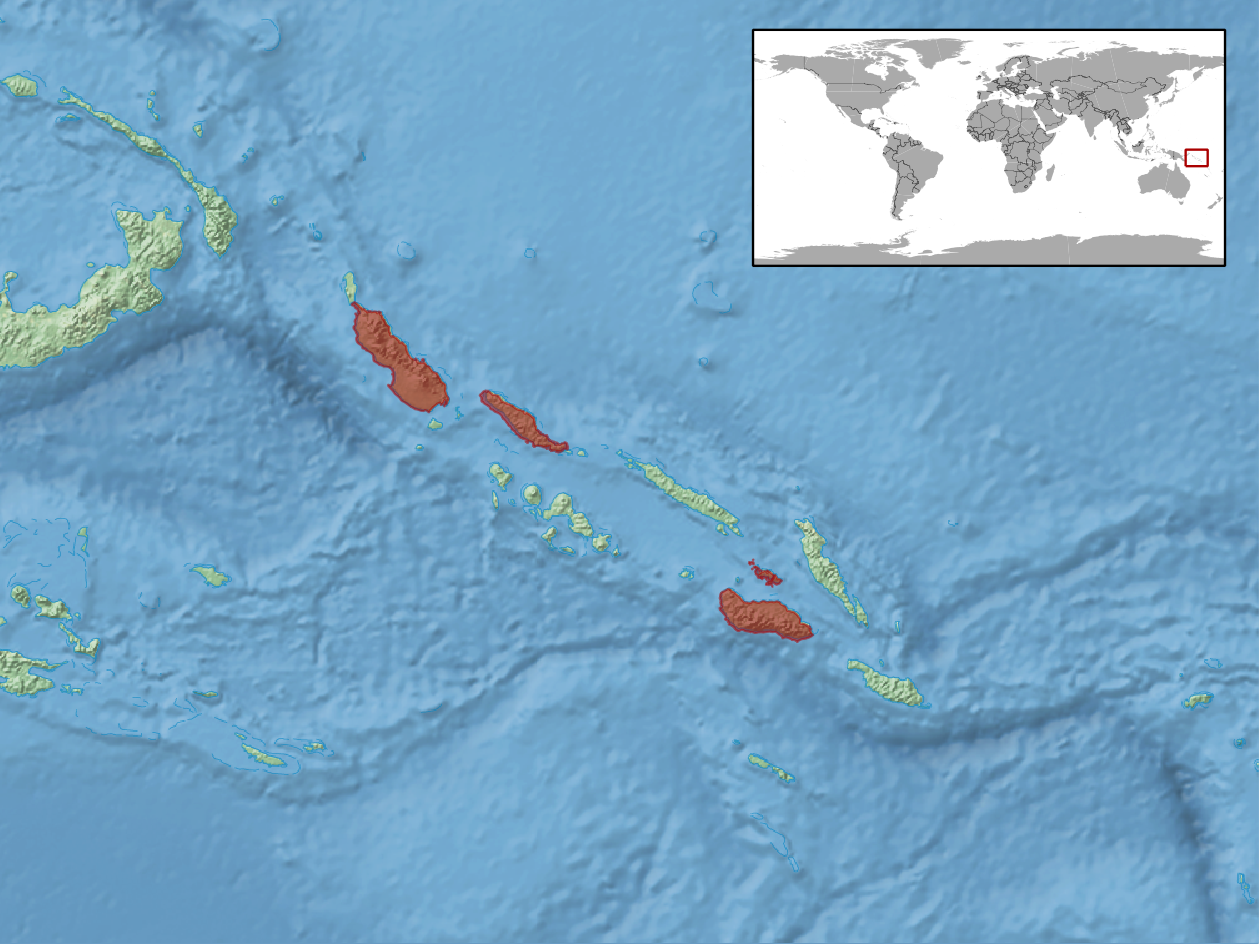

Species of lizard

Blanchard's helmet skink (Tribolonotus blanchardi) is a species of lizard in the subfamily Egerniinae of the family Scincidae. The species is endemic to the Solomon Islands archipelago.

== Etymology ==
The specific name, blanchardi, is in honor of American herpetologist Frank N. Blanchard.

== Geographic range ==
Within the Solomon Islands archipelago Tribolonotus blanchardi is found on Bougainville Island, which is governed by Papua New Guinea, and on Choiseul Island, Guadalcanal, and the Nggela Islands, which are governed by the sovereign country of the Solomon Islands.

== Habitat ==
The preferred natural habitat of Tribolonotus blanchardi is forest, at altitudes of 100–1,000 m (330–3,280 ft).

== Reproduction ==
Tribolonotus blanchardi is oviparous. Clutch size is one egg.
