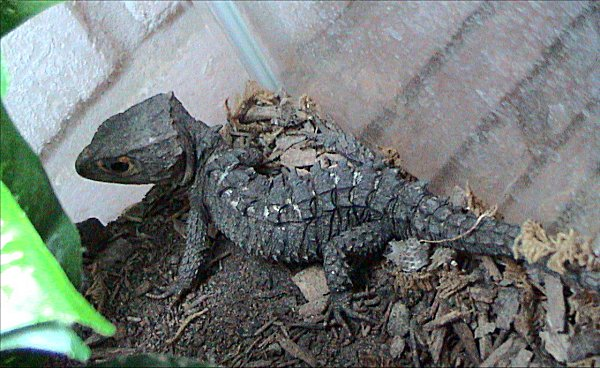
- Red-eyed crocodile skink (Tribolonotus gracilis)

Scientific classification
- Kingdom: Animalia
- Phylum: Chordata
- Class: Reptilia
- Order: Squamata
- Family: Scincidae
- Subfamily: Egerniinae
- Genus: Tribolonotus; A.M.C. Duméril & Bibron, 1839

Type species
- Tribolonotus novaeguineae

= Tribolonotus =

Genus of lizards

Tribolonotus is a genus of lizards, commonly known as crocodile skinks.

== Geographic range ==
Species in the genus Tribolonotus are found in New Guinea, the Bismarck Archipelago, and the Solomon Islands.

== Species ==
The genus includes the following 10 species:

Image	Common name	Scientific name	Distribution
	Zweifel's helmet skink, New Britain spiny skink	Tribolonotus annectens Zweifel, 1966	New Britain
	Blanchard's helmet skink	Tribolonotus blanchardi Burt, 1930	Bougainville and the Solomon Islands
	Admiralty spiny skink, Brongersma's helmet skink	Tribolonotus brongersmai Cogger, 1973	Admiralty Islands
		Tribolonotus choiseulensis Rittmeyer & Austin, 2017	Solomon Islands
	red-eyed crocodile skink, red-eyed bush crocodile skink	Tribolonotus gracilis de Rooij, 1909	New Guinea
	white-eyed crocodile skink	Tribolonotus novaeguineae (Schlegel, 1834)	Irian Jaya and Papua New Guinea
		Tribolonotus parkeri Rittmeyer & Austin, 2017	Buka Island
	Giant spiny skink, Poncelet's helmet skink	Tribolonotus ponceleti Kinghorn, 1937	Solomon Islands
	Western crocodile skink, false Poncelet's helmet skink	Tribolonotus pseudoponceleti Greer & Parker, 1968	Bougainville and Buka
	Schmidt's helmet skink, Schmidt's crocodile skink	Tribolonotus schmidti Burt, 1930	Guadalcanal in the Solomon Islands

Nota bene: A binomial authority in parentheses indicates that the species was originally described in a genus other than Tribolonotus.
