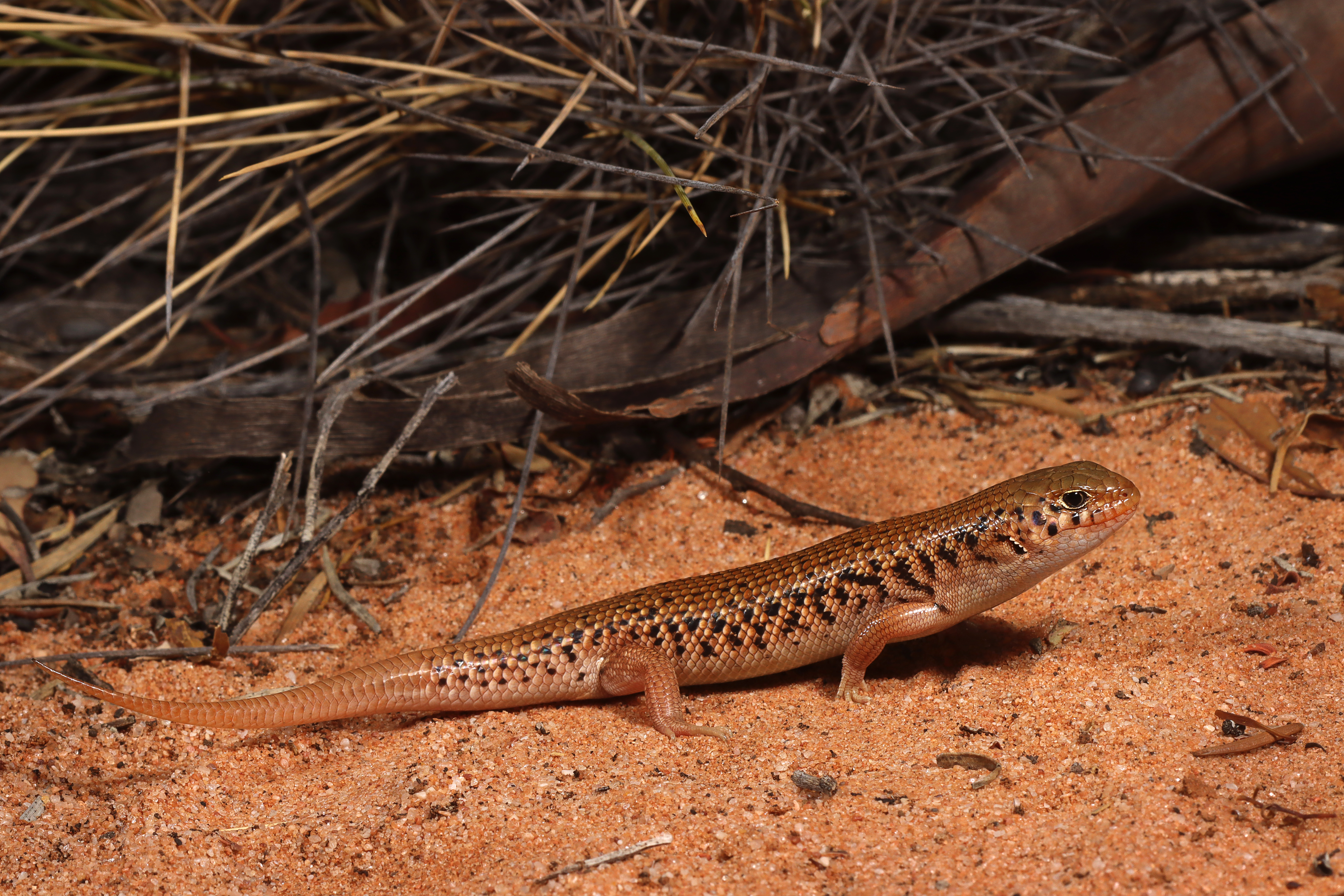

Conservation status
- Least Concern (IUCN 3.1)

Scientific classification
- Kingdom: Animalia
- Phylum: Chordata
- Class: Reptilia
- Order: Squamata
- Family: Scincidae
- Genus: Liopholis
- Species: L. inornata

Binomial name
- Liopholis inornata (Rosén, 1905)
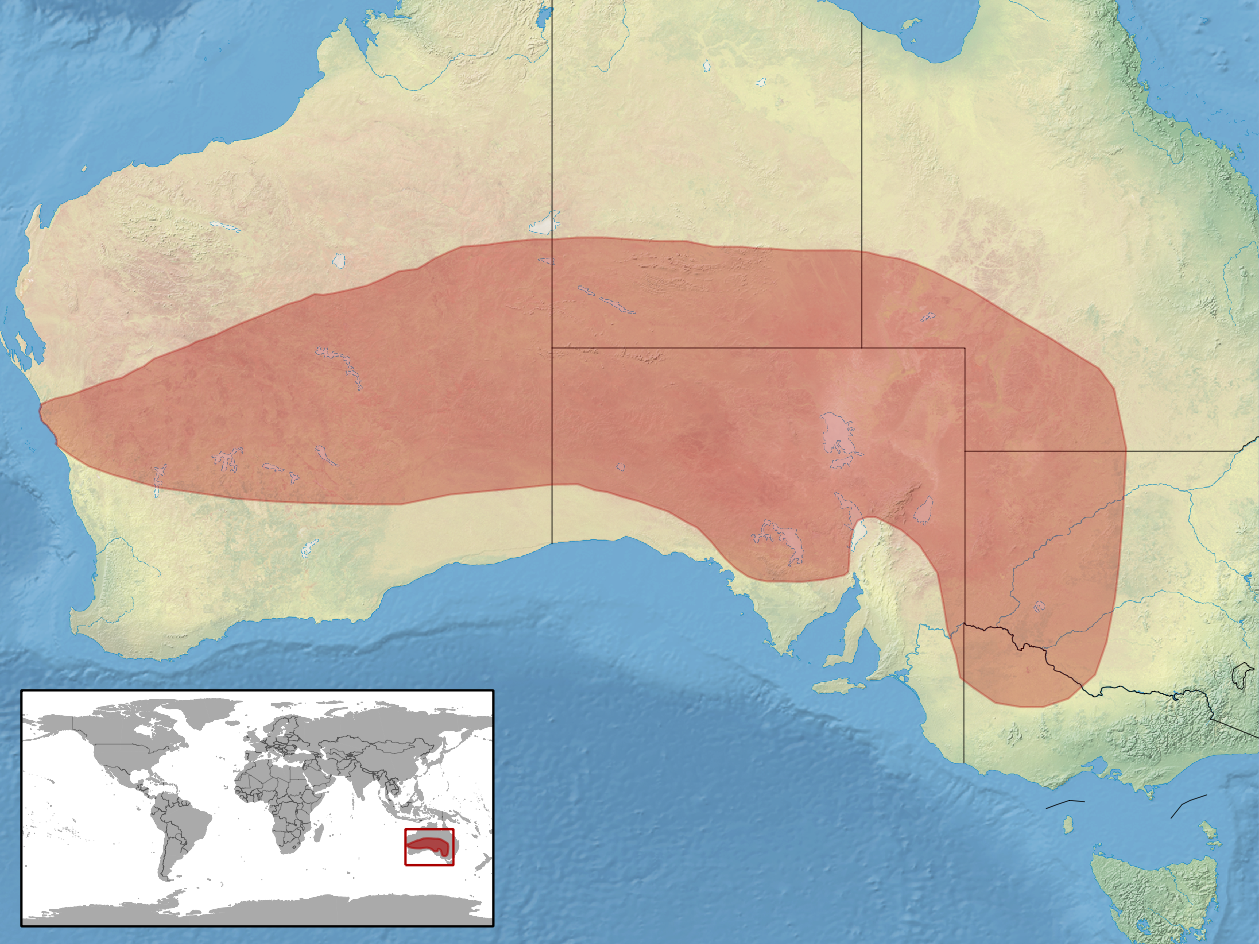
- Distribution of the desert egernia

Synonyms
- Egernia inornata Rosén, 1905

= Desert egernia =

Species of lizard

The desert egernia, unadorned desert-skink or desert skink (Liopholis inornata) is a species of skink, a lizard in the family Scincidae. The desert egernia is endemic to the continent of Australia, and is widespread, with populations recorded in all mainland states and territories except the Australian Capital Territory. The desert egernia is found in dry, desert areas with deep, uncompacted sandy/loamy soils and little significant vegetation cover.

== Description ==
The desert egernia is a medium-sized terrestrial lizard. It has pale to reddish-brown colouring with cream coloured spots along the tips of the scales on its back and sides with scale colours often darkening towards the head. It has a pale, creamy white-to-yellow underside and white ventral area and its limbs are often paler than the rest of the body.

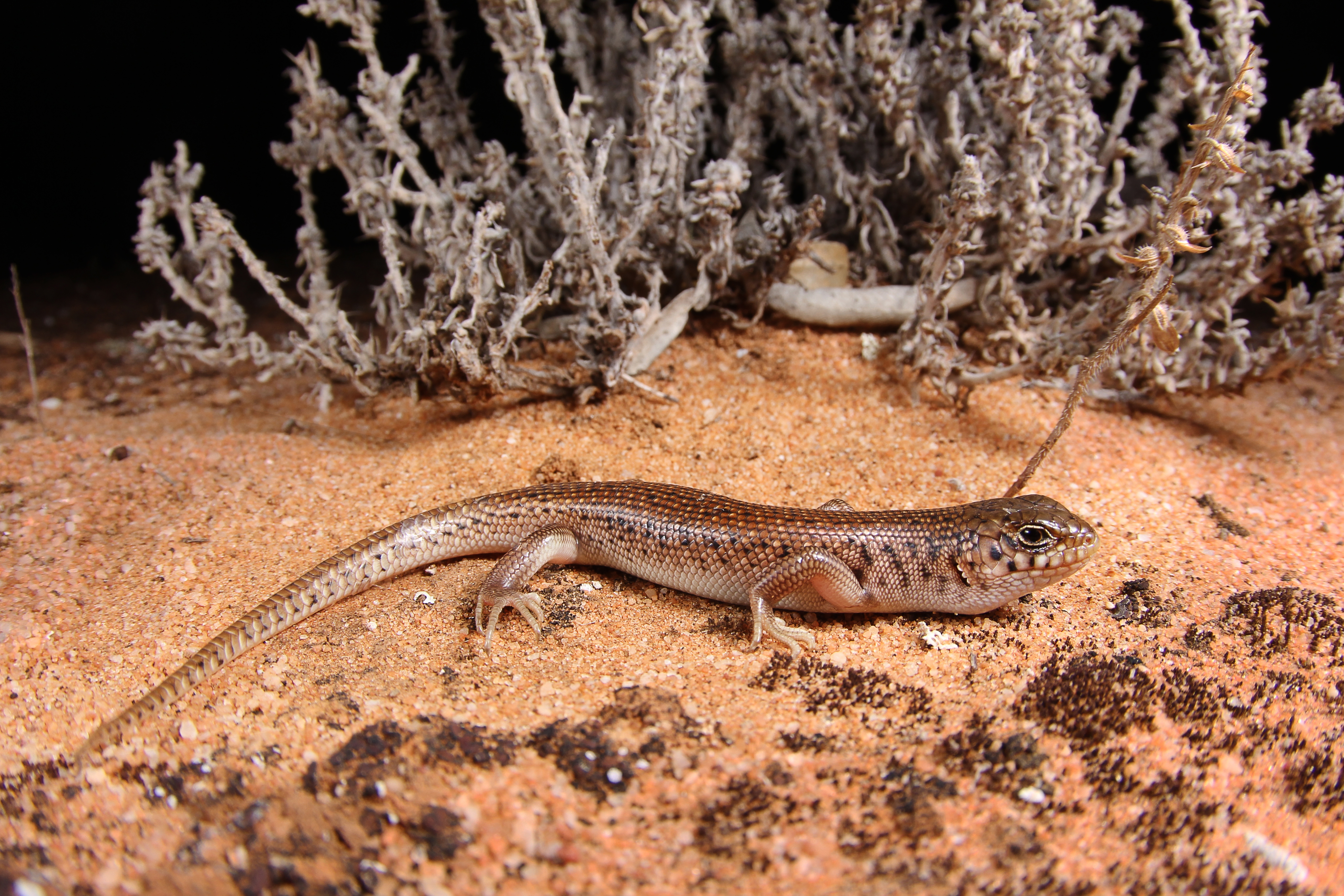
Desert egernia under spotlight

Like most burrowing lizard species, the desert egernia has a narrow body and strong, small legs to increase burrowing efficiency and reduce energy expenditure.

The tail of the desert egernia is usually slightly longer than the snout-vent length of the lizard, is round and tapering, similarly coloured to the body with little variation. A defining feature of this species is the length of its fourth toe, which is substantially longer than the third toe.

Adults usually measure between 75mm and 84mm snout-to-vent and 165mm to 184mm snout-to-tail. There is no significant size difference between male and female in this species.

Unlike many other species within the skink family, the desert egernia has not been found to exhibit any pattern of colour pattern polymorphism (CPP). This may be due to the heterogenous nature of arid areas within Australia compared to areas with other climatic conditions, and species' effective camouflage against the soils of its habitat as a measure to avoid predators.

== Taxonomy ==
The desert egernia was first classified by Rosén in 1905 as Egernia inornata. In 2008, the genus Egernia was split into four new genus' following a taxonomic review by Gardner et al. showing distinct phylogenetic differences in many members of Egernia. As a result of the taxonomic review of Egernia, Egernia inornata was reclassified to Liopholis inornata.

== Distribution ==
The majority of the desert egernia's range falls within central Western Australia, most of inland South Australia, southern Northern Territory, south-west Queensland, western New South Wales and a small part of north-west Victoria. Due to its large range and relative abundance, the desert egernia has been assessed as being of 'Least Concern' of endangerment by the IUCN Red List. The desert egernia is protected by state legislation in Victoria, designated threatened due to its small range.

== Ecology and habitat ==
The desert egernia is a xerocole, having formed many adaptions to live in dry, arid areas. It is an obligate burrower, meaning that it exclusively habitates burrows of its own construction as an adaption to the harsh, arid climate it occurs in. It has mostly been observed to be crepuscular to nocturnal, but has been known to be active during the day at times, usually to bask or to take advantage of conditions in which termites are most active. The desert egernia typically resides in areas with deep, uncompacted sandy/loamy soils and is more likely to exist higher on sand ridges than close relatives occurring within a similar range, such as the Night Skink (Liopholis striata).

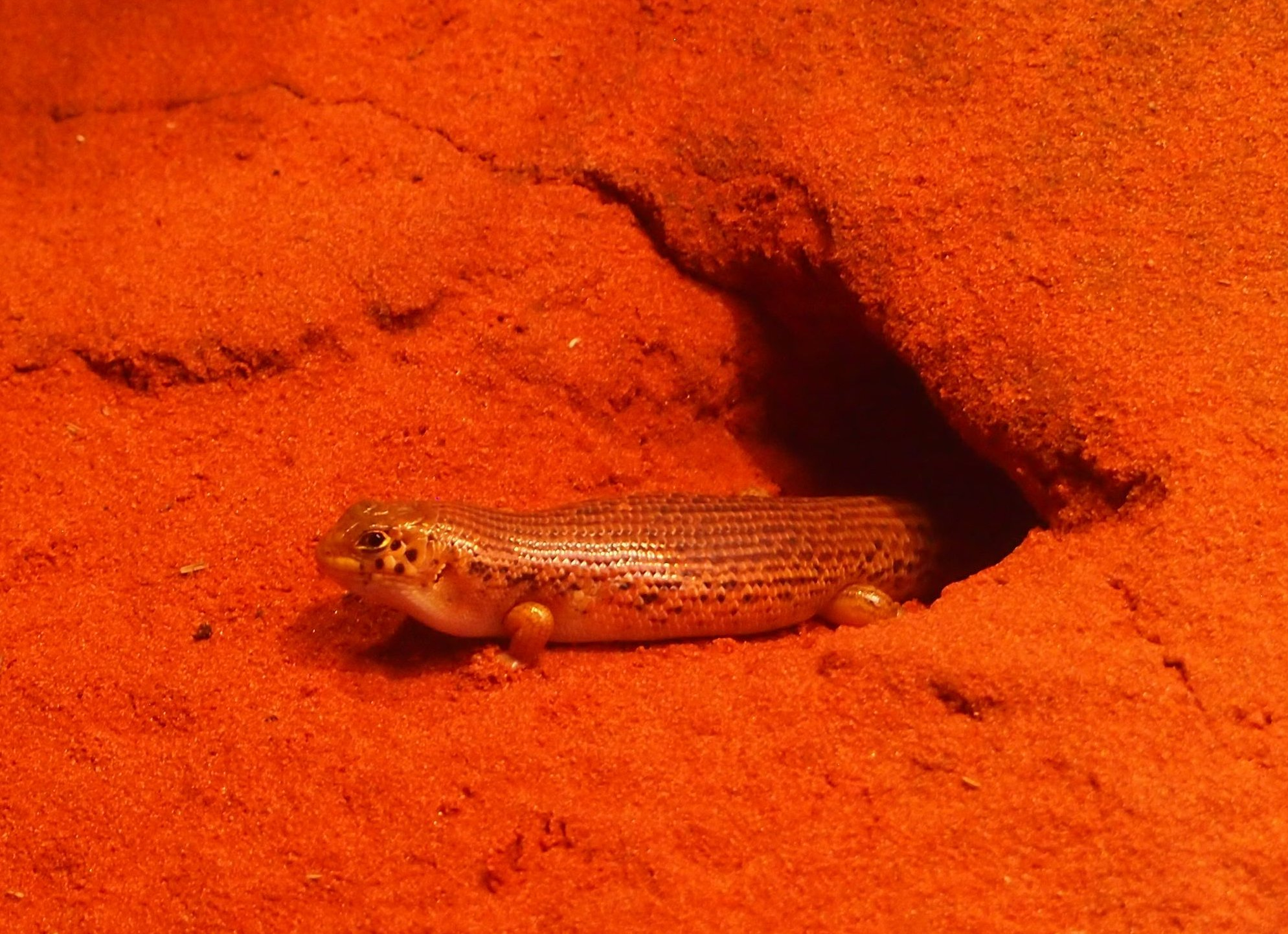
Desert egernia sitting in the mouth of its burrow

The burrow of the desert egernia is often uncomplicated compared to other xerocole lizard species. The burrow is usually between 30 cm-50 cm deep, and is characterised by a pattern of fanned sand surrounding at least one entrance or occasionally piled within a nearby clump of grass. In the most basic configuration, the burrow is constructed in a 'U' shape with two entrances, with one entrance exposed and the other entrance covered by a thin layer of soil. It has been hypothesised that the desert egernia uses the second, covered entrance to escape from predators such as snakes and sand goannas who are aware that blocking the only known entrance will trap the lizard.

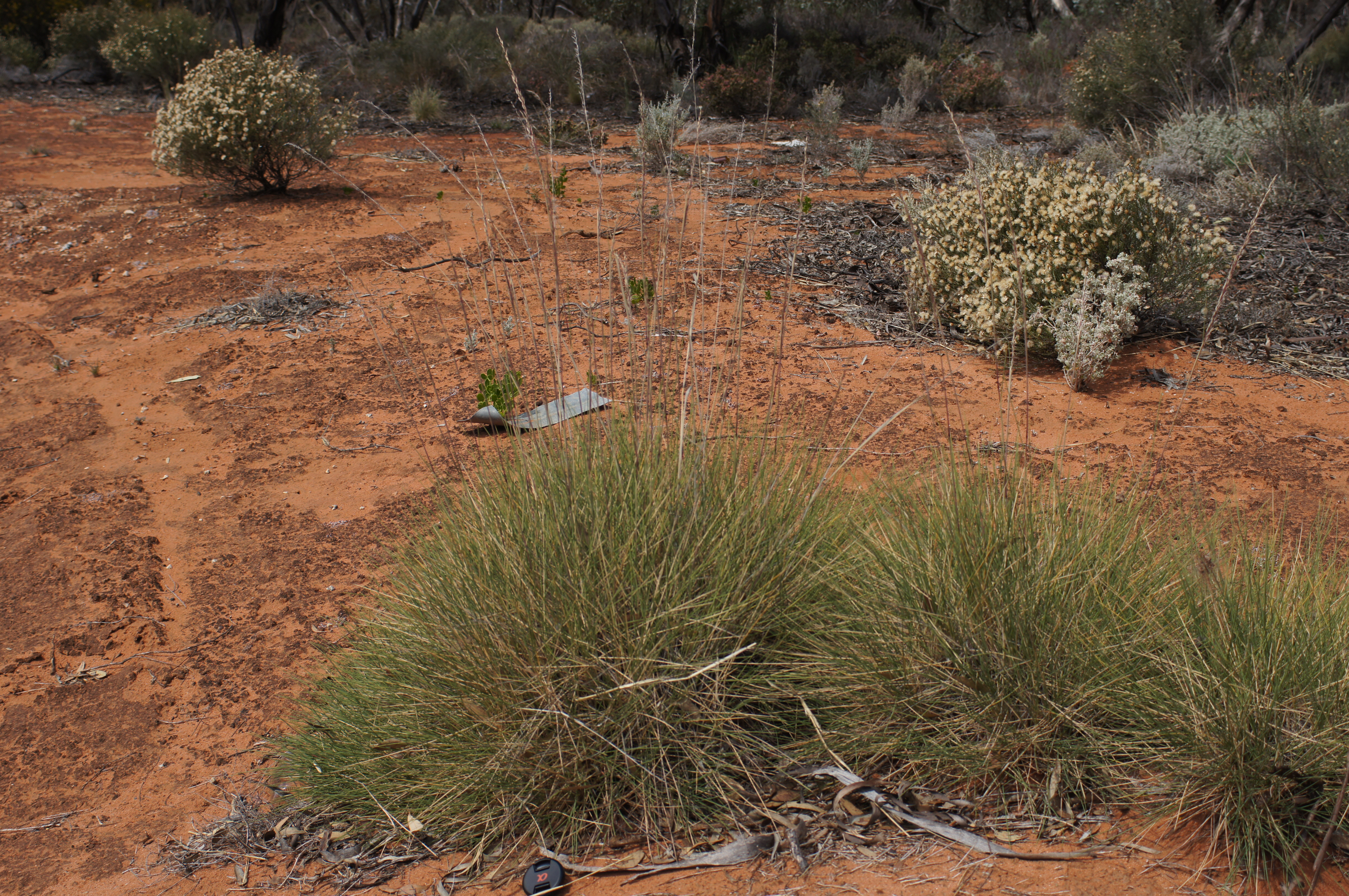
A tussock of porcupine grass - A common site for a desert egernia burrow

In certain geographical locations, such as the Simpson Desert, the desert egernia has been known to construct complex burrows with multiple exposed entrances. The entrance of the burrow most often faces north or north-west, possibly as a temperature regulation strategy as the desert egernia does not often stray from its burrow and an entrance with these bearings may allow the entrance of the burrow to be exposed to an appropriate amount of sunlight. Prior to winter, the entrances to the burrow are often sealed off to aid in thermoregulation through the hibernation period. The desert egernia is known to frequently move between burrow sites.

In addition to being a specialist of xeric environments, the desert egernia is thought to be a fire specialist, with the species often being found in greater abundance in recently burnt sites than sites in which vegetation has not experienced fire for many years.

== Reproduction and sociality ==
The desert egernia is viviparous, meaning that it bears live young. Its breeding season normally falls between September and early May, and has been known to bear two litters in a season. It usually produces between 1-4 offspring, with an average litter size of 2.1. This small litter size relative to other members of Liopholis has been attributed to its relatively small body size compared to other members of the genus. The desert egernia reaches sexual maturity within two years.

The desert egernia is thought to be mostly monogamous. Unlike most other members of Liopholis and the former Egernia which have mostly been observed to be social and family-living, the desert egernia is a solitary species that has not displayed significant trends in social associations with other members of the genus or its own offspring.

== Diet ==
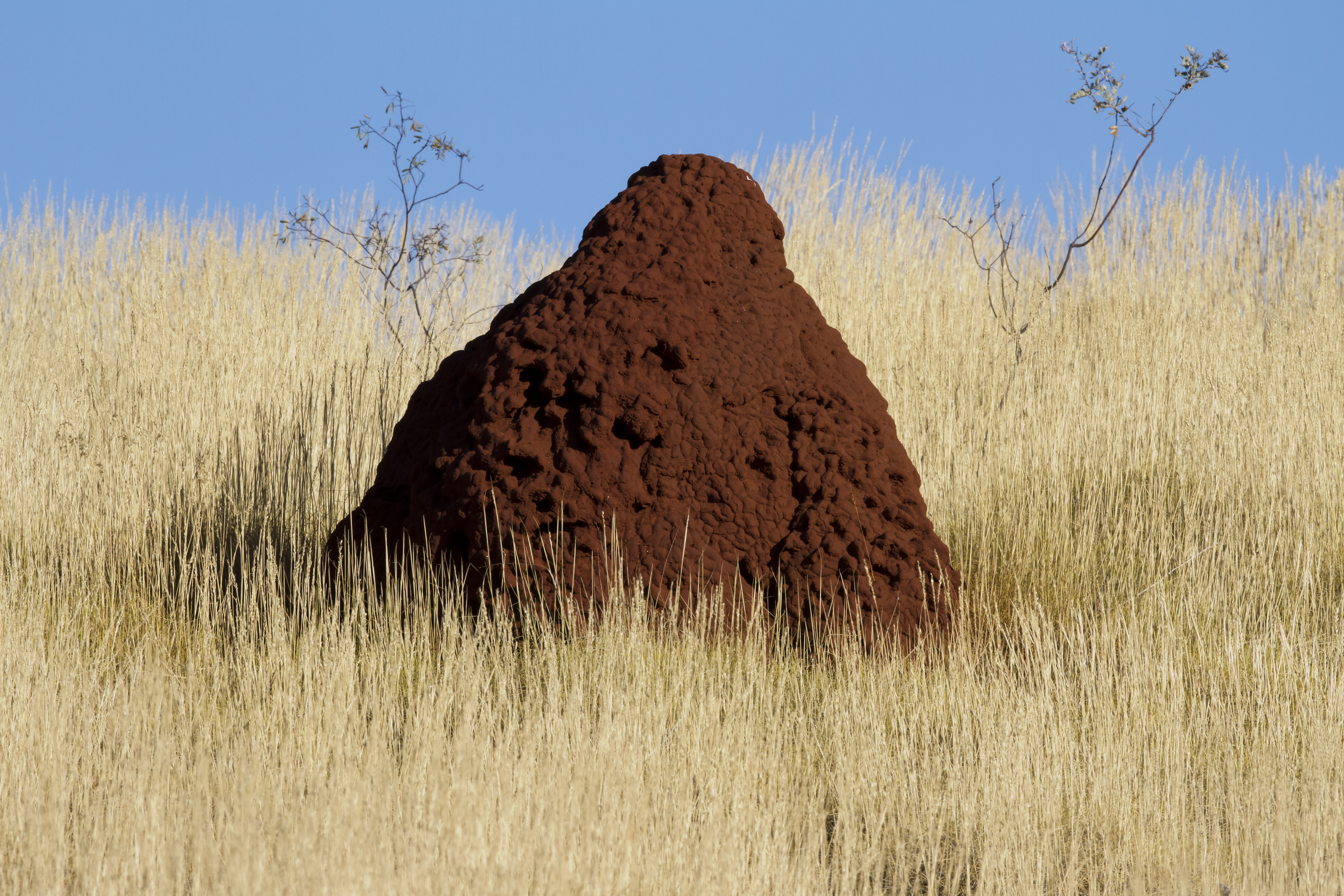
A termite mound within spinifex grass cover - an important source of food for the desert egernia

The desert egernia is mostly insectivorous, with its diet consisting of mostly ants and termites, observed to make up over 80% of its diet in one study. The remainder of the diet of the desert egernia consists of larger insects such as spiders and beetles, and occasionally plant material and other lizards. Its foraging activity mostly takes place in areas within close proximity of its burrow entrance. It is mostly an opportunistic ambush predator, waiting within the entrance to its burrow complex, which is usually located at the base of a clump or grass or a shrub where insects frequent, and ambushing passing prey.

== Predation ==
The desert egernia has been known to be a popular prey of many other native desert species, such as ringed brown snakes and sand goannas, with the former being observed to predate the desert egernia by entering burrows, vacant or occupied and either consuming the lizard upon entry or ambushing the lizard entering the burrow. The desert egernia is also frequently preyed upon by introduced mammals such as cats and foxes, who are able to identify its presence within an area by its distinctive burrows. The tendency of the desert egernia to frequently change burrow sites may be an adaption to predation by these species.
