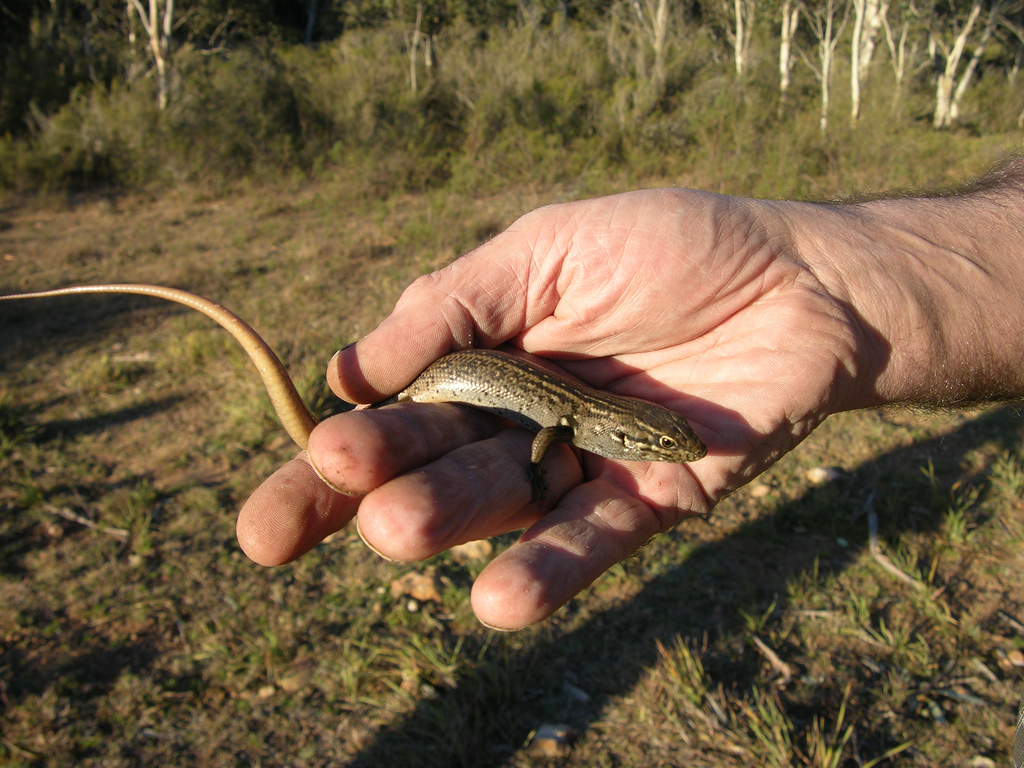
- White's skink (Liopholis whitii)

Scientific classification
- Kingdom: Animalia
- Phylum: Chordata
- Class: Reptilia
- Order: Squamata
- Family: Scincidae
- Subfamily: Egerniinae
- Genus: Liopholis; Fitzinger, 1843

Type species
- Lygosoma moniligera A.M.C. Duméril & Bibron, 1839

Species
- 15 species (see text)

Synonyms
- Flamoscincus; Wells & Wellington, 1984

= Liopholis =

Genus of lizards

Liopholis is a genus of lizards in the subfamily Egerniinae of the family Scincidae (skinks). Species of the genus are found in the Australian region. They were previously placed in the genus Egernia.

== Description ==
Liopholis are smallish to largish-sized skinks. They may attain an adult snout-to-vent length (SVL) of 75–200 mm (3.0–7.9 in), with a bulky angular body. They have 34–52 rows of scales at midbody; the dorsal scales are usually smooth. The nasal scale has no postnarial groove; the subocular scale row is incomplete. The eyes are relatively large, and the eyelids usually have conspicuous cream-coloured margins.

== Species ==
There are 15 recognized species:

Image	Scientific name	Common name	Distribution
	Liopholis aputja Farquhar et al., 2024	Central Ranges rock skink	North-western South Australia.
	Liopholis guthega Donnellan, Hutchinson, Dempsey & Osborne, 2002	Snowy Mountains skink, guthega skink, alpine egernia	south-eastern Australia.
	Liopholis inornata (Rosén, 1905)	desert egernia, unadorned desert-skink, "desert skink"	central Western Australia, most of inland South Australia, southern Northern Territory, south-west Queensland, western New South Wales and a small part of north-west Victoria
	Liopholis kintorei (Stirling & Zietz, 1893)	Great Desert skink	Northern Territory and Western Australia.
	Liopholis margaretae (Storr, 1968)	MacDonnell Ranges rock-skink, Flinder's Ranges rock-skink	central Australia.
	Liopholis modesta (Storr, 1968)	Eastern Ranges rock-skink	eastern Australia
	Liopholis montana Donnellan, Hutchinson, Dempsey & Osborne, 2002	montane rock-skink, mountain egernia, "mountain skink"	south-eastern Australia
	Liopholis multiscutata (Mitchell & Behrndt, 1949)	bull skink, southern sand-skink, heath skink	southern Australia
	Liopholis parva (Aplin et al., 2024)		north-western Australia
	Liopholis personata (Storr, 1968)		southern Australia
	Liopholis pulchra (F. Werner, 1910)	southwestern rock-skink, spectacled rock skink, Jurien Bay rock-skink	south-western Australia
	Liopholis purnululu (Aplin et al., 2024)		north-western Australia
	Liopholis slateri (Storr, 1968)	Slater's desert skink, Centralian Floodplains desert-skink, Slater's egernia, Slater's skink	Northern Territory and Southern Australia in central Australia
	Liopholis striata (Sternfeld, 1919)	night skink, nocturnal desert-skink, striated egernia	western Australia
	Liopholis whitii (Lacépède, 1804)	White's skink, White's rock-skink	south-eastern Australia, including Tasmania and many Bass Strait islands

Nota bene: A binomial authority in parentheses indicates that the species was originally described in a genus other than Liopholis.
