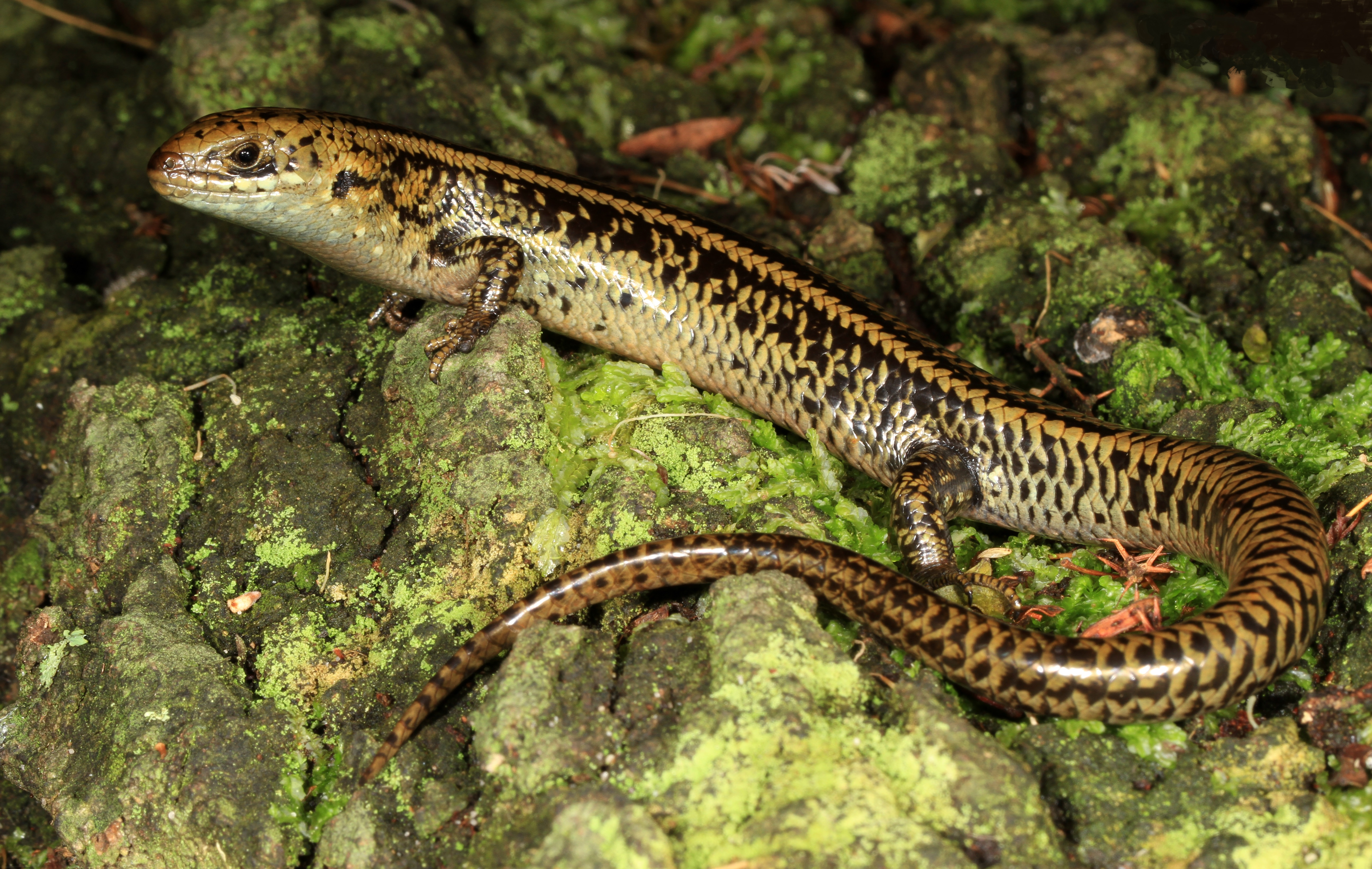
- Eastern mourning skink (Lissolepis coventryi)

Scientific classification
- Domain: Eukaryota
- Kingdom: Animalia
- Phylum: Chordata
- Class: Reptilia
- Order: Squamata
- Family: Scincidae
- Subfamily: Egerniinae
- Genus: Lissolepis; Peters, 1872

Species
- 2 species (see text)

= Lissolepis =

Genus of lizards

Lissolepis is a genus of mid-sized skinks (adult snout-vent length 100–130 mm) with a bulky angular body and small eyes. 20–28 rows of midbody scales; dorsal scales smooth. The nasal scale has a postnarial groove; the subocular scale row is complete. Eyelids similar in colour to the adjacent scales. They were previously placed in the genus Egernia.

== Species ==
Image	Name	Distribution
	Lissolepis coventryi (Storr, 1978) – eastern mourning skink	South Australia, Victoria, and possibly New South Wales.
	Lissolepis luctuosa (W. Peters, 1866) – western mourning skink, western glossy swamp skink	Western Australia

Nota bene: A binomial authority in parentheses indicates that the species was originally described in a genus other than Lissolepis.
