= Zweifel's helmet skink =

Conservation status
- Data Deficient (IUCN 3.1)

Scientific classification
- Kingdom: Animalia
- Phylum: Chordata
- Class: Reptilia
- Order: Squamata
- Family: Scincidae
- Genus: Tribolonotus
- Species: T. annectens

Binomial name
- Tribolonotus annectens Zweifel, 1966

Species of lizard

Zweifel's helmet skink or New Britain spiny skink (Tribolonotus annectens) is a species of lizard in the family Scincidae. The species is endemic to New Britain.
