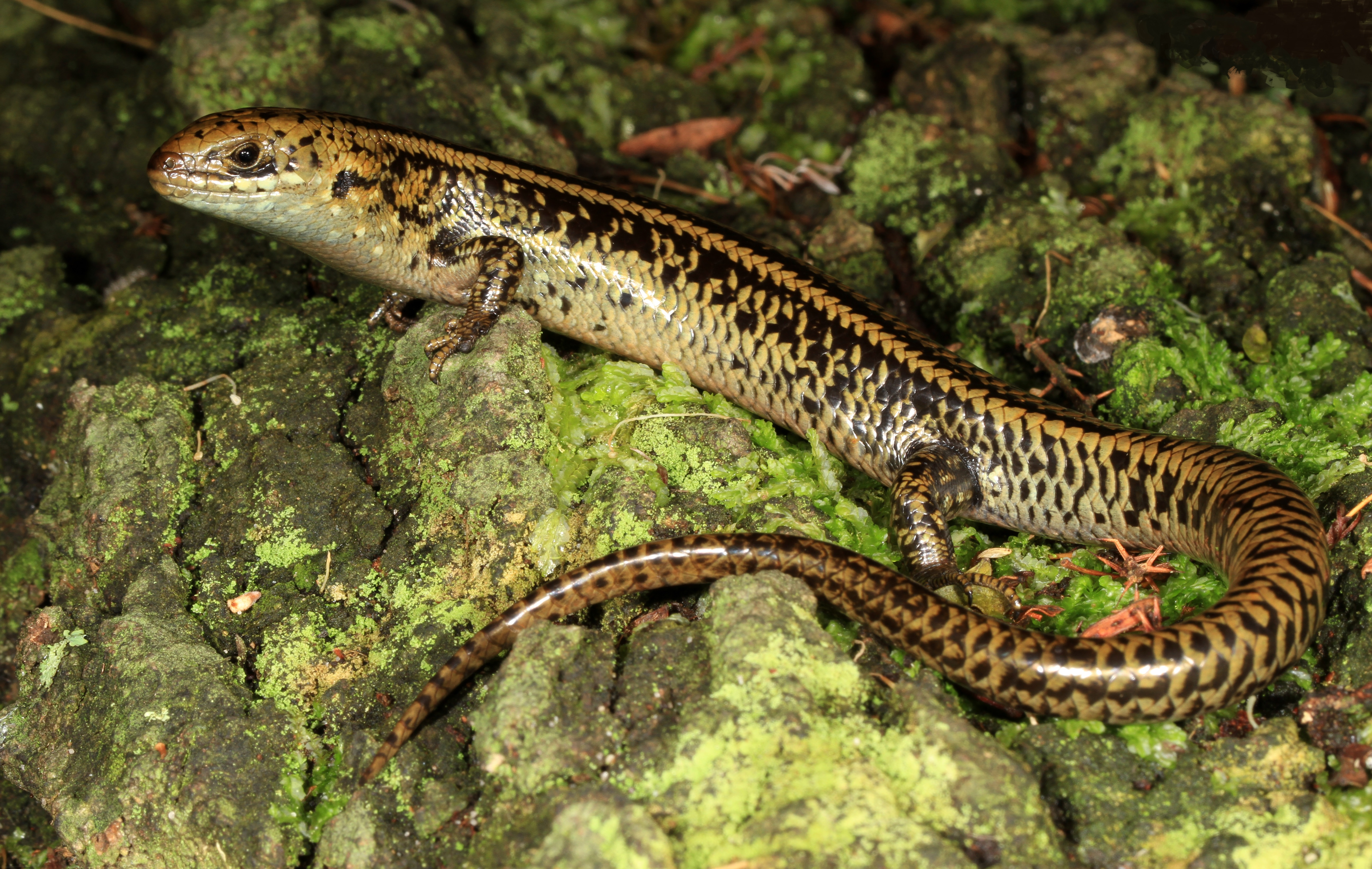

Conservation status
- Endangered (IUCN 3.1)

Scientific classification
- Kingdom: Animalia
- Phylum: Chordata
- Class: Reptilia
- Order: Squamata
- Family: Scincidae
- Genus: Lissolepis
- Species: L. coventryi

Binomial name
- Lissolepis coventryi (Storr, 1978)

Synonyms
- Egernia coventryi Storr, 1978; Lissolepis coventryi — Gardner et al., 2008

= Eastern mourning skink =

Species of lizard

The eastern mourning skink (Lissolepis coventryi), also known commonly as Coventry's spinytail skink and the swamp skink, is a species of lizard in the family Scincidae. The species is endemic to Australia.

== Etymology ==
The specific name, coventryi, is in honor of Australian herpetologist Albert John Coventry.

== Geographic range ==
L. coventryi is found in the Australian states of South Australia, Victoria, and possibly New South Wales.

== Habitat ==
The preferred natural habitat of L. coventryi is freshwater wetlands such as marshes and swamps.

== Description ==
L. coventryi has an average snout-to-vent length (SVL) of 10 cm (3.9 in), with a long tail, which is almost one and a half times SVL, 15 cm (5.9 in)).

== Reproduction ==
L. coventryi is viviparous.
