= Western mourning skink =

Conservation status
- Least Concern (IUCN 3.1)

Scientific classification
- Kingdom: Animalia
- Phylum: Chordata
- Class: Reptilia
- Order: Squamata
- Family: Scincidae
- Genus: Lissolepis
- Species: L. luctuosa

Binomial name
- Lissolepis luctuosa (Peters, 1866)

Synonyms
- Cyclodus luctuosus Peters, 1866; Egernia lauta De Vis, 1888; Egernia luctuosa (Peters, 1866)

Species of lizard

The western mourning skink (Lissolepis luctuosa) is a species of skink, a lizard in the family Scincidae. It is also called the western glossy swamp skink.

The species is endemic to Australia and is found in the state of Western Australia.
