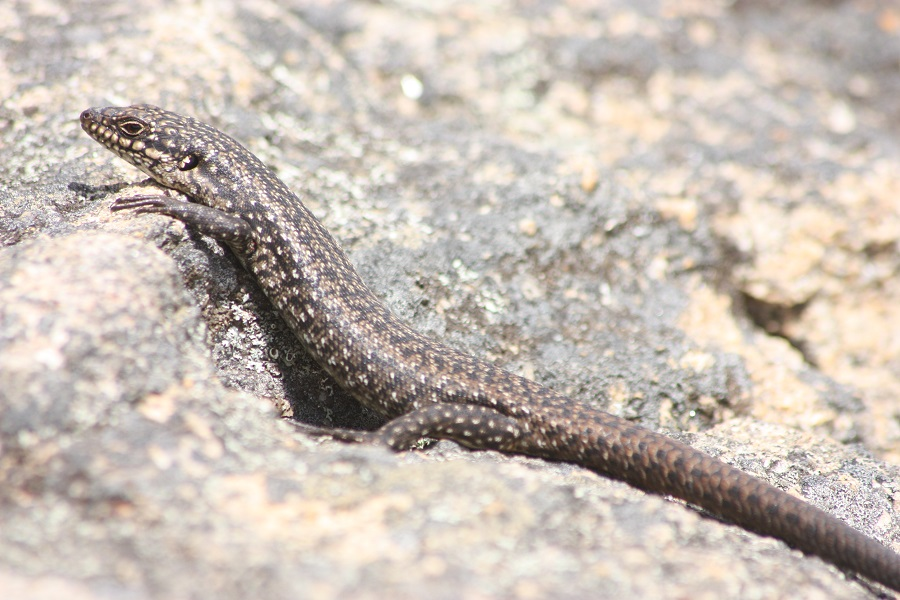
- Egernia napoleonis

Conservation status
- Least Concern (IUCN 3.1)

Scientific classification
- Kingdom: Animalia
- Phylum: Chordata
- Class: Reptilia
- Order: Squamata
- Family: Scincidae
- Genus: Egernia
- Species: E. napoleonis

Binomial name
- Egernia napoleonis (Gray, 1838)

Synonyms
- Tiliqua Napoleonis Gray, 1838

= Southwestern crevice-skink =

Species of lizard

The southwestern crevice-skink (Egernia napoleonis), also known commonly as the south-western crevice skink and the Napoleon skink, is a species of large skink, a lizard in the subfamily Egerniinae of the family Scincidae. The species is endemic to the Australian state of Western Australia.

== Etymology ==
The specific name, napoleonis, refers to Terre Napoléon, a former name for parts of southern Australia.

== Description ==
Adults of Egernia napoleonis usually have a snout-to-vent length (SVL) of about 13.5 cm (5.3 in). The body is robust and relatively flattened. The dorsal scales are keeled, with two to four sharp keels per scale. Dorsally, the colouration is olive brown, with small darker spots which tend to align in three longitudinal series. There is a broad pale zone on the flanks. Ventrally, it is salmon pink to orangish brown.

== Geographic distribution ==
Egernia naploleonis is found in southwestern Western Australia including islands of the Recherche Archipelago.

== Habitat ==
The preferred natural habitats of Egernia napoleonis are forest, shrubland, and rocky outcrops.

== Behaviour ==
Egernia napoleonis is both arboreal and saxicolous (rock-dwelling), sheltering under bark and in rock crevices.

== Reproduction ==
Egernia napoleonis is ovoviviparous.
