= Montane rock-skink =

Conservation status
- Near Threatened (IUCN 3.1)

Scientific classification
- Kingdom: Animalia
- Phylum: Chordata
- Class: Reptilia
- Order: Squamata
- Family: Scincidae
- Genus: Liopholis
- Species: L. montana

Binomial name
- Liopholis montana (Donnellan, Hutchinson, Dempsey & Osborne, 2002)

Species of lizard

The montane rock-skink, mountain egernia or mountain skink (Liopholis montana) is a species of skink, a lizard in the family Scincidae. The species is endemic to southeastern Australia.

== Distribution ==
The Mountain Skink is found is isolated populations in suitable rocky woodland habitat throughout southeastern Australia, in montane to alpine environments up to 1800 meters elevation. The species has been recorded from Victoria, New South Wales, and the ACT.

A 2021 paper identified a population of the species in the Wombat State Forest in the Western Uplands of Victoria, over 150 kilometers further west of the species known extent at the time. The paper also expanded the known elevational range of the species, with the new population recorded at 620 meters elevation. The species may inhabit lower elevation montane habitat throughout central and western Victoria, but has gone undiscovered, or misidentified as the visually similar White's skink.

== Morphology ==
The Mountain Skink is a robust, medium-sized skink (snout-vent length up to 111 mm). Two color pattern morphs are known, the 'plain-backed' morph (no dorsal markings), and the rarer 'patterned' morph (with dorsal markings). Both morphs are known to exist within the same population.

== Conservation status and threats ==
The Mountain Skink is listed as nationally Endangered under the EPBC Act.

Threats to the species include:

- Introduced predators (cats, foxes)
- Loss of habitat (logging and global warming)
- Fire (too frequent or intense)
- Rock displacement and removal
- Poaching
