= Western crocodile skink =

Conservation status
- Least Concern (IUCN 3.1)

Scientific classification
- Kingdom: Animalia
- Phylum: Chordata
- Class: Reptilia
- Order: Squamata
- Family: Scincidae
- Genus: Tribolonotus
- Species: T. pseudoponceleti

Binomial name
- Tribolonotus pseudoponceleti Greer & Parker, 1968

Species of lizard

The western crocodile skink or false Poncelet's helmet skink (Tribolonotus pseudoponceleti) is a species of lizard in the family Scincidae. The species is found in Bougainville and Buka.
