= Great desert skink =

Conservation status
- Vulnerable (IUCN 3.1)

Scientific classification
- Kingdom: Animalia
- Phylum: Chordata
- Class: Reptilia
- Order: Squamata
- Family: Scincidae
- Genus: Liopholis
- Species: L. kintorei

Binomial name
- Liopholis kintorei (Stirling & Zietz, 1893)

Synonyms
- Egernia kintorei Stirling & Zietz, 1893; Egernia dahlii Boulenger, 1896; Egernia kintorei — Glauert, 1960; Liopholis kintorei — Gardner et al., 2008

Species of lizard

The great desert skink (Liopholis kintorei or Egernia kintorei), also known commonly as Kintore's egernia and by various other names including tjakura in various Aboriginal Australian languages, is a species of skink, a lizard in the family Scincidae. The species is native to the western half of Australia. It is a burrowing lizard and extremely social.

== Etymology and variant names ==
The species is known as Liopholis kintorei or Egernia kintorei. The specific name, kintorei, is in honour of Algernon Keith-Falconer, 9th Earl of Kintore, a British politician who was a colonial governor of South Australia.

One of the common name of this skink is great desert skink.

Aboriginal Australian names for the skink include tjakura, mulyamiji, tjalapa, warrana (also spelt warrarna), and nampu.

== Description ==
The great desert skink is a medium-sized skink, reaching an average snout-to-vent length (SVL) of 19–20 cm (7.5–7.9 in), weighing around 350 g (12 oz). It has smooth, small, glossy scales and is mostly rust-coloured on the top of the body, with the belly a vanilla colour. It has relatively large circular eyes and a short snout.

They can be distinguished from Egernia striolata because they have more labials and more pointed ear lobules.

== Taxonomy ==
L. kintorei is a species of skink, a lizard in the family Scincidae. The species is endemic to the western half of Australia.

== Distribution and habitat ==
The species is endemic to the western half of Australia, occurring almost exclusively on Aboriginal land. L. kintorei is native to the southwestern quarter of the Northern Territory (NT), dispersed slightly throughout most of Western Australia (WA), and the northwestern corner of South Australia (SA).

As the common name suggests, it is a desert reptile, living in burrows. The burrows can extend up to 12 m (39 ft) in length, and can have as many as 20 entrances.

== Behaviour ==
Researchers found in 2011 that out of over 5,000 species of lizards documented, this species was said to have "unique" behaviour among them with regard to their cooperative behaviour. Individuals of the great desert skink work in cooperation with one another to build and take care of their burrows, even digging out specific rooms for use as a defecatorium. Mates are faithful to one another and always mate with the same lizard, although 40 percent of males have been documented to mate with other females. The tunnels are mostly excavated by adults, while juvenile lizards contribute small "pop" holes to the system. DNA analysis has shown that immature lizards live in the same burrow with their siblings, regardless of age difference. The study, carried out in the Uluru-Kata Tjuta National Park, also revealed that all immature lizards were full siblings in 18 of 24 burrow systems. Researchers confirmed that the lizards are family-based and keep the juveniles in the tunnel system until they mature.

They hibernate in winter (May/mid-June to September/October).

== Diet ==
Tjakura is omnivorous and can be considered an opportunist generalist as it consumes a diverse range of invertebrates and plants supplemented at least occasionally with small vertebrate prey items. Culicidae (mosquitos) and Termitidae (termites) are the most frequently consumed. Tjakura actively forage both during the day and at night.

== Conservation status ==
The great desert skink, or tjakura, is a threatened species, listed as a vulnerable species under the federal EPBC Act, NT and WA legislation, and on the IUCN Red List. It is listed as endangered in South Australia. It used to be a source of food for desert-dwelling Aboriginal peoples inhabiting central Australia, but since the colonisation of Australia, introduced pests such as foxes and feral cats have decimated the population.

In March 2023, the first survey in a new National Recovery Plan for the great desert skink led by Indigenous rangers from across the Northern Territory, Western Australia, and South Australia was carried out. The rangers will continue to survey and collect data on the skink.
