= Giant spiny skink =

Conservation status
- Data Deficient (IUCN 3.1)

Scientific classification
- Kingdom: Animalia
- Phylum: Chordata
- Class: Reptilia
- Order: Squamata
- Family: Scincidae
- Genus: Tribolonotus
- Species: T. ponceleti

Binomial name
- Tribolonotus ponceleti Kinghorn, 1937

Species of lizard

The giant spiny skink or Poncelet's helmet skink (Tribolonotus ponceleti) is a species of lizard in the family Scincidae. The species is endemic to the Solomon Islands.

== Etymology ==
The specific name, ponceleti, is in honor of the Rev. Jean-Baptiste Poncelet (1884-1958), French missionary and naturalist.

== Habitat ==
The preferred habitat of T. ponceleti is forest at altitudes of 0–250 m (0–820 ft).

== Behavior ==
Unlike most skinks, T. ponceleti has the ability to vocalize.

== Reproduction ==
T. ponceleti is oviparous.
