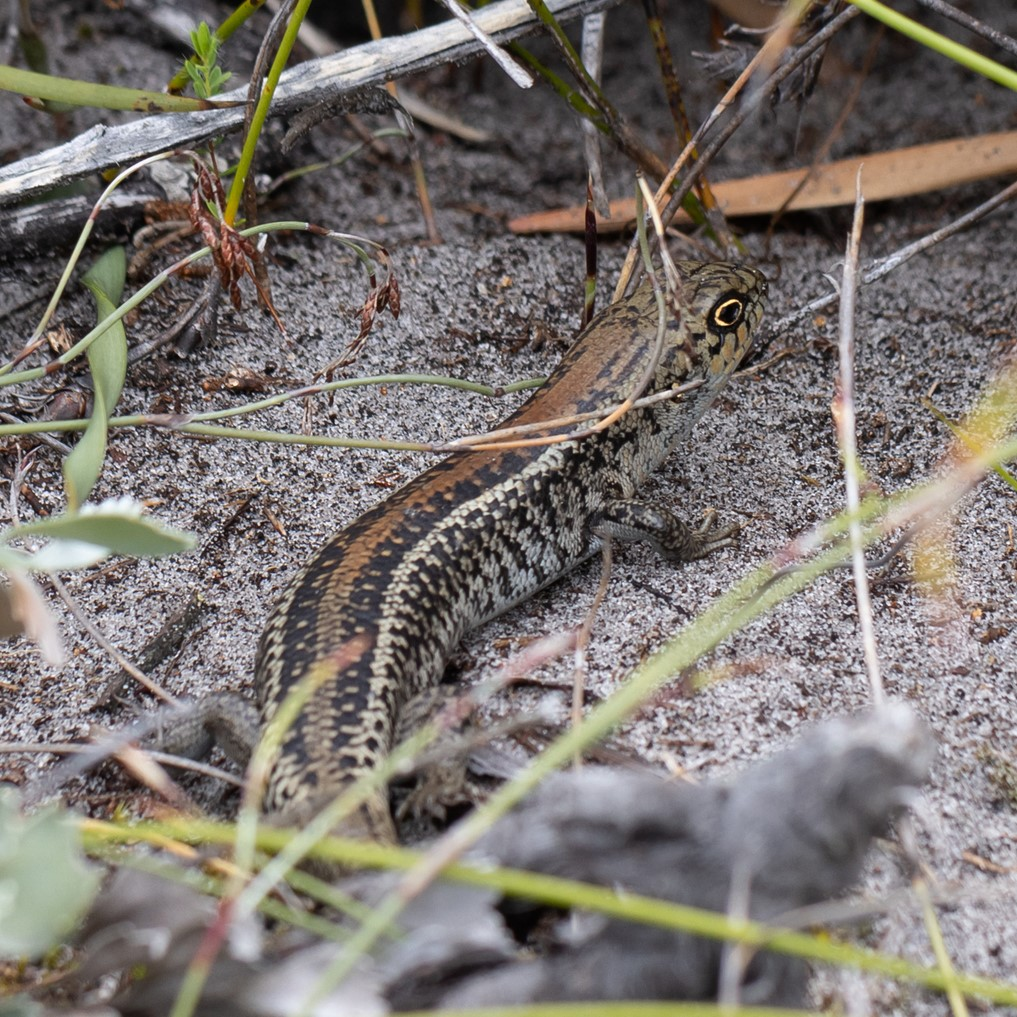

Conservation status
- Least Concern (IUCN 3.1)

Scientific classification
- Kingdom: Animalia
- Phylum: Chordata
- Class: Reptilia
- Order: Squamata
- Family: Scincidae
- Genus: Liopholis
- Species: L. pulchra

Binomial name
- Liopholis pulchra (Werner, 1910)

= Southwestern rock-skink =

Species of lizard

The southwestern rock-skink (Liopholis pulchra), also known as spectacled rock skink or Jurien Bay rock-skink, is a species of skink, in the family Scincidae. It is endemic to southwestern Australia.
