= Eastern Ranges rock-skink =

Conservation status
- Least Concern (IUCN 3.1)

Scientific classification
- Kingdom: Animalia
- Phylum: Chordata
- Class: Reptilia
- Order: Squamata
- Family: Scincidae
- Genus: Liopholis
- Species: L. modesta

Binomial name
- Liopholis modesta (Storr, 1968)

Species of lizard

The Eastern Ranges rock-skink (Liopholis modesta) is a species of skink, a lizard in the family Scincidae. The species is endemic to eastern Australia.
