= Admiralty spiny skink =

Conservation status
- Data Deficient (IUCN 3.1)

Scientific classification
- Kingdom: Animalia
- Phylum: Chordata
- Class: Reptilia
- Order: Squamata
- Family: Scincidae
- Genus: Tribolonotus
- Species: T. brongersmai

Binomial name
- Tribolonotus brongersmai Cogger, 1972

Species of lizard

The Admiralty spiny skink (Tribolonotus brongersmai), also known commonly as Brongersma's helmet skink, is a species of lizard in the family Scincidae. The species is endemic to the Admiralty Islands.

== Etymology ==
The specific name, brongersmai, is in honor of Dutch herpetologist Leo Brongersma.

== Habitat ==
The natural habitat of T. brongersmai is unknown. The holotype was collected on a copra plantation, beneath a pile of rotting coconut husks.

== Reproduction ==
T. brongersmai is oviparous.
