= Snowy Mountains skink =

Conservation status
- Endangered (IUCN 3.1)

Scientific classification
- Kingdom: Animalia
- Phylum: Chordata
- Class: Reptilia
- Order: Squamata
- Family: Scincidae
- Genus: Liopholis
- Species: L. guthega

Binomial name
- Liopholis guthega (Donnellan, Hutchinson, Dempsey & Osborne, 2002)

Species of lizard

The Snowy Mountains skink or guthega skink, alpine egernia (Liopholis guthega) is a species of skink, a lizard in the family Scincidae. The species is endemic to southeastern Australia.
