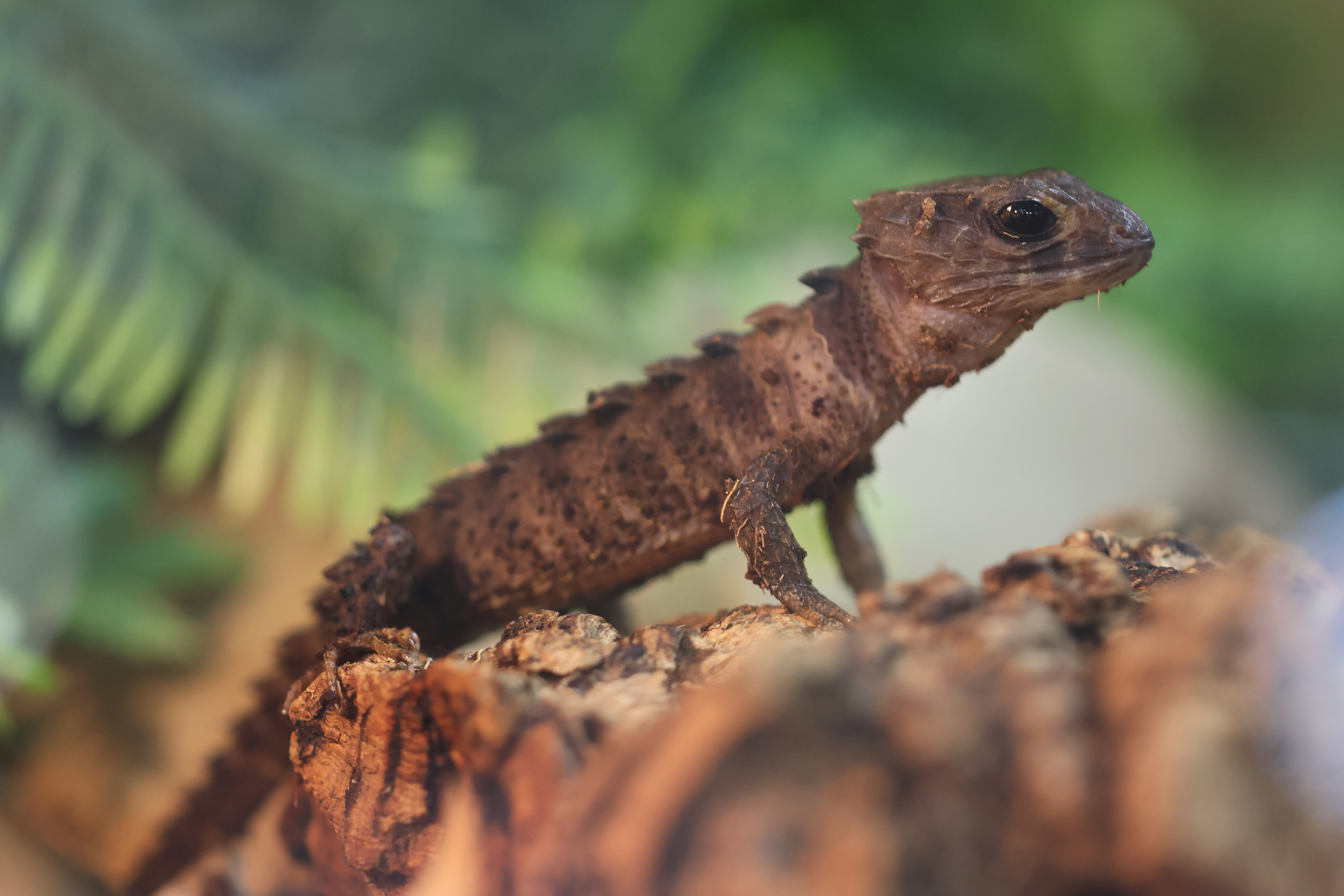

Conservation status
- Least Concern (IUCN 3.1)

Scientific classification
- Kingdom: Animalia
- Phylum: Chordata
- Class: Reptilia
- Order: Squamata
- Family: Scincidae
- Genus: Tribolonotus
- Species: T. novaeguineae

Binomial name
- Tribolonotus novaeguineae (Schlegel, 1834)

= White-eyed crocodile skink =

Species of lizard

The white-eyed crocodile skink (Tribolonotus novaeguineae) is a species of insectivorous lizard in the family Scincidae. The species is found in Irian Jaya and Papua New Guinea.
