= Schmidt's helmet skink =

Conservation status
- Least Concern (IUCN 3.1)

Scientific classification
- Kingdom: Animalia
- Phylum: Chordata
- Class: Reptilia
- Order: Squamata
- Family: Scincidae
- Genus: Tribolonotus
- Species: T. schmidti

Binomial name
- Tribolonotus schmidti Burt, 1930

Synonyms
- Tribolonotus schmidti Burt, 1930; Pediporus schmidti — Roux, 1930; Tribolonotus schmidti — Burt, 1932

Species of lizard

Schmidt's helmet skink (Tribolonotus schmidti), also known commonly as Schmidt's crocodile skink, is a species of lizard in the family Scincidae. The species is endemic to Guadalcanal in the Solomon Islands.

== Etymology ==
The specific name, schmidti, is in honor of American herpetologist Karl Patterson Schmidt.

== Habitat ==
The preferred natural habitat of T. schmidti is forest, at altitudes from sea level to 1,500 m (4,900 ft).

== Description ==
The holotype of T. schmidti has a snout-to-vent length (SVL) of 3.9 cm (1.5 in), and a total length (including tail) of 8.8 cm (3.5 in). It has two rows of enlarged plate-like dorsal scales running down the center of the back. Each row contains more than 20 scales from the back of the head to the beginning of the tail.

== Reproduction ==
T. schmidti is viviparous.
