= Liopholis personata =

Scientific classification
- Kingdom: Animalia
- Phylum: Chordata
- Class: Reptilia
- Order: Squamata
- Family: Scincidae
- Genus: Liopholis
- Species: L. personata

Binomial name
- Liopholis personata (Storr, 1968)

Species of lizard

Liopholis personata is a species of skink, a lizard in the family Scincidae. The species is endemic to southern Australia.
