= Tribolonotus parkeri =

Scientific classification
- Kingdom: Animalia
- Phylum: Chordata
- Class: Reptilia
- Order: Squamata
- Family: Scincidae
- Genus: Tribolonotus
- Species: T. parkeri

Binomial name
- Tribolonotus parkeri Rittmeyer & Austin, 2017

Species of lizard

Tribolonotus parkeri is a species of lizard in the family Scincidae. The species is endemic to Buka Island.
