= Slater's desert skink =

Conservation status
- Vulnerable (IUCN 3.1)

Scientific classification
- Kingdom: Animalia
- Phylum: Chordata
- Class: Reptilia
- Order: Squamata
- Family: Scincidae
- Genus: Liopholis
- Species: L. slateri

Binomial name
- Liopholis slateri (Storr, 1968)

Synonyms
- Egernia slateri Storr, 1968; Liopholis slateri — Gardner et al., 2008

Species of lizard

Slater's desert skink (Liopholis slateri), also known commonly as the Centralian Floodplains desert-skink, Slater's egernia, and Slater's skink, is a species of lizard in the family Scincidae. The species is endemic to Australia. There are two recognized subspecies.

== Etymology ==
The specific name, slateri, is in honour of Australian herpetologist Kenneth R. Slater.

== Geographic range ==
L. slateri is found in Northern Territory and Southern Australia in central Australia.

== Habitat ==
The preferred natural habitats of L. slateri are forest and shrubland.

== Reproduction ==
L. slateri is viviparous.

== Subspecies ==
Two subspecies are recognized as being valid including the nominotypical subspecies.

- Liopholis slateri slateri (Storr, 1968) – southern Northern Territory
- Liopholis slateri virgata (Storr, 1968) – northern South Australia

Nota bene: A trinomial authority in parentheses indicates that the subspecies was originally described in a genus other than Liopholis.
