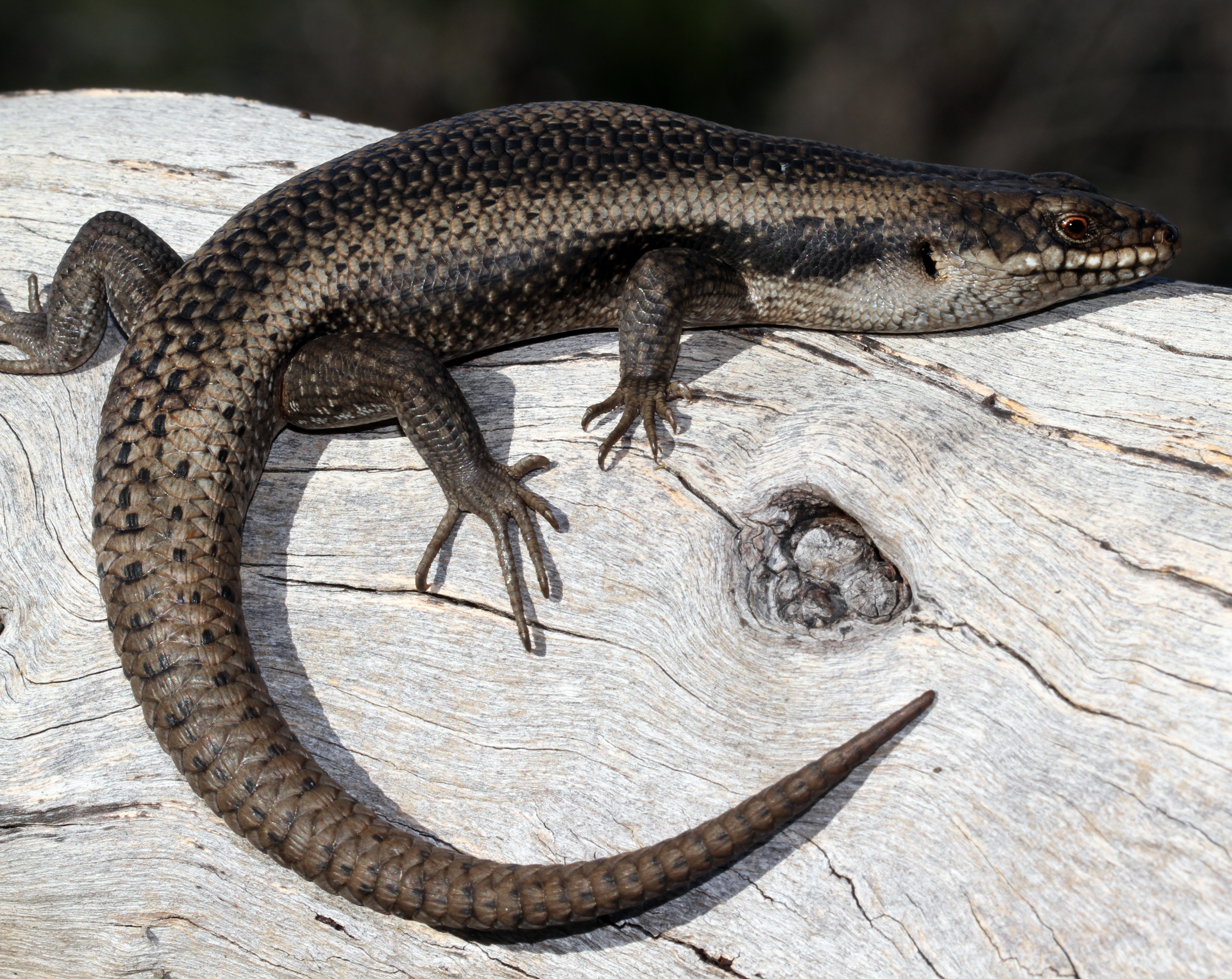

Conservation status
- Least Concern (IUCN 3.1)

Scientific classification
- Kingdom: Animalia
- Phylum: Chordata
- Class: Reptilia
- Order: Squamata
- Family: Scincidae
- Genus: Egernia
- Species: E. striolata

Binomial name
- Egernia striolata (Peters, 1870)

Synonyms
- Tropidolepisma striolatum Peters, 1870; Tropidolepisma dorsale Peters, 1874

= Tree-crevice skink =

Species of lizard

The tree-crevice skink or tree skink (Egernia striolata) is a species of skink, a lizard in the family Scincidae. The species is endemic to Australia and is found in the states of Victoria, the Northern Territory, Queensland, New South Wales and South Australia. E. striolata tend to live in crevices and cracks in hollow logs or rocks. They greatly prefer heterogeneous and structurally diverse habitats and their behavior changes depending on the habitat they live in.

They are moderately large lizards of the genus Egernia and are generally colored dark-black to grey-brown with a pale stripe going from their head to their tail. They grow to be around 100–118 mm long and can live for up to ten years. Their primary diet consists of larger, hard-bodied insects. Snakes, birds, and mammals are their major predators.

They are well known for their complex social interactions and their ability to flexibly adjust their behavior depending on environmental factors. They generally live in small nuclear family groups of 2-10 individuals, made up of parents and their offspring. Offspring stay with their parents in these units until they fully mature, after which they will disperse. They mate monogamously and can live with up to several generations of their offspring at a time. The unique ability of E. striolata to chemically identify their kin and quickly react to novel social situations allows them to live in multi-generational family units. They almost always prefer to live in groups over individually. Even when there are multiple unoccupied habitats well-suited to an individual's needs, E. striolata still opts to live in groups over living alone. E. striolata are highly territorial and mark their territory using scat. E. striolata acts more aggressively or cautiously around individuals that are not identified to be family members.

== Description ==
The tree-crevice skink is a moderate-to-large, deep-headed species of the genus Egernia. Its coloration ranges from dark black to gray-brown and has a pale dorso-lateral stripe that runs from the head to the base of the tail. Sometimes they present scattered with white spots and flecks on the torso. Ventral surfaces are often lemon-yellow or pale orange whereas ventral surfaces of limbs and tail are whitish or grey. A dark lateral band runs from the eye to the groin, which has pale scales that form transverse bars.

Their labial scales are white or cream. E. striolata has vertically narrow pupils and white auricular lobules. E. striolata can be distinguished from E. kintorei on the basis of the former having fewer labials and more pointed ear lobules. The nasals of E. striolata are moderately separately and rarely narrowed. The head scales have narrow and brown or dark margins and occasionally, white spots

== Taxonomy ==
The genus Egernia is endemic to Australia and has 30 species. These species are diurnal, moderate-to-large lizards with well-developed and pentadactyl limbs that inhabit rocky environments. All members of Egernia are viviparous.

Members of genus Egernia have moderately-sized heads. Tails of Egernia members are thick and tapering. They have divided nasal scales. The lower eyelid is moveable and does not have a transparent or pale cream margins. They have an unpigmented tongue.

The Kaputar Rock Skink species was believed to have been Egernia striolata until a 2019 study discovered they had a distinct genetic lineage.

== Habitat and distribution ==
The tree-crevice skink is a native species from Australia, found from the arid zone of Western Australia from the Pilbara and the Great Sandy Desert south to Carnarvon and the Great Victoria Desert

It is not present on the coast and higher altitudes of the Great Dividing Range and on central and eastern Queensland and extra limits in southern Northern Territory and northwestern South Australia.

The tree skink is largely an arboreal (tree-dwelling) species that can be found in hollow logs and cracks, as well as behind the bark of standing and fallen trees. In NSW, E. striolata are rarely found to dwell in rocks, though this is not the case in the entirety of their range. In South Australia, they frequently use rocks, tree crevices and exfoliating slabs. They have been found under the 'skirts' of Xanthorrhoea spp. This species can also be found in habitats impacted or developed by humans, such as in fence poles.

E. striolata strongly prefer to live in heterogeneous environments that are structurally diverse. E. striolata are much more abundant in habitats with greater diversity in crevices and rock sizes. Immature lizards may dwell in smaller rocks with fewer crevices due to competition over more complex habitats. Because tree skinks are heliothermic, they prefer to dwell in sites that are elevated such that they have access to more solar radiation. More solar radiation improves their fitness and allow them to better defend, forage, and develop stable social groups. E. striolata exhibits different levels of sociability based on the habitat that they occupy. For example, in northern New South Wales, E. striolata commonly live in tree stumps and are less frequently found in groups compared to South Australia, where they are mostly rock dwellers.

=== Home range and territoriality ===
Members of Egernia typically have strong attachments to a home site. E. striolata are highly territorial and have a tendency to defecate in or by their home site, creating scat piles to mark their territory. They are able to distinguish between scat of kin and unknown scats, most likely to help them identify territory. Very large piles of scat that accumulate near the entrance of their home sites can be used to signify the presence of an aggregation of individuals at that location. These large scat piles may risk advertising their existence to potential predators, but such piles continue to be made regardless, so these piles seem to serve some important function. Some other species of Egernia that do not have as complex social interactions do not possess the ability to discern between scats of various groups, which suggests that large scat piles are used as a means to mark territory for social purposes.

== Diet ==
E. striolata are omnivorous, with their primary food sources consisting of larger, hard-bodied insects such as coleopterans, ants, grasshoppers, and cockroaches. However, plant matter does constitute a significant part of their diet, which is estimated to be at 39.7%.

== Reproduction and life cycle ==
Their mating season occurs in September and October. Egernia striolata are viviparous and have relatively simple type 1 placentas, but not a lot of research has been done on their exact reproductive ecology. They prefer to mate monogamously and keep one mate for at least the entirety of a breeding season. They produce 2-6 offspring per litter. After giving birth, they tend to form nuclear families with the parents and offspring and may live together with up to several generations of offspring. This means it is common for aggregations to form, consisting of a breeding pair of parents and a variety of juveniles and subadults of varying ages. This provides the children with protection from predators and infanticide.

Female E. striolata have the ability to produce offspring without having recently mated. It was shown that they can produce children even with no access to any mates for over a year. This is achieved through their ability to store sperm from males after mating and allows them to reproduce at a later date even if they are under challenging ecological scenarios. This also demonstrates that in the event of a sexual conflict, female tree crevice skinks have the upper hand. Additionally, the capability to store sperm allows them to avoid inbreeding by giving females the ability to selectively control which sperm they use.

E. striolata are 47–55 mm when born and grow to 100–118 mm once they fully mature. After being born, juveniles will generally live with their parents in family units until they are fully grown and then they disperse, which can take up to 5 years. However, it usually takes them 2–3 years to fully mature and they live up to 10 years.

== Behavior ==
=== Behavioral flexibility ===
Egernia striolata are well known for their complex social interactions, especially among lizards. One of the reasons they are able to form such complex associations is because they are very good at adapting their behavior and applying existing skills to fit novel situations. This allows them to be flexible with their behavior and react to changes in their environment. A study in 2018 interrogated the learning behavior of tree-crevice skinks. The study team tested and taught E. striolata to discriminate between pairs of shapes and colors. They then reversed the test to see how well they could adapt to the new stimuli. The lizards appeared to learn the new part of the test as a completely separate section and were able to quickly discard their previously learned associations. Their ability to learn new answers and discard initial answers easily demonstrates their behavioral flexibility, a valuable trait in coping with environmental or social problems.

In an attempt to better understand inhibitory control in lizards, E. striolata were analyzed through results in a cylinder test, a test to examine inhibitory control by seeing how something reacts to a reward placed in a transparent cylinder, in order to examine their behavior. E. striolata demonstrated the ability to learn from the experiments and exhibit inhibitory control over their actions in order to not instinctively approach the reward instantly, but instead reach through the side openings instead. This helps us better understand the development and evolution of different cognitive abilities in lizards and how some lizards are capable of learning from past behaviors and exhibiting more complex behaviors. However, although they demonstrated an ability to learn and show restraint in their actions, among the lizard families tested, E. striolata was among the lowest success rates of the experiment and had the highest experiment drop out rate. This result may be because they simply have lower inhibitory control potential than other lizard families but also may be because they live in small nuclear families and these ecological and social differences between the species may have been affecting their behaviors. In general, more social species of lizards had lower success rates in the experiment which is a result that contradicts the "Social Intelligence Hypothesis" and what would be expected of most species.

=== Competition ===
When population density is very high, E. striolata compete over territory and resources, increasing their aggressive behavior. E. striolata may display aggression by biting or nipping their opponent. The consequent social disruption impacts their typically observed behaviors. For example, they spend less time basking in the sun as pairs. Extended social instability and aggressive behaviors have negative consequences on the fitness of individuals. Exploratory behavior is also affected by shelter density. Males at lower shelter densities increase their exploratory behaviors. E. striolata also shelter as pairs more frequently at lower shelter densities.

=== Social behavior ===
Egernia striolata tend to aggregate socially, in small groups of 2 to 4 individuals.

There is a large amount of variation in group size and social behavior in Egernia striolata and they have been found to be capable of changing their social behavior situationally depending on their current environment. In a 2018 study, newborn lizards were taken and raised in either isolated environments (alone) or social environments (two unrelated lizards together) and then all were released into a semi-natural environment after 1.5 years. The study found that tree-crevice skinks raised in isolation started off with more social behavior than those raised socially, but over time they became less social while lizards raised socially were consistent in their social behavior over long periods of time. Isolated skinks also showed more homogeneity in their social associations, demonstrating they were more naive and more likely to associate with unfamiliar individuals. This demonstrated that E. striolata have different social behaviors depending on their experience and upbringing. E. striolata possess the ability to respond to variable social contexts by changing their social behavior. However, regardless of upbringing, their E. striolata behavior still showed a great deal of plasticity and flexibility when adapting to changing environments.

E. striolata are very social, even when there is an excess of ideal shelters available, they will still opt to live in pairs or groups. This is likely because of factors such as pressure from predators and thermoregulatory or other physiological effects. When there are very few shelters available, tree skinks exhibit increased stress related behaviors, such as tongue flicking and exploring.

=== Kin recognition ===
E. striolata have a kin recognition system not found in any other member of the Egernia genus.

Egernia striolata have the ability to distinguish their kin and discriminate between individuals based on degrees of relatedness. The exact method of their kin identification is unclear, but it is most likely based on chemical cues. A study demonstrated that juveniles were able to discriminate between scat from their family and scat from an unfamiliar source. However, they were able to discriminate between skin secretions deposited onto paper even better than scat, so there is evidence pointing towards skin secretions being the primary method of recognition. This unique ability plays an important role in their social behavior as it allows them to maintain stable, long lasting family relationships. This may relate to why tree-crevice skinks tend to form long lasting social groups with parents and offspring together. This also helps them avoid inbreeding as they are able to recognize who their family members are.

E. striolata are able to quickly use their knowledge and adjust to reapply it to novel situations. They use their ability to distinguish between related and unrelated individuals in order to alter their behavior. They are usually more cautious or aggressive towards individuals who they do not recognize as part of their group.

== Predators ==
A wide range of organisms have been found to hunt E. striolata as prey, with the most common predators being birds, snakes, and mammals. E. striolata have been observed hiding in their crevices or under bark where they cannot be reached in order to escape predators, but foxes and cats have been seen waiting nearby for them to leave in order to catch them.

A number of parasites have been known to seek E. striolata as hosts, such as Plasmodium mackerrasae.

== Captive care ==
These lizards can be taken in as pets and knowing what to do can be difficult.

The enclosure that they are kept in should be large enough that they can move anywhere with ease, a common housing space can be 28in x 24in x 24in. This includes habitat specific substrates and other enrichments for the lizards

Feeding in captive care can be changed depending on what the lizards enjoy eating. They can eat the live crickets, mealworms, and other insects, but also giving them soft based foods like flavored baby food works just as well. Using peach, sweet potato, turkey, chicken, and lamb baby foods allows for these lizards to get a healthy amount of vitamins and minerals.

Lighting is very important and having both a heat lamp and a normal lamp is crucial to welfare.

== Conservation status ==
Egernia striolata is listed as "Least Concern" in the IUCN Red List with a currently stable population. It has no specific conservation actions.
