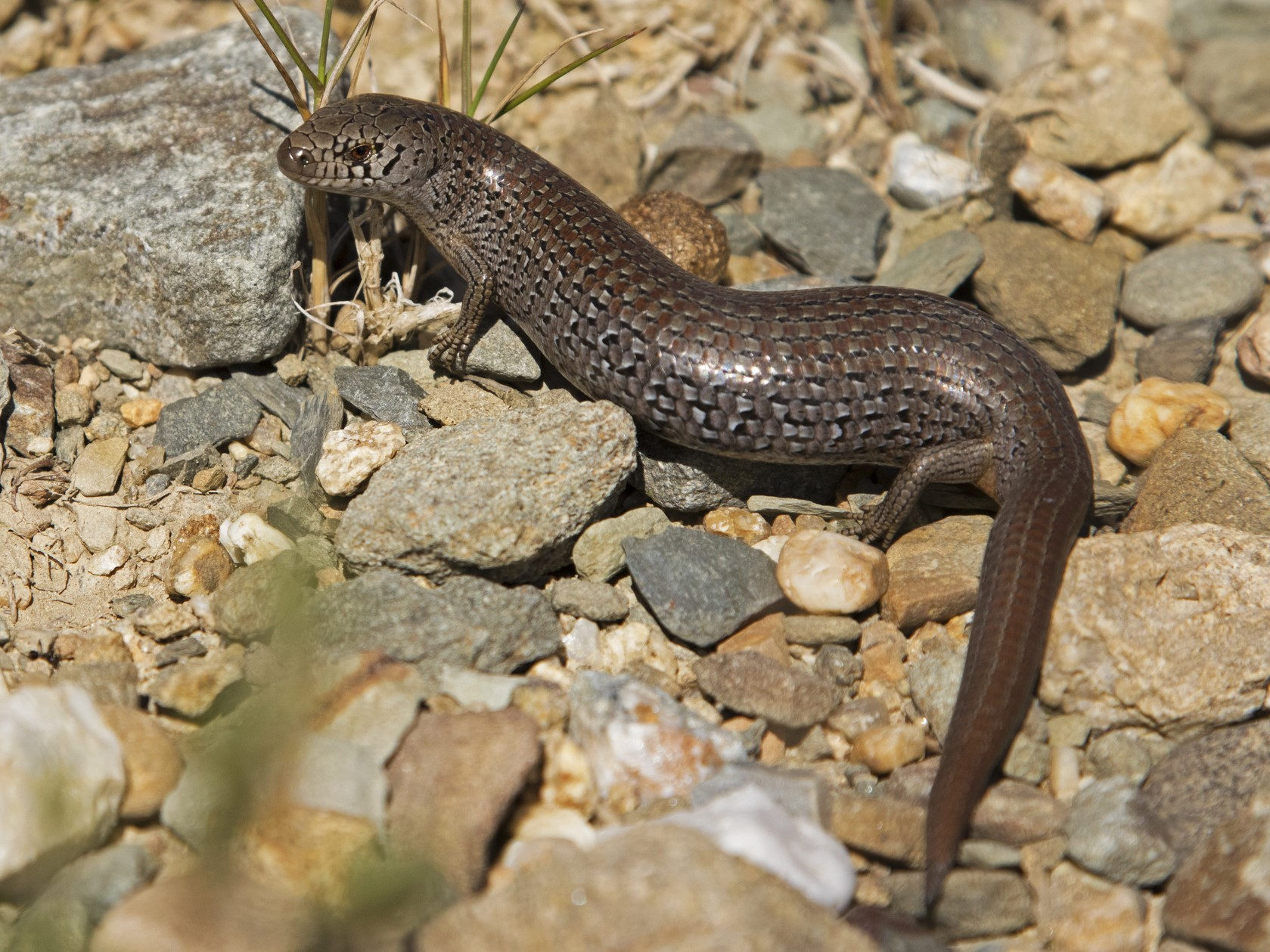

Conservation status
- Endangered (IUCN 3.1)

- Endangered (EPBC Act)

Scientific classification
- Kingdom: Animalia
- Phylum: Chordata
- Class: Reptilia
- Order: Squamata
- Family: Scincidae
- Genus: Cyclodomorphus
- Species: C. praealtus

Binomial name
- Cyclodomorphus praealtus Shea, 1995

= Alpine she-oak skink =

Species of lizard

The alpine she-oak skink (Cyclodomorphus praealtus) also known as the alpine she-oak slender bluetongue is an endangered species of lizard in the family Scincidae and is endemic to the Australian Alps.

== Taxonomy ==
This species was first scientifically described in 1995 by Australian herpetologist Glenn Michael Shea from the holotype collected at Three Mile Dam in Kiandra by W.A. Rawlinson in 1967. The species name praealtus derives from Latin prae- (meaning very) and altus (meaning high) referring to the high altitudes of the species' distribution.

== Description ==
The alpine she-oak skink is a medium-sized lizard with a maximum body length of 116 millimetres (4.6 in) from snout to vent (excluding the tail.)

== Conservation ==
The alpine she-oak skink is listed as 'Endangered' on the IUCN Red List of Threatened Species, the Environment Protection and Biodiversity Conservation Act 1999 (EPBC Act) and the Biodiversity Conservation Act 2016 of New South Wales and as 'critically endangered' on the Flora and Fauna Guarantee Act 1988 of Victoria.

This species faces multiple threats related to degradation and destruction of its habitat, invasive species, bushfire and climate change.
