= Flinder's Ranges rock-skink =

Conservation status
- Least Concern (IUCN 3.1)

Scientific classification
- Kingdom: Animalia
- Phylum: Chordata
- Class: Reptilia
- Order: Squamata
- Family: Scincidae
- Genus: Liopholis
- Species: L. margaretae

Binomial name
- Liopholis margaretae (Storr, 1968)

Synonyms
- Egernia margaretae Storr, 1968

Species of lizard

The Flinder's Ranges rock-skink (Liopholis margaretae), also known commonly as the Centralian Ranges rock-skink and the rock egernia, is a species of lizard in the subfamily Egerniinae of the family Scincidae (skinks). The species is endemic to central Australia.

== Etymology ==
The specific name, margaretae, is in honour of Margaret Anne Slater, wife of K.R. Slater. K.R. Slater donated the holotype to the Western Australian Museum.

== Description ==
Liopholis margaretae may attain a snout-to-vent length (SVL) of 11.5 cm (4.5 in).

== Geographic range ==
Within Australia, Liopholis margaretae is found in the state of South Australia and the adjacent territory of Northern Territory.

== Habitat ==
The preferred natural habitat of Liopholis margaretae is rocky areas.

== Behaviour ==
Liopholis margaretae is diurnal, terrestrial, and saxicolous (rock-dwelling).

== Reproduction ==
Liopholis margaretae is ovoviviparous.
