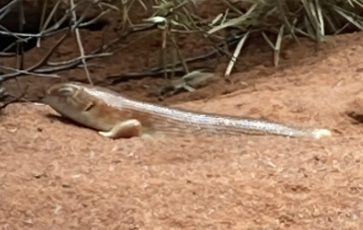

Conservation status
- Least Concern (IUCN 3.1)

Scientific classification
- Kingdom: Animalia
- Phylum: Chordata
- Class: Reptilia
- Order: Squamata
- Family: Scincidae
- Genus: Liopholis
- Species: L. striata

Binomial name
- Liopholis striata (Sternfeld, 1919)
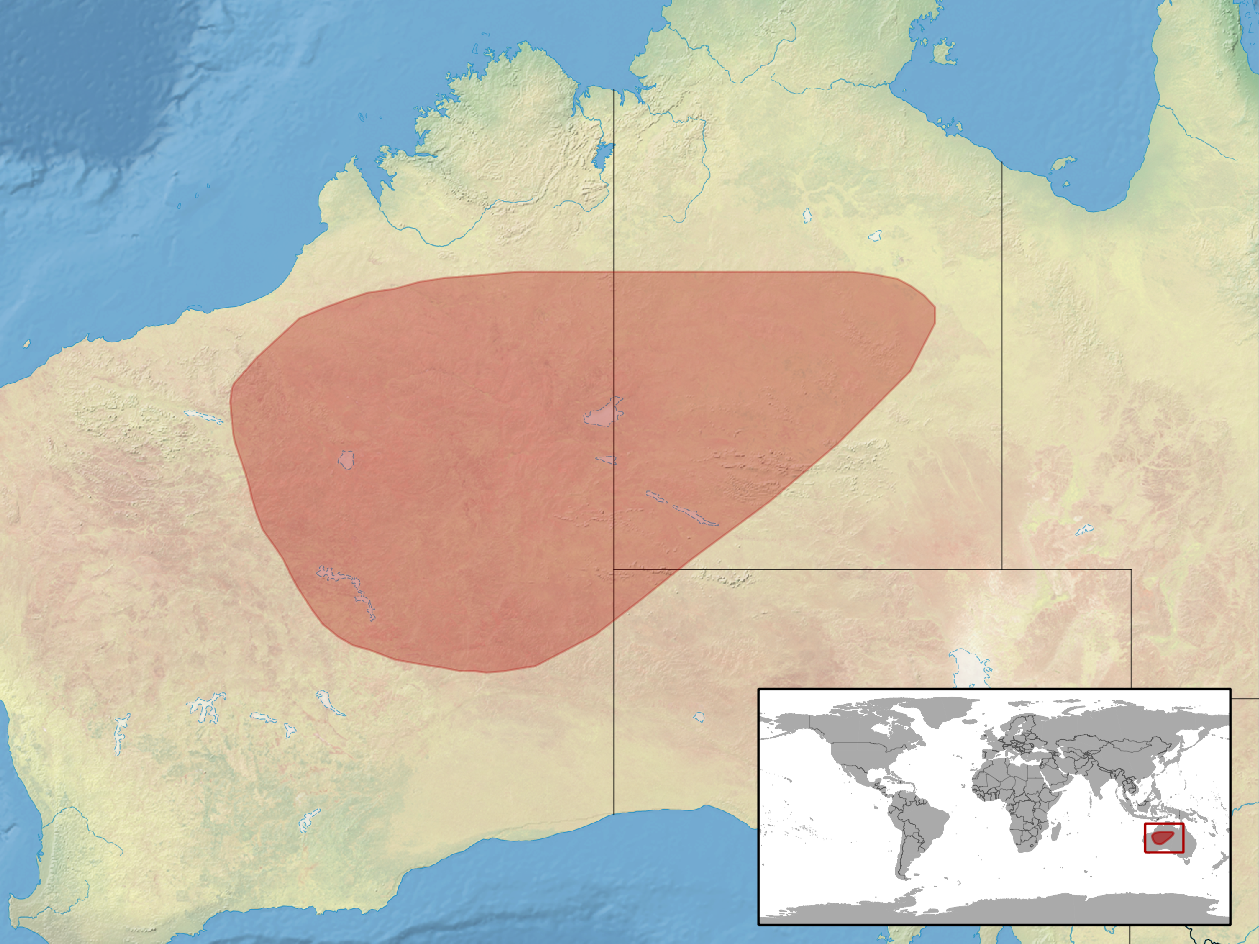

= Night skink =

Species of lizard

The night skink, nocturnal desert-skink or striated egernia (Liopholis striata) is a species of skink, a lizard in the family Scincidae. The species is endemic to western Australia.
