= Bull skink =

Conservation status
- Critically Endangered (IUCN 3.1)

Scientific classification
- Kingdom: Animalia
- Phylum: Chordata
- Class: Reptilia
- Order: Squamata
- Family: Scincidae
- Genus: Liopholis
- Species: L. multiscutata

Binomial name
- Liopholis multiscutata (Mitchell & Behrndt, 1949) (Department of Sustainability & Environment, 2013)

Species of lizard

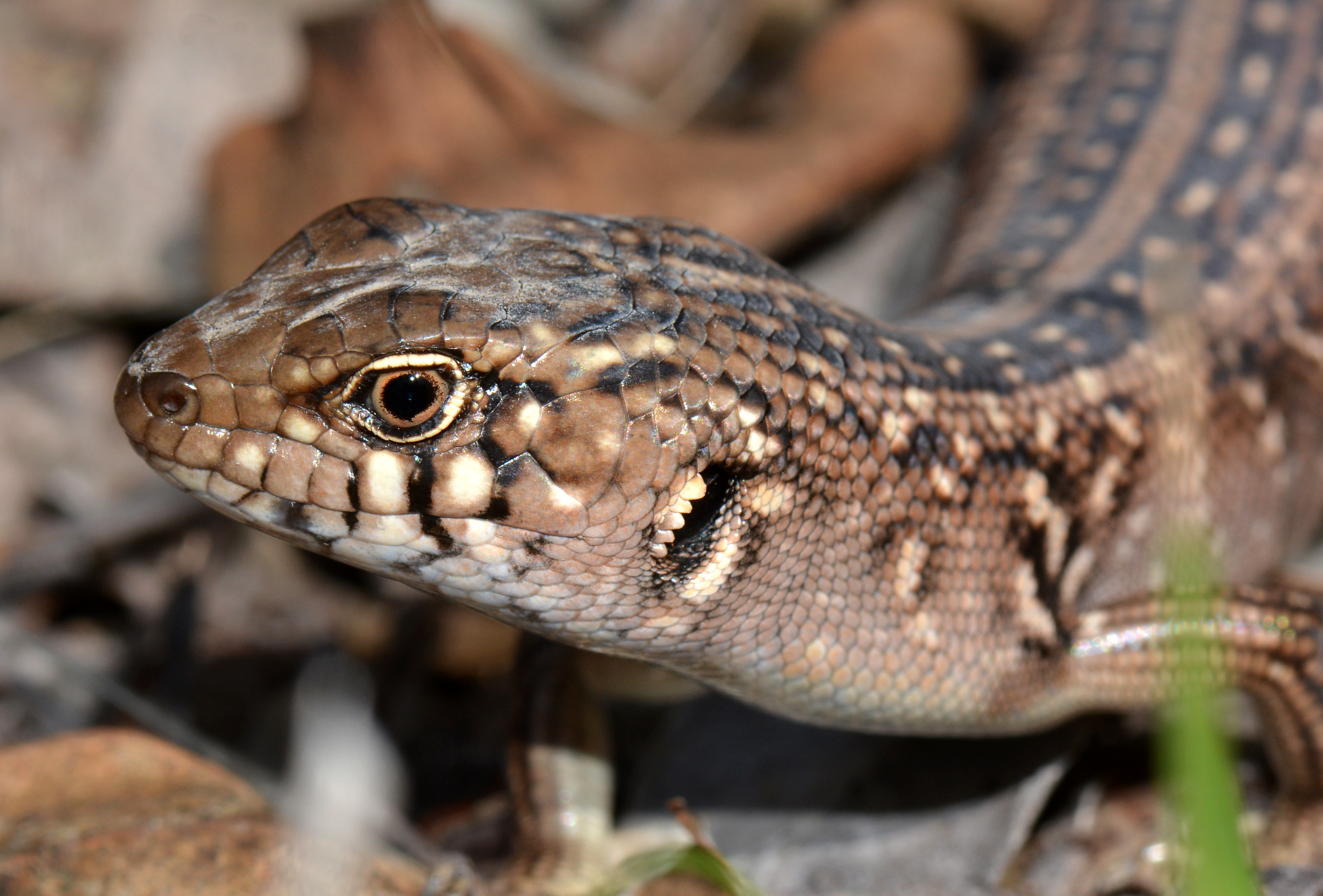
Liopholis multiscutata. Found under an old sheet of corrugated iron by nature enthusiast Tony Rouphael.

The bull skink, southern sand-skink or southern heath skink (Liopholis multiscutata) is a species of terrestrial skink, a lizard in the family Scincidae. It is one of eleven species within the Liopholis genus.

== Description ==
The southern heath (bull) skink is characterised by its robust build, dorsal scales, and its coloration which varies from sandy to reddish-brown. It is a medium-sized skink with adults reaching a snout-vent length of 80-95mm.

The species displays sexual dimorphism, with males generally larger and more colourful than females. Liopholis multiscutata resembles Liopholis whitii but can be differentiated based on several characteristics. Specifically, the interparietal scale on the top of the head is as wide as, or wider than, the frontal scale, even in mature specimens. The subdigital lamellae, or scales under the toes, have a bicarinate (two-ridged) texture. Additionally, this species has two or three rows of small white or yellow spots within the dark dorso-lateral stripe along its back. Unlike in Liopholis whitii, the flanks exhibit ambiguous pale and dark scales, seldom forming distinct ocelli (eye-like markings). The animal has 37–46 smooth scale rows at mid-body and a snout-vent length of 80 mm.

== Taxonomy ==
This taxa was named by Francis John Mitchell in 1949 and was formerly of the genus Egernia. Research has been conducted on the classification of the Egernia group of skinks from the Australian region, including the heath skink. Various studies have used molecular methods to identify different species and major lineages within this group, recognising 11 species within the genus Liopholis. The heath skink shares ecological traits with arid-adapted species in the group, L. inornata, L. slateri, L. striata, L. kintorei.

Geographically, the heath skink population in Victoria is closely related to those in South Australia. However, there are notable differences in habitat between these populations, leading to potential genetic variation. This has resulted in the heath skink being listed as Critically Endangered in Victoria. Despite these insights, the taxonomic status of the Victorian heath skink population is still unclear. This poses challenges for management and evolutionary studies, as many reptile lineages with low dispersal capacities remain undetected.

== Distribution ==
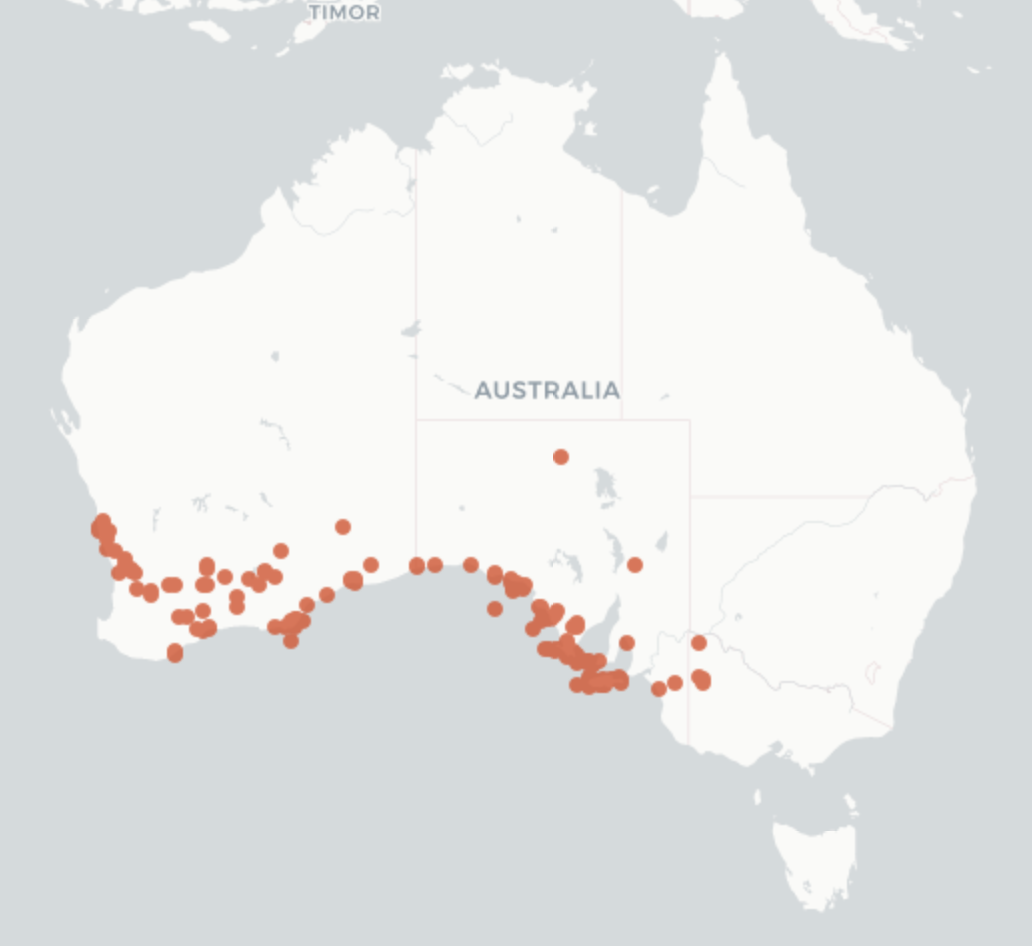
Distribution of Liopholis multiscutata in Australia

The species is endemic to southern Australia, Western Victoria, Kangaroo Island, and the Eyre and Yorke Peninsulas in South Australia extending to the coastal areas of southern Western Australia, encompassing numerous offshore islands. It is restricted to four small and highly disjunct populations in semiarid mallee dunefields in Victoria.

== Ecology and habitat ==
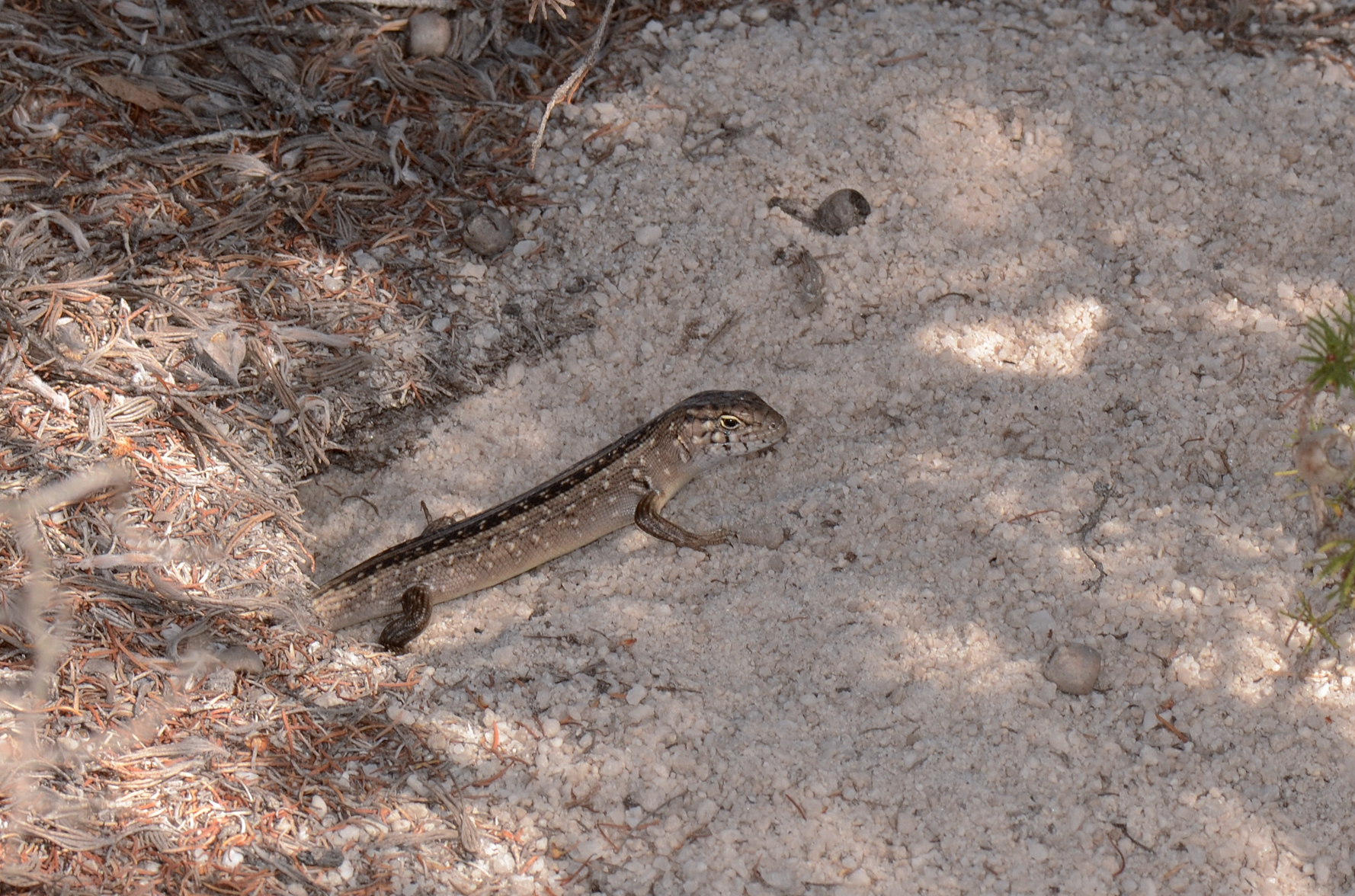
Bull Skink

The heath skink's habitat predominantly consists of open forest and low open woodlands, often featuring rock outcrops, as well as coastal dunes and heathlands. Exhibiting cryptic behaviour, it is specialised for burrowing, particularly in sandy or loamy soil types. The animal creates intricate tunnel networks, referred to as warrens, in and around large sand dune crests. These warrens, which often feature multiple entrances, are consistent with those of other species in the same genus and are usually situated at the base of small to medium-sized shrubs.

In Victoria, all known heath skink populations occur in the Lowan Mallee bioregion, furthermore they are found within the Mallee Health Ecological Vegetation Class (EVC) which is characterised by low open scrubland with heathy shrubs that are dominated by Banksia ornata (desert banksia), Leptospermum myrsinoides (heath tea tree) and Callitris verrocusa (scrub cypress pine).

== Life history ==
There is limited research on the life history of the heath skink; however, it is a viviparous skink that produces between 1-3 live young each year in mid to late summer. L. multiscutata is relatively slow to mature. The species has low dispersal ability and its lifespan is currently unknown, however, comparisons can be made with ecologically similar species L. whitii which has a life span of at least 8.5 years.

== Behaviour and diet ==
The heath skink exhibits ambush predation behaviour and primarily consumes a variety of invertebrates, most notably ants, beetles, and spiders, along with a limited intake of plant matter. Obeservations of closely related species indicate the heath skink is likely an opportunistic predator, consuming a wide array of insects, arachnids and crustaceans.

== Threats ==
Its slow rate of maturation, reproduction and its sit-and-wait predatory style make heath skink vulnerable to stochastic events such as fire, as it does not have the capacity to increase foraging time in a resource depleted landscape.

The impact of human-mediated climate change has been predicated to increase the severity, intensity and frequency of wildfires in southern Australia with more hot days and decreased rainfall. The consequence of this for the heath skink will be habitat loss and direct mortality from fires, however this is mediated through the burrowing capacity of the L. multiscutata.

== Conservation ==
The heath skink is listed as Critically endangered in Victoria under, 3.1.3(b)(i) of the Flora and Fauna Guarantee Regulations 2020. This status is in part due to its restricted range within Victoria. No current conservation actions are in place for this species
