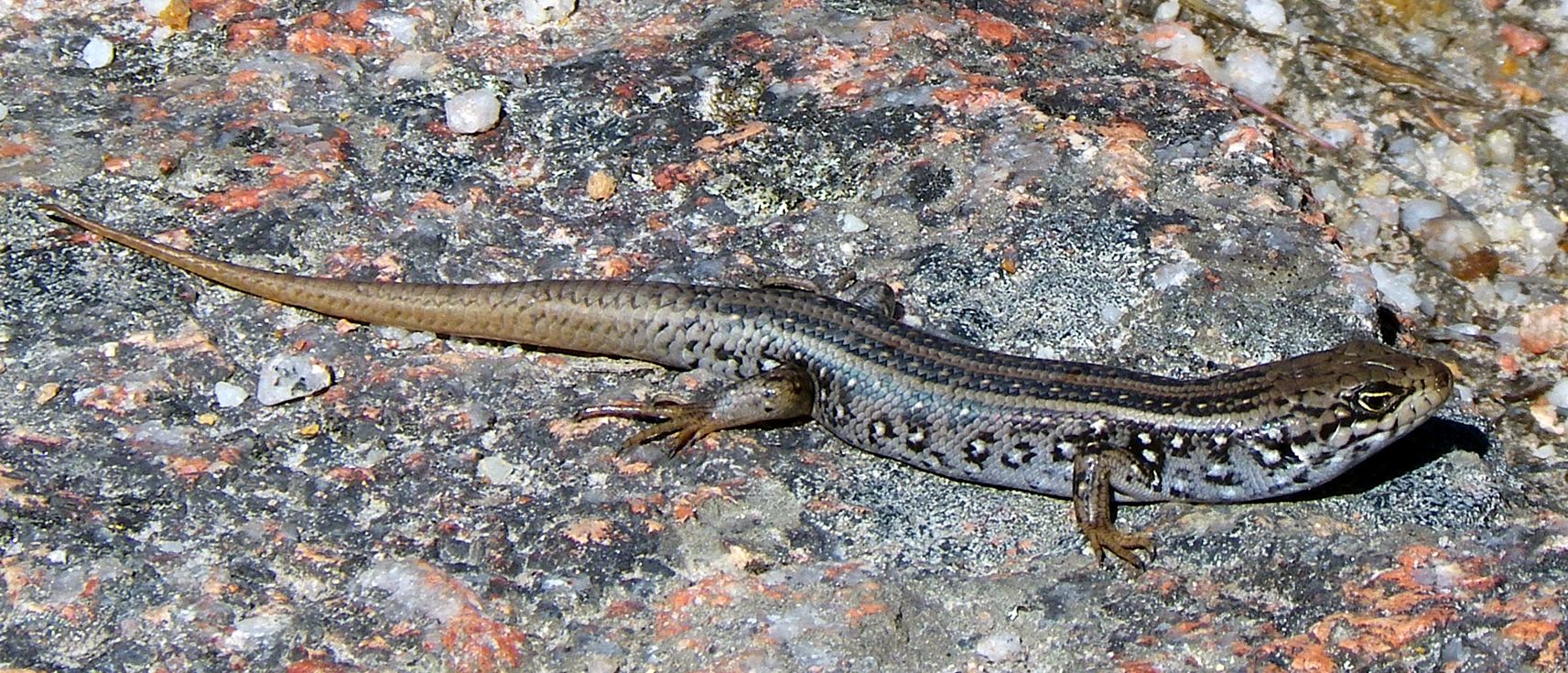

Conservation status
- Least Concern (IUCN 3.1)

Scientific classification
- Kingdom: Animalia
- Phylum: Chordata
- Class: Reptilia
- Order: Squamata
- Family: Scincidae
- Genus: Liopholis
- Species: L. whitii

Binomial name
- Liopholis whitii (Lacépède, 1804)
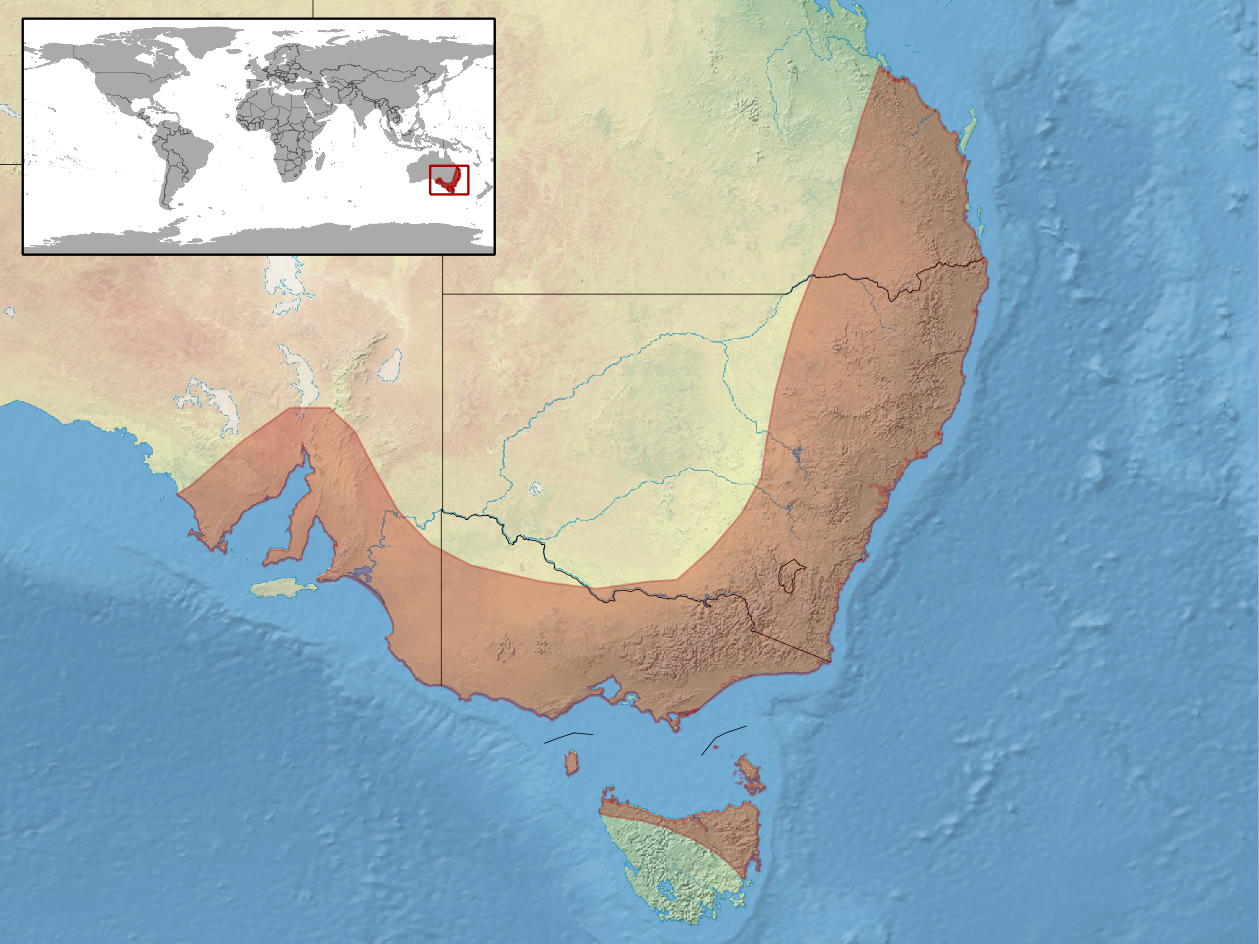

Synonyms
- Scincus whitii Lacépède, 1804; Lygosoma moniligera A.M.C. Duméril & Bibron, 1839; Liopholis moniligera — Fitzinger, 1843; Hinulia whitii — Gray, 1845; Egernia whitii — Boulenger, 1887; Liopholis whitii — Gardner et al., 2008

= White's skink =

Species of lizard

White's skink (Liopholis whitii), also known commonly as White's rock skink, is a species of lizard in the skink family. It was first described in 1804 by French naturalist Bernard Germain de Lacépède. It is endemic to Australia.

== Systematics ==
=== Taxonomy ===
L. whitii is highly variable and may be a complex of closely related species The specific name, whitii, honours Irish surgeon and naturalist John White.

=== Subspecies ===
Two subspecies are recognized as being valid, including the nominotypical subspecies.

- Liopholis whitii moniligera (A.M.C. Duméril & Bibron, 1839)
- Liopholis whitii whitii (Lacèpėde, 1804)

== Distribution and habitat ==
L. whitii is widespread in south-eastern Australia, including Tasmania and many Bass Strait islands. Natural habitats of the species include forest, shrubland, and rocky areas, at altitudes from sea level to 1,200 m (3,900 ft). The preferred habitat has rocks and shrubby heathland with minimal environmental disturbance.

== Description ==
White's skink is a stocky, slow-growing, medium-sized species, reaching a maximum snout-to-vent length (SVL) of about 90 mm (3.5 in). Both sexes are mature at ~75 mm (3.0 in) (SVL), a size typically achieved at three years, but which may be earlier in captivity.

The skinks are variable in colour and pattern. Some populations lack back patterns or lip stripes. Base colours of the central stripe range from grey to brown and red. The sides of their body are patterned with black and white rosettes on a grey to brown background. The underbelly is a pale peachy-orange, increasing in colour intensity towards the tail and on the undersides of the limbs.

The back is patterned with three bars, the middle being solid brown, parallelled on either side by black bars with white spots in a sequence that terminates at the base of the head and tail. The head and tail are typically brown with no patterning and minimal scale outlining present. Most specimens have black stripes on both sides of their lips that run from their yellow-lined eyes to a random speckling on the bottom of the chin. Individuals have varying lip patterns, with some having none.

== Behaviour ==
L. whitii is a burrowing polygynous (one male per group of females) species, often digging or reusing complex tunnels with multiple entrances to provide an escape route. The entrances are well concealed to avoid predators..

It is a highly aggressive species that will attack other individuals that they do not recognize or 'like' via scent. This includes outside females that the group could potentially include, making them very difficult to pair. Adults also will sometimes cannibalise rival juveniles they do not recognise, including tails.

In a natural population of White’s skink, it was shown that both females and males can discern the difference between unrelated and related individuals, and that both sexes tend to associate more frequently with members of the opposite sex who are related.

=== Feeding ===
Whites' skinks are omnivorous, capable of eating meat, insects and plant matter. They will also occasionally eat strawberries and raspberries.

=== Breeding ===
The skinks live in small, sometimes temporary, family groups, with up to five females per male. However, the females do sometimes mate with males outside the group. They are viviparous and give birth to live young. Females mate in September–October and give birth in late January–February over a period of two to ten days. Litter size ranges from 1–4.

Most research on breeding preference emphasises the avoidance of mating partners who are closely related, because inbreeding ordinarily decreases the quality of offspring. An investigation of a natural population of White’s skink, however, demonstrated that the optimal strategy may not always be avoidance of inbreeding, and that it may be beneficial under certain conditions.

The offspring are highly aggressive from birth and will fight amongst themselves to chase away their rival neonates from the group. Juveniles stay within the protection of their family until they reach about half the size of an adult. At this stage, the adult will chase the juvenile out of the group by attacking it on sight.
