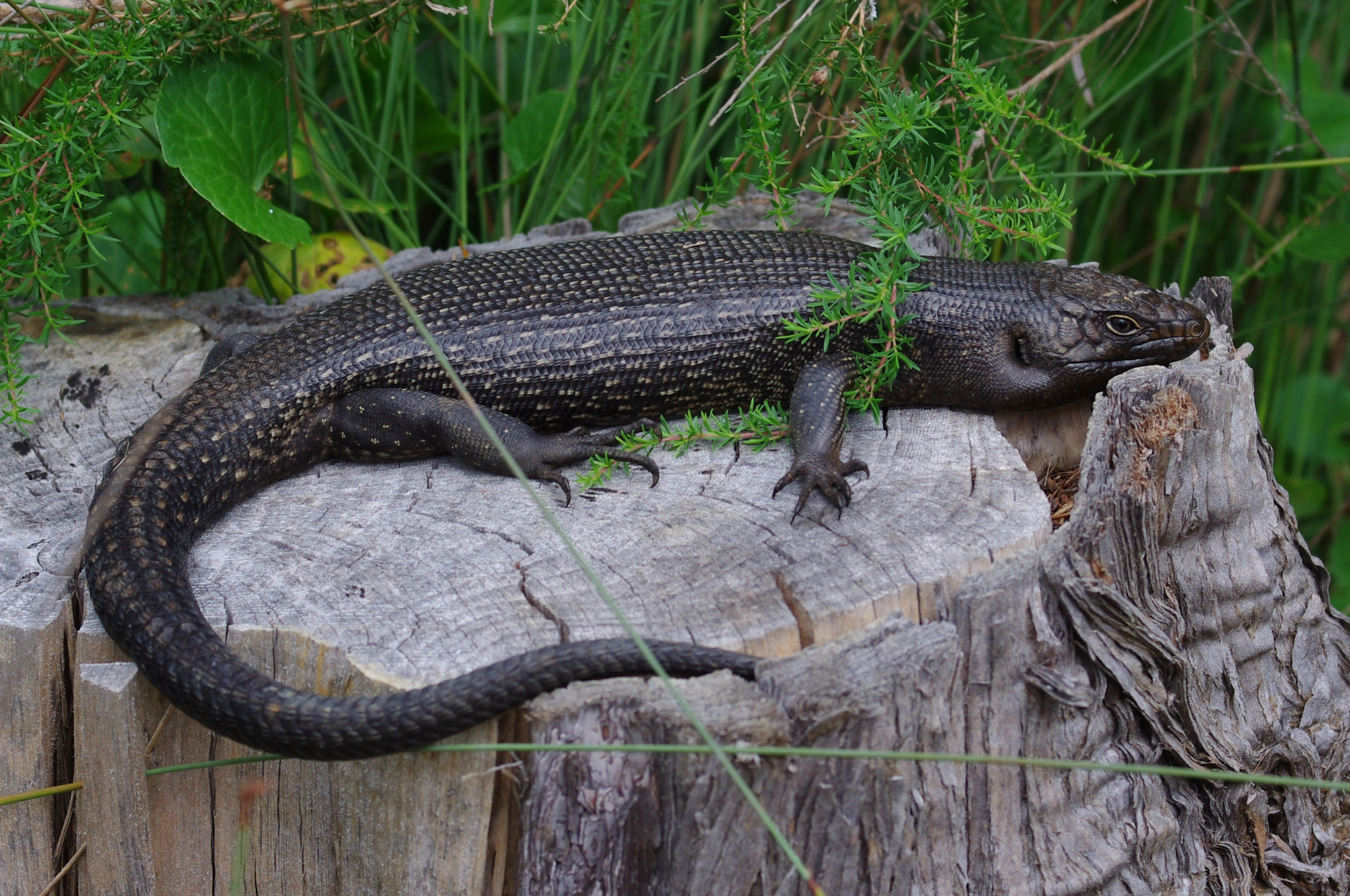
- Albany, Western Australia

Conservation status
- Least Concern (IUCN 3.1)

Scientific classification
- Kingdom: Animalia
- Phylum: Chordata
- Class: Reptilia
- Order: Squamata
- Family: Scincidae
- Genus: Egernia
- Species: E. kingii

Binomial name
- Egernia kingii (Gray, 1838)
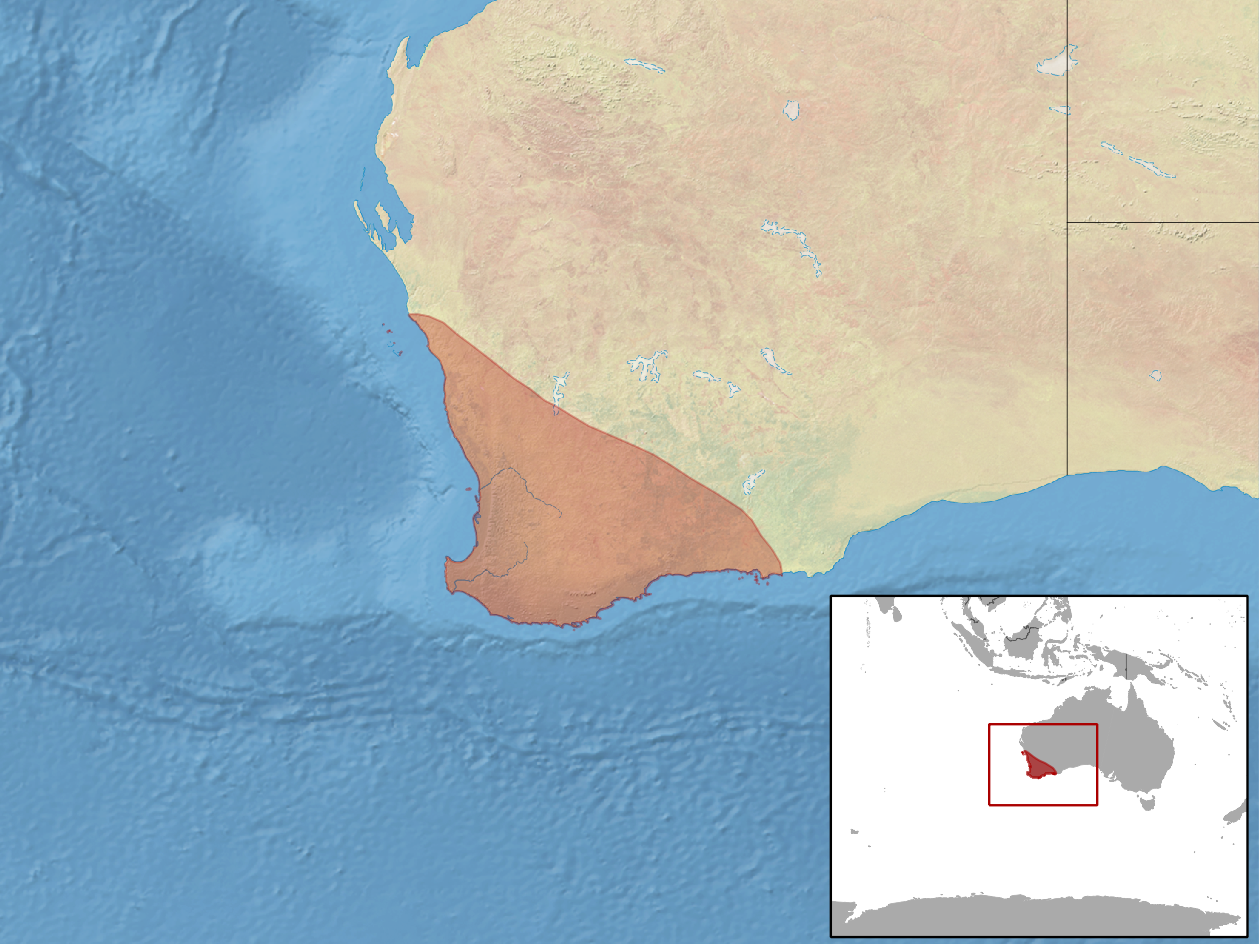

Synonyms
- Tiliqua kingii Gray, 1838; Egernia kingii — Glauert, 1960

= King's skink =

Species of lizard

King's skink (Egernia kingii) is a species of skink, a lizard in the family Scincidae. The species is endemic to Australia.

== Etymology ==
The specific name, kingii, is in honor of Australian Phillip Parker King, who explored the coast of Australia while he was an officer in the Royal Navy.

== Geographic range ==
King's skink is native to coastal regions of south-western Australia. It is common on Rottnest Island and Penguin Island and some coastal areas with open forest and open heath.

== Description ==
King's skink is a large, heavy-bodied black skink that can reach a total length (including tail) of 55 centimetres (22 in) with a mass of 220 grams (8 oz).

== Diet ==
King's skink is omnivorous and consumes mostly softer plant matter from the range of local vegetation, but supplements its diet with insects and birds' eggs.

== As prey ==
King's skink is prey for many animals including tiger snakes (Notechis spp.).

== History ==
A traditional name for King's skink is wandy, given by the Nyungar people of south-west Western Australia. The first European to draw a King's skink was the artist and naturalist Ferdinand Bauer who made a detailed drawing of one during Flinders' expedition in 1801.

== Reproduction ==
Like many skinks, King's skink is viviparous, and after a gestation period of 20–22 weeks, gives birth to litters of 2–8 young that have a typical mass of 7 grams (0.25 oz). Juvenile mortality is high and growth to adult size is slow, so mature King's skinks can be quite long lived.
