= Lamprolepis nieuwenhuisii =

Conservation status
- Least Concern (IUCN 3.1)

Scientific classification
- Kingdom: Animalia
- Phylum: Chordata
- Class: Reptilia
- Order: Squamata
- Family: Scincidae
- Genus: Lamprolepis
- Species: L. nieuwenhuisii

Binomial name
- Lamprolepis nieuwenhuisii (Lidth de Jeude, 1905)
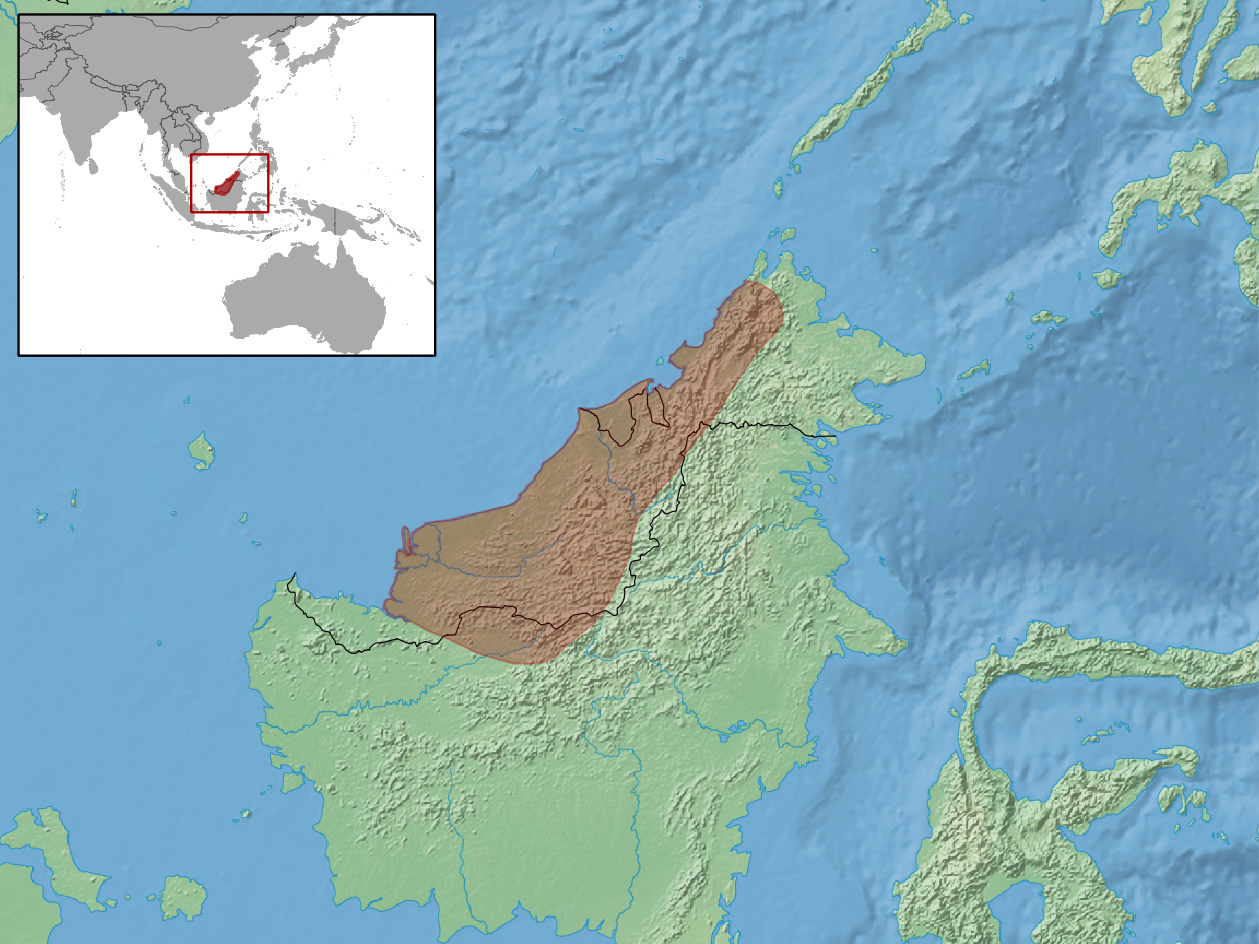

Synonyms
- Lygosoma nieuwenhuisii Lidth de Jeude, 1905; Dasia nieuwenhuisii (Lidth de Jeude, 1905)

Species of lizard

Lamprolepis nieuwenhuisii, also known commonly as Nieuwenhuis's skink, is a species of lizard in the subfamily Lygosominae of the family Scincidae (skinks). The species is endemic to the island of Borneo.

== Etymology ==
The specific name, nieuwenhuisii, is in honor of Dutch explorer and ethnologist Anton Willem Nieuwenhuis.

== Habitat ==
The preferred natural habitat of Lamprolepis nieuwenhuisii is forest, at elevations from sea level to 915 m (3,002 ft).

== Behavior ==
Lamprolepis nieuwenhuisii is arboreal. It lives in the canopy of the forest and rarely descends to the ground.

== Reproduction ==
Lamprolepis nieuwenhuisii is oviparous.
