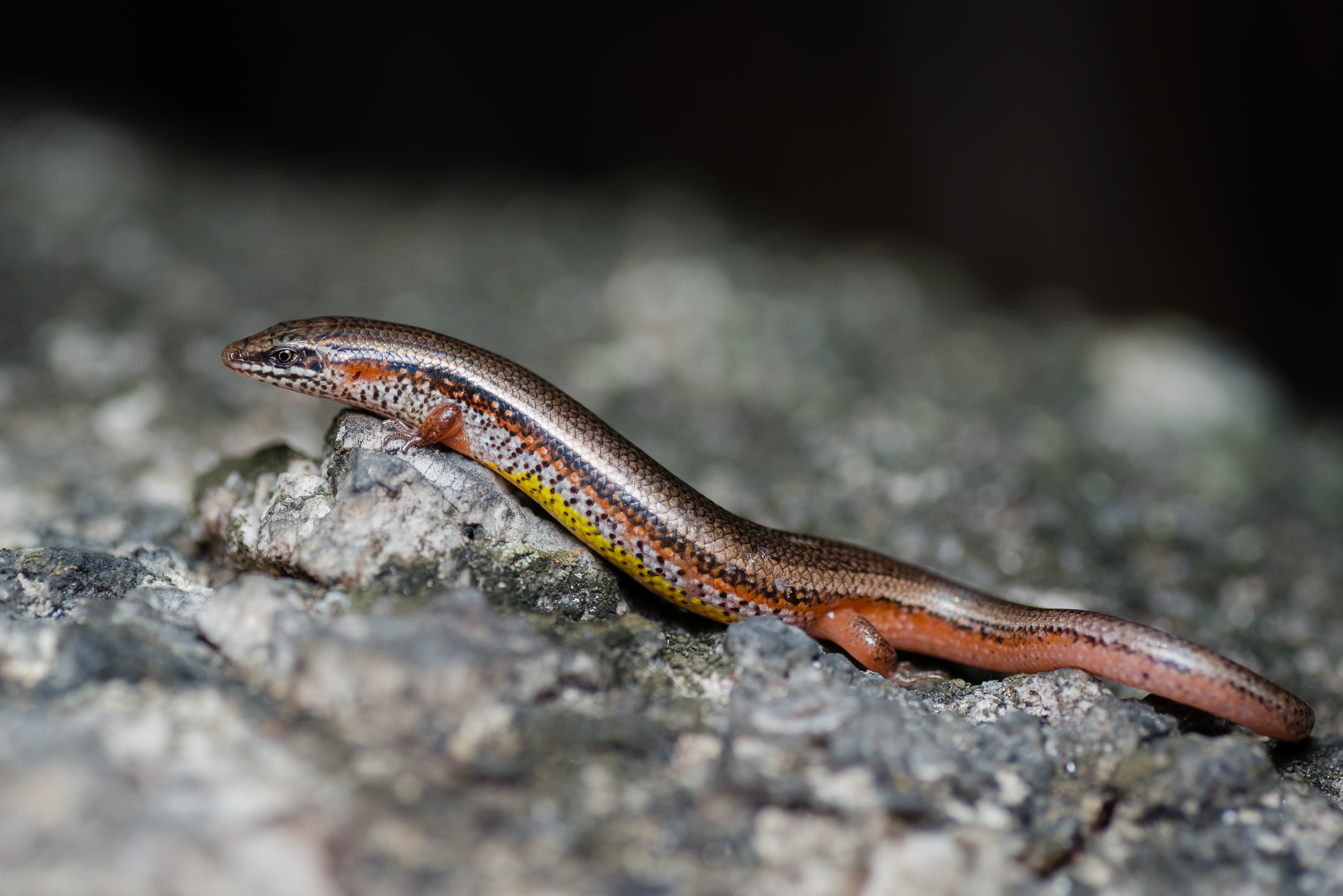
- Subdoluseps bowringii

Scientific classification
- Kingdom: Animalia
- Phylum: Chordata
- Class: Reptilia
- Order: Squamata
- Family: Scincidae
- Subfamily: Lygosominae
- Genus: Subdoluseps; Freitas, Datta-Roy, Karanth, L. Grismer & Siler, 2019

= Subdoluseps =

Genus of lizards

Subdoluseps, also known commonly as supple skinks and writhing skinks, is a genus of lizards in the subfamily Lygosominae of the family Scincidae. Member species were all previously assigned to the genus Lygosoma.

== Species ==
The following species are recognized as being valid.

- Subdoluseps bowringii (Günther, 1864) – Christmas Island grass skink, Bowring's supple skink
- Subdoluseps frontoparietalis (Taylor, 1962) – Taylor's writhing skink, pygmy supple skink
- Subdoluseps herberti (M.A. Smith, 1916) – Herbert's supple skink
- Subdoluseps malayana L. Grismer, Dzukafly, Muin, Quah, Karin, Anuar & Freitas, 2019 – Malaysian supple skink
- Subdoluseps nilgiriensis Ganesh, Srikanthan, Ghosh, Adhikari, S. Kumar & Datta-Roy, 2021 – Nilgiri gracile skink
- Subdoluseps pruthi (Sharma, 1977) – Pruthi's skink
- Subdoluseps samajaya (Karin, Freitas, Shonleben, L. Grismer, Bauer & Das, 2018)
- Subdoluseps vietnamensis M.V. Le, V.D.H. Nguyen, Phan, Rujirawan, Aowphol, Vo, R. Murphy & S.N. Nguyen, 2021 – Vietnam agile skink
