= Spinifex slender blue-tongue =

Conservation status
- Least Concern (IUCN 3.1)

Scientific classification
- Kingdom: Animalia
- Phylum: Chordata
- Class: Reptilia
- Order: Squamata
- Family: Scincidae
- Genus: Cyclodomorphus
- Species: C. melanops

Binomial name
- Cyclodomorphus melanops (Stirling & Zietz, 1893)

Overview of a Lizard species in the blue tongue family

The Spinifex slender blue-tongue or Samphire slender bluetongue (Cyclodomorphus melanops) is an endemic species of skink that inhabits the arid areas of central Australia. The Spinifex slender blue-tongue is closely related to the large blue-tongue skinks (Tiliqua Gray, 1825). However is individually categorised under the Genus Cyclodomorphus and species Cyclodomorphus melanops (C. melanops).

== Taxonomy ==
First discovered in 1867. The spinifex slender lizard was first categorised within the species group of Egernia known as the Günther's Skink (Cyclodomorphus branchialis) (Günther, 1867).

However, in recent times this group underwent a taxonomic redivision causing the spinifex slender blue-tongue to be divided into three different subspecies. This division formed the genus known as the Cyclodomorphus melanops. This is a group that consists of small to medium-sized skinks that inhabit that arid areas of Australia. The Cyclodomorphus melanops subspecies include:

- Cyclodomorphus melanops melanops (Stirling & Zietz, 1893)
- Cyclodomorphus melanops elongatus (Werner, 1910)
- Cyclodomorphus melanops siticulosus (Shea & Miller, 1995)

== Distribution and habitat ==
=== Distribution ===
The C. melanops species are well adapted to the harsh environments of Australia. In turn meaning they are primarily distributed within

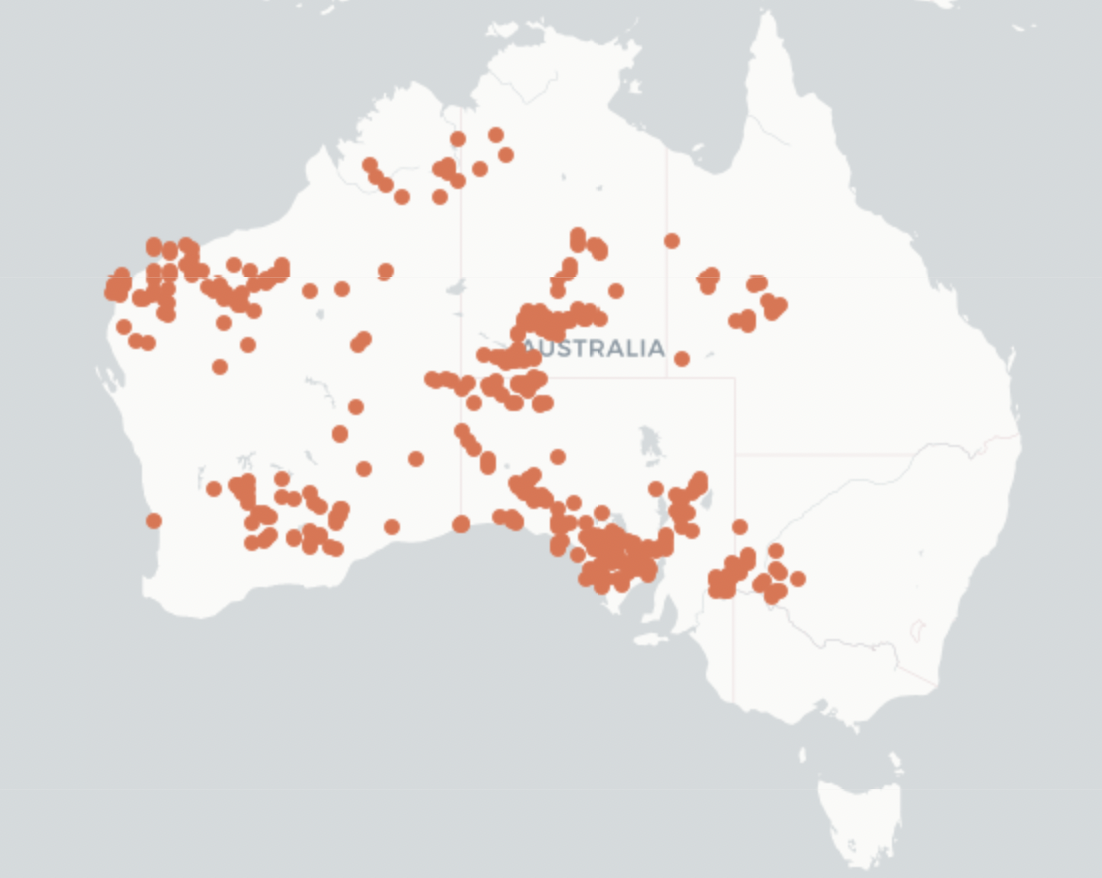
Distribution of Cyclodomorphus melanops across Australia

arid inland areas across Australia, within a range that extends from Western Australia (WA) to western NSW and Queensland (QLD). While they predominantly favour inland regions, it can also inhabit areas along the north coast of WA. The species is found to be most prominent within the southern end of South Australia (SA), midland Australia, and the western side of NSW. This distribution closely correlates with dryer desert environments, characterised by the presence of spinifex grasses. The adaptability of the C. melanops to arid conditions and Spinifex-rich landscapes contributes to its presence across the diverse regions of the Australian continent.

=== Habitat ===
The spinifex slender blue-tongue species is predominantly found within sandy or rocky desert ecosystems that have an abundance of spinifex grasses. The low bearing vegetation of spinifex and clumped grasses aids in providing a shelter for this species while also acting as camouflage from predators. During the daytime, the C. melanops typically searches for shade under rocks and within the Spinifex grass. Providing their adaptive behaviour to the harsh conditions of the desert. The habitat for C. melanops is not only characterised by the presence of Spinifex but also in the abundance of food. This species has a tendency to wait and foraging in open spaces between tussocks for prey. While also relying on spinifex clumps as an escape cover if needed. In turn proving that the relationship between the Spinifex slender blue-tongue and spinifex grasses is important as it aids in the overall survival for this skink species.

== Ecology ==
=== Characteristics ===
The group of the Spinifex slender blue-tongue (Cyclodomorphus melanops) consists of small to medium-sized skinks that are primarily categorised by their slender body type. These species can measure around 12-13 centimetres from their snout to pelvis. With the tail of the animal spanning just shorter or equal to the length of its body. As stated by the name, each of the subspecies have a dark blue tongue colour with a pale upper lip.

==== Cyclodomorphus melanops melanops (Stirling & Zietz, 1893) ====
This subspecies is typically a grey-brown, yellow-brown or orange-brown dorsal colouration with minimal body patterning. The underside is typically the same colour as the dorsal side, just paler. Having dorsal colours with minimal patterning allows for this species to camouflage into its surrounding habitat of light coloured sands. In turn reducing the likelihood of being spotted by predators such as foxes. The limbs for this species are short with small claws except for one longer toe on the hind legs. This aids them in the manoeuvring through the sandy surfaces and climbing up the branches of trees.

==== Cyclodomorphus melanops elongatus (Werner, 1910) ====
The characteristics for this species is similar to that of the one above. However, the body for this subspecies is typically has a slightly darker brown dorsal surface colour with an even darker head. While its ventral surface is generally a lighter shade of brown to the dorsal colour. Unlike the (C. melanops melanops) the tail for the (C. melanops elongatus) has a yellow to orange colouration to it.

Cyclodomorphus melanops siticulosus (Shea & Miller, 1995)

This subspecies typically has an olive grey-brown Dorsal colour with the edge body scales being a slightly darker colour. The underside of this skink is a pale cream yellow to blue-yellow, which reaches up to the underside of its neck down to its tail. With its upper lip and sides of its neck being a pale light grey colour.

Each of these subspecies have minimal patterning on their dorsal surface with colours that match the colours of their surrounding environment. This in turn allows for this species to camouflage into its surrounding habitat of light to darker coloured sands. Which reduces the likelihood of being spotted by predators such as foxes. Each subspecies have short limbs with small claws. However, each of them have one longer toe on their hind legs. This aids them in the manoeuvring through the sandy surfaces into spinifex grasses and climbing up the branches of trees.

=== Behaviour ===
Each of the C. melanops have a solitary, nocturnal behaviour pattern and is typically most active within the late evenings and into the night. These skinks can have a tendency to be spotted within open environments such as roads and walking tracks when hunting for prey. However, they can also have a habit of hiding under rocks or low vegetation such as spinifex grasses where it is able to evade predators and wait for oncoming prey.

=== Reproduction ===
This species reproduces sexually through the means of ovoviviparous. C. melanops typically can produce up to three live young at a time. With this species producing a higher number of offspring it can allow for a greater chance of the young's survival within the harsh and arid habitats.

=== Diet ===
The C. melanops can have a varied diet of selected vegetation and insects. However, this species of C. melanops is considered to be a carnivore. As its primary food source consists of spiders, termites, grasshoppers, beetles and moths. Due to most of the primary habitat for these insects being around low bearing vegetation the correlation of this species survival is also dependent on these vegetation types. A main reason why this species will occasionally feed on flora. Is primarily because water supplies within arid areas of Australia are very limited. As a result, this species has adapted to feeding on fleshy leaves and some fruit for a source of water.

== Conservation status ==
As of 2021 the Scientific committee, within the New South Wales (NSW) Government, stated that the species C. melanops elongatus has been categorised as an "Endangered Species'' under Part 1 of the threatened species Conservation Act of 1995. While also listing another species of close relation (Günther's Skink) as a "Vulnerable Species" under part 2 of the Act.

The international classification for the species remains least concern.

== Evolutionary relationships- distinguishing features ==
This species is closely related to the blue-tongued skinks (Austin & Arnold 2006) and the Cyclodomorphus branchialis (C.branchialis) species, through the Günther's Skink genus. However, the primary distinguishing difference between the C.branchialis and the C. melanops species, is that the spinifex skink has a greater amount of scales on its body. As it can have over 24 midbody scales and 62-80 paravertebral scales. In turn providing a distinguishing factor made between the C.branchialis and blue-tongue lizard species.
