= Tree skink (disambiguation) =

Tree skink is primarily the common name of members of the skink genus Dasia.

It can also refer to:

- Cryptoblepharus, also known as snake-eyed skinks or shining-skinks
- Lamprolepis, also known as emerald skinks
- Niveoscincus, also known as snow skinks or cool skinks
- Prasinohaema, also known as green-blooded skinks
- Egernia striolata, the Australian tree skinks
