= Betsey Island =

Island in Tasmania, Australia

Native name: Temeteletta
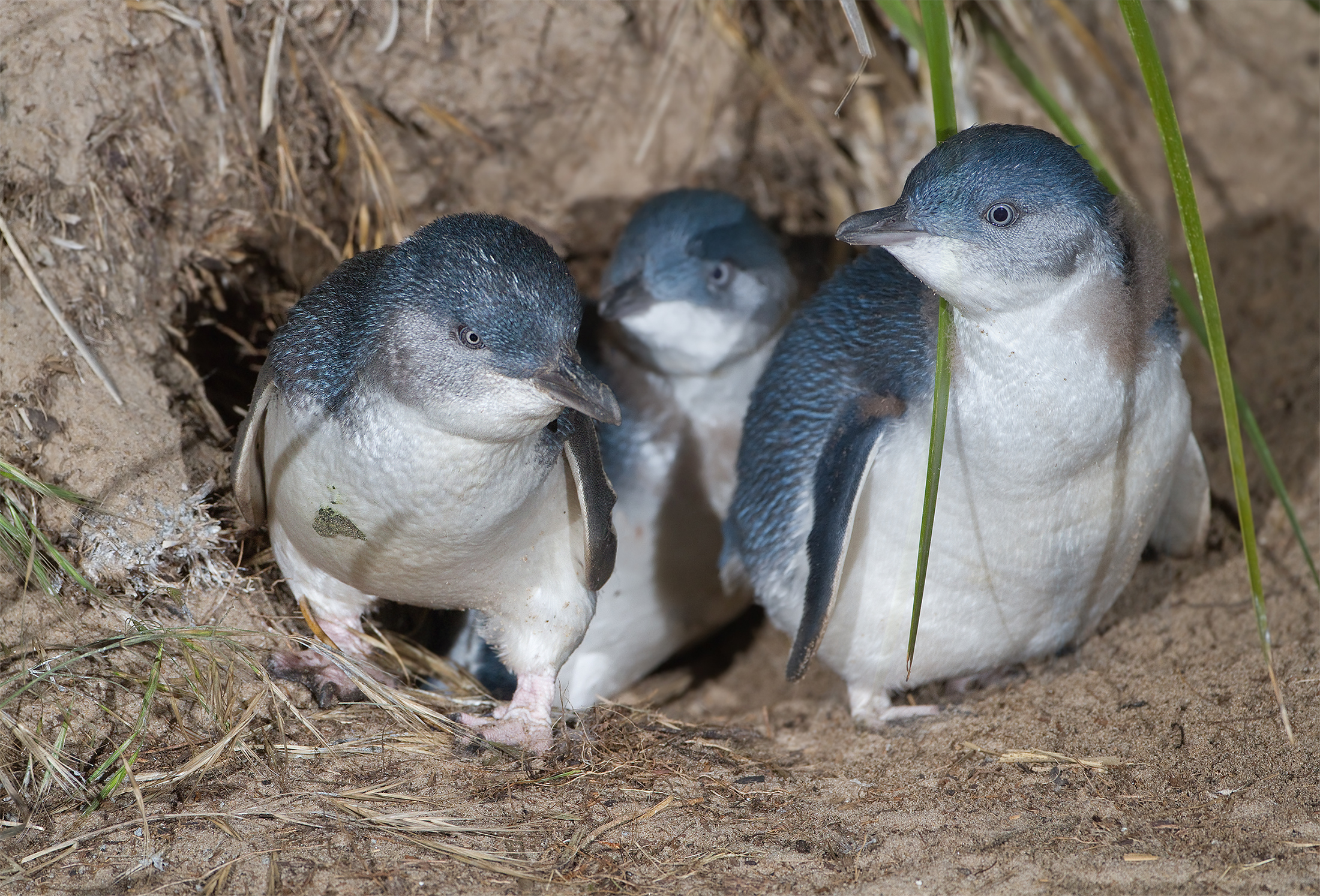
- Betsey Island is an important breeding site for little penguins

- Location within Tasmania

Geography
- Location: River Derwent
- Coordinates: 43°03′S 147°29′E

Administration
- Australia
- State: Tasmania

Betsey Island, along with the adjacent Little Betsey Island and Betsey Reef, forms a nature reserve with an area of 176 ha in south-eastern Australia. They are part of the Betsey Island Group, lying close to the south-eastern coast of Tasmania around the entrance to the River Derwent. It is classified as an Important Bird Area by BirdLife International; it is an important site for little penguins with an estimated 15,000 pairs breeding there, short-tailed shearwaters (130,000-170,000 nesting burrows), and black-faced cormorants (over 200 breeding pairs).

== Name ==
The Aboriginal name of the island is Temeteletta.

The island has previously been known as Lady Franklin Island, Franklin Island, Betsy Island and Willaumez Island.

The first European name of the island was 'Bett's Island' after an officer who was on board an early ship exploring the region. Though an alternate explanation has been that a man called Betts was the original owner: 'The correct name is Betts's Island, the first owner having been a person of the name of Betts. Popular usage has sanctioned a different spelling.' (Cassell's Picturesque Australasia (1889): page 142)

== Flora and fauna ==
The northern part of the island is dominated by Tasmanian blue gum forest, with the southern part mainly sedgeland. There is succulent salt marsh on the west. Problem weeds are Cape Leeuwin wattle and boxthorn.

Apart from the penguins, shearwaters and cormorants, kelp gulls and white-bellied sea-eagles have nested there. European rabbits have been present on the island since 1825. Reptiles present include the she-oak skink and White's skink.
