= Subdoluseps herberti =

Conservation status
- Least Concern (IUCN 3.1)

Scientific classification
- Kingdom: Animalia
- Phylum: Chordata
- Class: Reptilia
- Order: Squamata
- Family: Scincidae
- Genus: Subdoluseps
- Species: S. herberti

Binomial name
- Subdoluseps herberti (M.A. Smith, 1916)

Synonyms
- Lygosoma herberti M.A. Smith, 1916; Riopa herberti — Cochran, 1930; Subdoluseps herberti — Freitas et al., 2019

Species of lizard

Herbert's supple skink (Subdoluseps herberti), also known commonly as Herbert's writhing skink is a species of lizard in the subfamily Lygosominae of the family Scincidae. The species is native to Malaysia and Thailand.

== Etymology ==
The specific name, herberti, is in honor of English ornithologist E.G. Herbert, who worked in Siam (Thailand).

== Habitat ==
The preferred natural habitat of S. herberti is forest.

== Reproduction ==
The mode of reproduction of S. herberti is unknown.
