= Subdoluseps frontoparietalis =

Conservation status
- Data Deficient (IUCN 3.1)

Scientific classification
- Kingdom: Animalia
- Phylum: Chordata
- Class: Reptilia
- Order: Squamata
- Family: Scincidae
- Genus: Subdoluseps
- Species: S. frontoparietalis

Binomial name
- Subdoluseps frontoparietalis (Taylor, 1962)
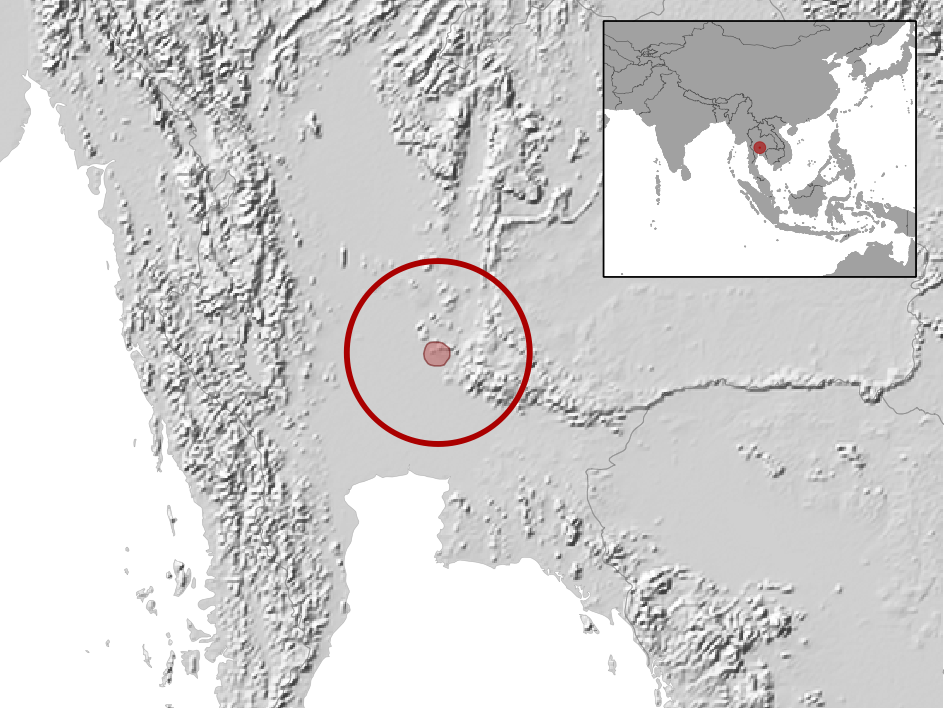

Species of lizard

Subdoluseps frontoparietalis, also known commonly as the pygmy supple skink and Taylor's writhing skink, is a species of lizard in the subfamily Lygosominae of the family Scincidae. The species is endemic to Thailand.
