= Emerald skink =

Emerald skink may refer to:

- Lamprolepis, the emerald skinks
- Dasia, commonly known as tree skinks
