= A. W. Nieuwenhuis =

Dutch explorer and physician (1864–1953)

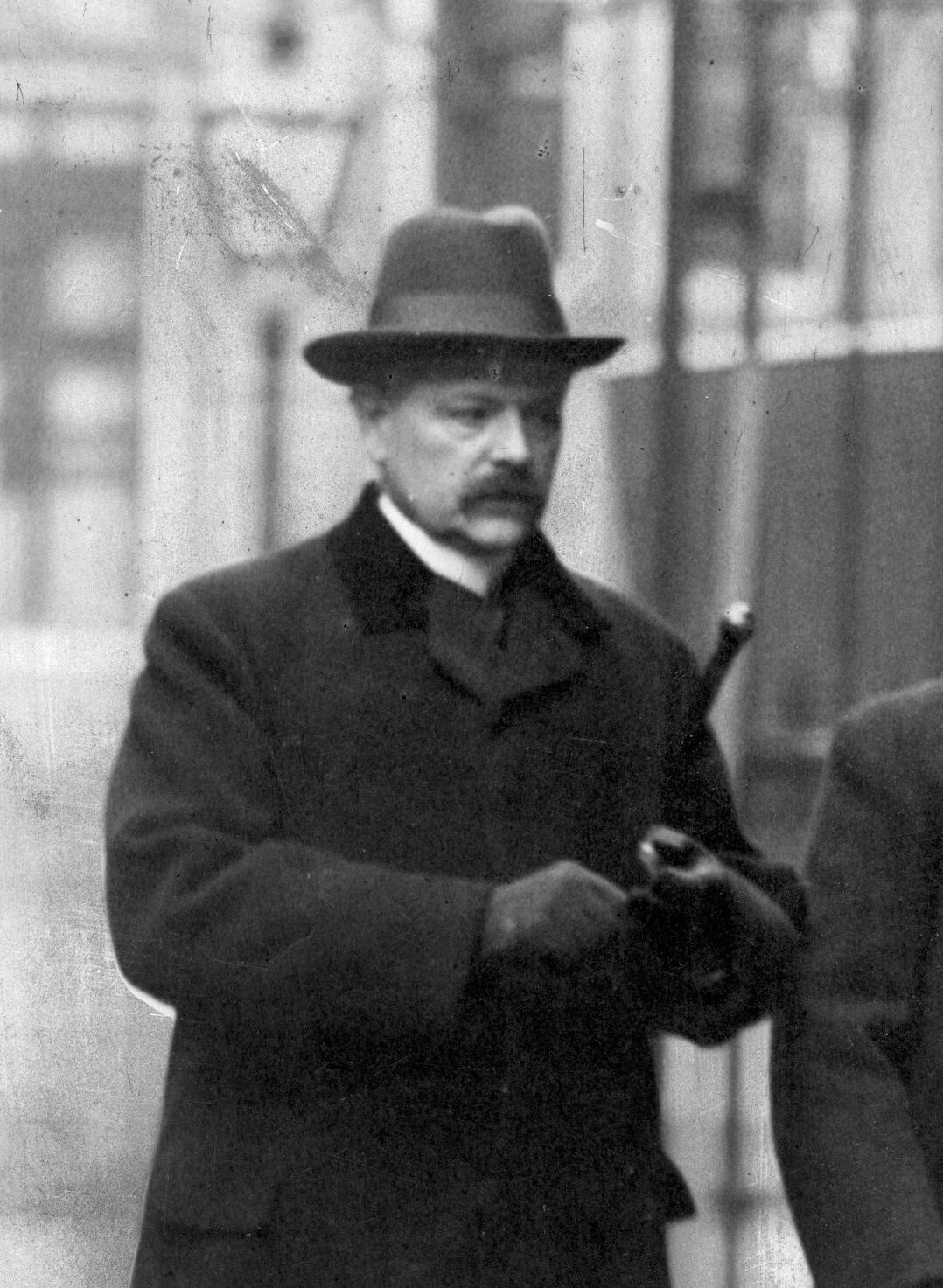
Nieuwenhuis in 1917

Anton Willem Nieuwenhuis (22 May 1864 – 21 September 1953) was a Dutch explorer and physician who travelled extensively in central Borneo in the 1890s, recording valuable ethnographic information about the Dayak people and making biological collections.

Nieuwenhuis studied medicine at Leiden University from 1883 to 1889 and took his doctoral degree from the University of Freiburg in 1890. That year, he joined the armed forces to become a medical officer in the Royal Dutch East Indies Army, stationed in 1892 at Sambas, West Kalimantan. He participated in three major expeditions to parts of Borneo not then under Dutch control, the first of which took place under the leadership of Gustaaf Adolf Frederik Molengraaff in 1893–1894. He then became the first European to cross Borneo from west to east (or vice versa), from Pontianak to Samarinda, in 1896–1897. The third expedition took place in 1898–1900.

In 1904, Nieuwenhuis was appointed professor of geography and ethnology at Leiden University and became the editor of the journal Internationales Archiv für Ethnographie. He retired in May 1934 and died in his new hometown in 1953. In an obituary, Bertram E. Smythies called him "a Borneo Livingstone".

== Taxon named in his honor ==
Taxa named after him include the lizard Lamprolepis nieuwenhuisii, the orchid Bulbophyllum nieuwenhuisii, and the blue-wattled bulbul (Brachypodius nieuwenhuisii).

== Publications ==
- Nieuwenhuis, Anton Willem (1900). In Centraal Borneo: reis van Pontianak naar Samarinda. E.J. Brill: Leyden. (in Dutch)
- Nieuwenhuis, Anton Willem (1904–1907). Quer durch Borneo: Ergebnisse seiner Reisen in den Jahren 1894, 1896–97 und 1898–1900. E.J. Brill: Leyden. (German edition).
