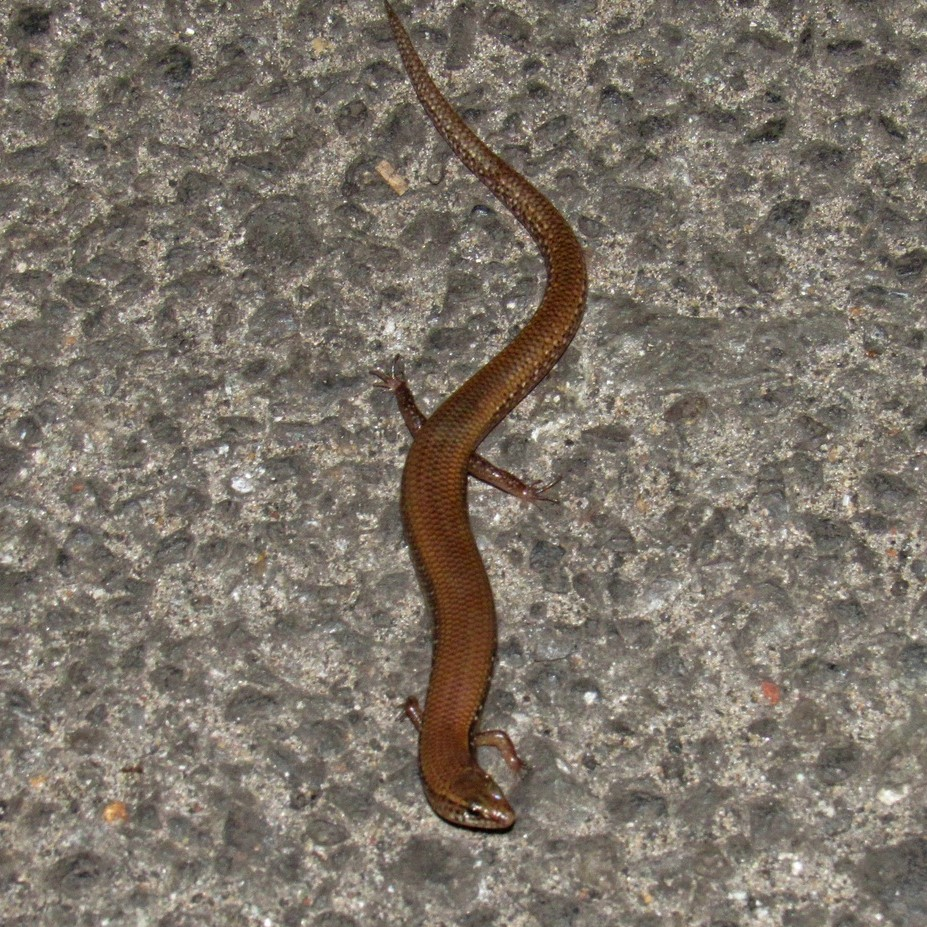
- Dravidoseps goaensis

Scientific classification
- Kingdom: Animalia
- Phylum: Chordata
- Class: Reptilia
- Order: Squamata
- Family: Scincidae
- Subfamily: Lygosominae
- Genus: Dravidoseps; Ishan Agarwal, Tejas Thackeray & Akshay Khandekar, 2024

= Dravidoseps =

Genus of Skinks

Dravidoseps is a genus of skinks, found in southern India. They were all previously placed in the genera Subdoluseps and Riopa.

== Species ==
The genus is made up of the following species:

- Dravidoseps gingeeensis Agarwal, Thackeray & Khandekar, 2024
- Dravidoseps goaensis (Sharma, 1976) - Goan supple skink
- Dravidoseps jawadhuensis Agarwal, Thackeray & Khandekar, 2024
- Dravidoseps kalakadensis Agarwal, Thackeray & Khandekar, 2024
- Dravidoseps nilgiriensis Ganesh, Srikanthan, Ghosh, Adhikari, Kumar & Datta-Roy, 2021 - Nilgiri gracile skink
- Dravidoseps pruthi (Sharma, 1976) - Pruthi's supple skink
- Dravidoseps srivilliputhurensis Agarwal, Thackeray & Khandekar, 2024
- Dravidoseps tamilnaduensis Agarwal, Thackeray & Khandekar, 2024
