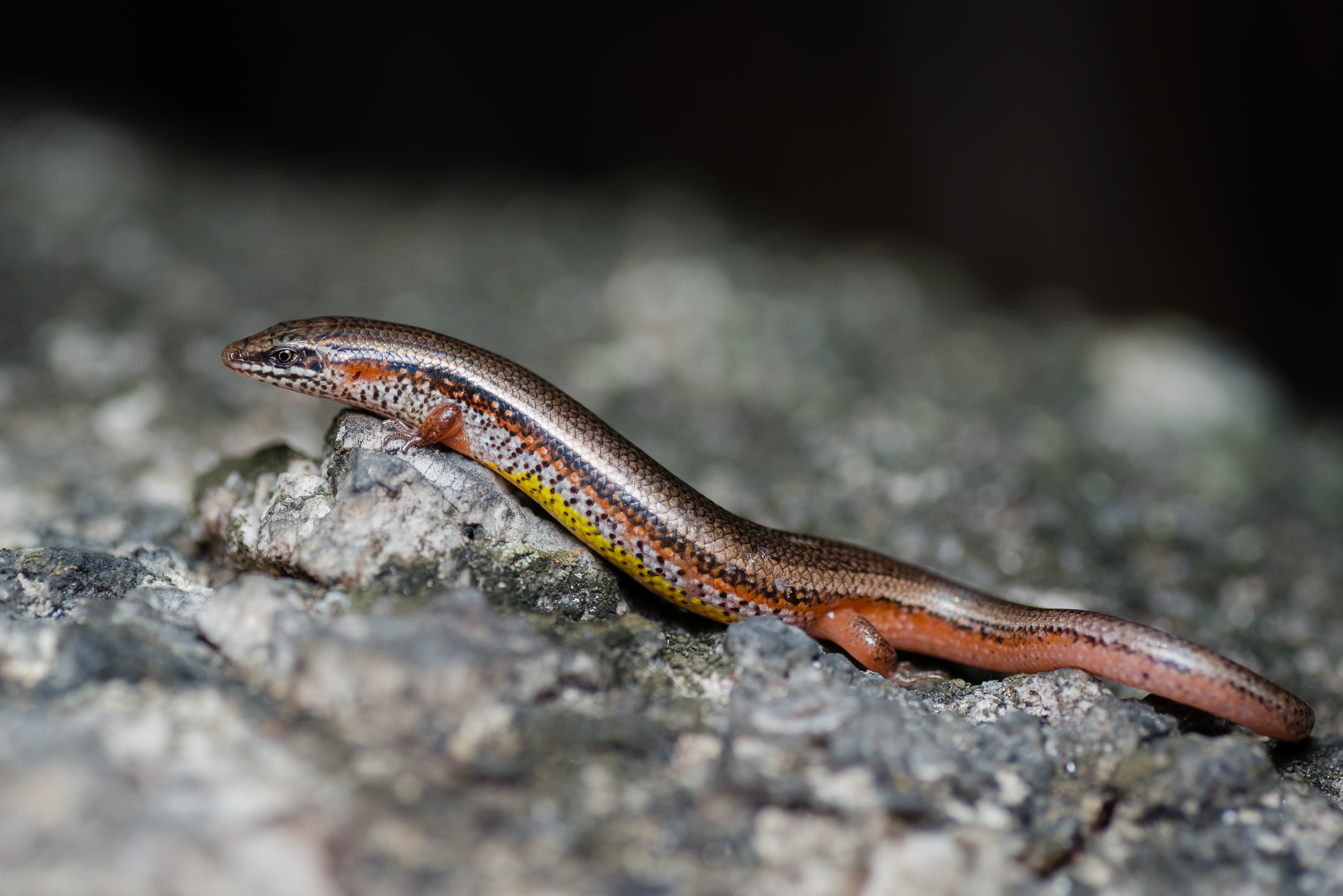
- Subdoluseps bowringii from Petchaburi Province, Thailand

Conservation status
- Least Concern (IUCN 3.1)

Scientific classification
- Kingdom: Animalia
- Phylum: Chordata
- Class: Reptilia
- Order: Squamata
- Family: Scincidae
- Genus: Subdoluseps
- Species: S. bowringii

Binomial name
- Subdoluseps bowringii (Günther, 1864)

Synonyms
- Eumeces bowringii Günther, 1864; Euprepes punctatolineatus W. Peters, 1871 (ex errore); Euprepes punctatostriatus W. Peters, 1871; Lygosoma bowringii — Boulenger, 1887; Lygosoma comotti Boulenger, 1887; Lygosoma whiteheadi Mocquard, 1890; Riopa bowringii — Taylor, 1922; Mochlus bowringii — Ebenhard & Sjögren, 1984; Lygosoma bowringii — Cogger, 1994; Subdoluseps bowringii — Freitas et al., 2019

= Subdoluseps bowringii =

Species of lizard

Subdoluseps bowringii, also known commonly as Bowring's supple skink, Bowring's writhing skink, and the Christmas Island grass-skink, is a species of lizard in the subfamily Lygosominae of the family Scincidae. The species is native to Southeast Asia.

== Etymology ==
The specific name, bowringii, is in honor of either John Charles Bowring, who was a British amateur naturalist and businessman in Hong Kong, or his father John Bowring, who was a British diplomat and a governor of Hong Kong.

== Geographic range ==
West Malaysia, Pulau Tioman, Johor
Pulau Besar, Pulau Sibu; India (Andaman Islands),
Philippines (Sulu Archipelago),
Indonesia (Borneo, Sumatra ?, Java, Sulawesi),
China (Hong Kong ), Singapore, India, Bangladesh,
Indochina west to Myanmar (= Burma), Vietnam, Thailand, Laos, Cambodia,
Australia (Cook Islands and Christmas Island).

Type locality: Hong Kong.
