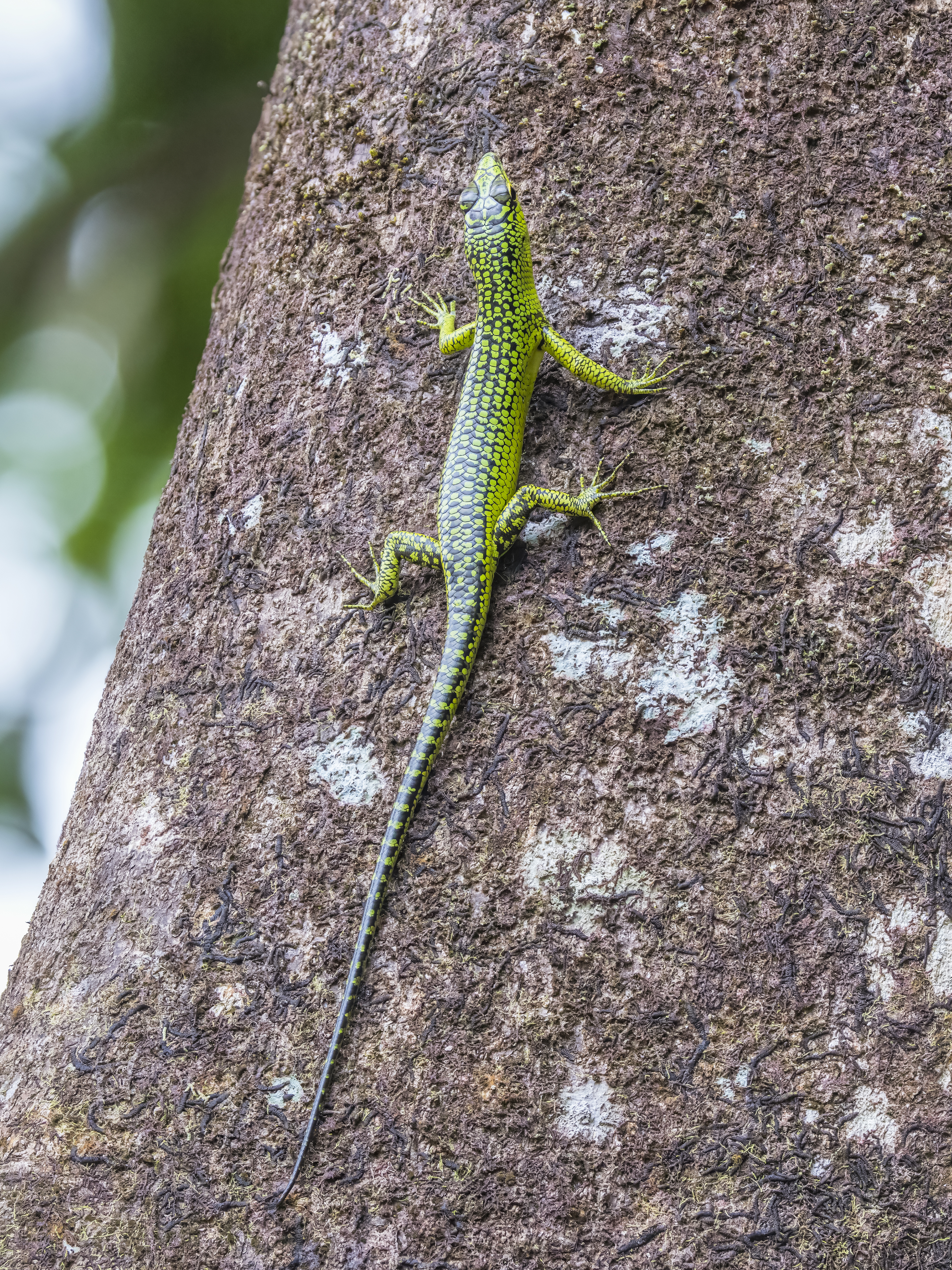
- Lamprolepis smaragdina viridipuncta Koror, Palau

Conservation status
- Least Concern (IUCN 3.1)

Scientific classification
- Kingdom: Animalia
- Phylum: Chordata
- Class: Reptilia
- Order: Squamata
- Family: Scincidae
- Genus: Lamprolepis
- Species: L. smaragdina

Binomial name
- Lamprolepis smaragdina (Lesson, 1830)

= Lamprolepis smaragdina =

Species of lizard

Lamprolepis smaragdina, the emerald tree skink, is also sometimes (ambiguously) known as green tree skink or emerald green skink. It is a non-threatened species which is not commonly seen, but it is becoming more popular in the exotic pet trade.

== Description ==
The emerald tree skink is generally bright lime green in color, with large black eyes rimmed with yellow. However, their rear limbs or the lower half of their body may be medium brown with white speckling. In some cases, the entire body is brown or speckled with black. They are generally between 8.5-10" in total length.

== Names ==
It is known as 'kuka' in the Kotos Amarasi language of West Timor, Indonesia. In the Philippines, it is called 'tabili' in Cebuano and in Waray.

== Evolutionary genetics ==
Linkem, et al. (2013) found that the most divergent clades of L. smaragdina were in Sulawesi. Oceanic populations represent the most recent expansions. The origin of populations on most islands is attributed primarily to waif dispersals prior to human colonization, although human-aided dispersals cannot be ruled out for some populations.

== Geographical distribution ==
It is found in arboreal forests of Taiwan, Palawan, Luzon, Davao and Sulu archipelagoes in the Philippines, New Guinea as well as the Indo-Australian archipelago and down south to the Solomon and Santa Cruz islands. This taxa can also be found on Sulawesi.

The emerald tree skink is frequently found in palm plantations in disturbed coastal areas.

== Feeding habits and diet ==
It is mostly carnivorous, feeding on insects and other small creatures, although occasionally it may devour fruit and leafy plants. In some areas, it even steals dog food.

== Behavior ==
They prefer bare tree trunks without climbing plants. Several have even been sighted on minute islands with very little greenery, the record being four palm trees. It is a highly active species. Always on the move and is very squirmy if handled. They are an unaggressive species and sometimes observed to form little groups to gang up on bigger prey. They are social towards humans, with pet owners reporting the skinks "greet" them as they approach their enclosures.

== Reproduction and breeding habits ==
Courtship ritual is the same as most lizards. It as an oviparous species meaning it lays eggs rather than bear live young like most members of the skink family do. Eggs are usually laid in clusters of two. They can be easily bred in captivity and may live an average 7–12 years in captivity.
