= Dravidoseps pruthi =

Conservation status
- Data Deficient (IUCN 3.1)

Scientific classification
- Kingdom: Animalia
- Phylum: Chordata
- Class: Reptilia
- Order: Squamata
- Family: Scincidae
- Genus: Dravidoseps
- Species: D. pruthi

Binomial name
- Dravidoseps pruthi (Sharma, 1977)

Synonyms
- Riopa pruthi Sharma, 1977; Lygosoma pruthi (Sharma, 1977); Subdoluseps pruthi (Sharma, 1977)

Species of lizard

Dravidoseps pruthi, commonly known as Pruthi's skink or Pruthi's supple skink, is a species of diurnal, terrestrial, insectivorous, lizard in the family Scincidae. The species is endemic to the southern part of the Eastern Ghats in South India. The species was first described based on the type specimen from Chitteri hills in Dharmapuri district of Tamil Nadu. Further surveys reveal the presence of similar-looking skinks in nearby hill ranges. Though described in 1977, the holotype was collected in 1929, and yet very little is known or has been published about this species.

== Etymology ==
The specific name, pruthi, is in honor of Indian entomologist Hem Singh Pruthi (1897–1969), who collected the holotype from Chitteri Hills of central Tamil Nadu.

== Distribution and habitat ==
Dravidoseps pruthi is found in the southern part of the Eastern Ghats in Dharmapuri district of Tamil Nadu, in South India. This species has been sighted in other ranges of the Eastern Ghats in Tamil Nadu. Further work is necessary to fully chart its geographic range.

The preferred natural habitat is forest, at altitudes around 250 m (820 ft).

== Reproduction ==
Dravidoseps pruthi is viviparous.
