= Saltbush slender bluetongue =

Conservation status
- Least Concern (IUCN 3.1)

Scientific classification
- Kingdom: Animalia
- Phylum: Chordata
- Class: Reptilia
- Order: Squamata
- Family: Scincidae
- Genus: Cyclodomorphus
- Species: C. venustus

Binomial name
- Cyclodomorphus venustus Shea & Miller, 1995

Species of lizard

The saltbush slender bluetongue (Cyclodomorphus venustus) is a species of lizard in the family Scincidae. The species is endemic to the arid interior of eastern Australia. Although its conservation status is of least concern, it has been listed as endangered in New South Wales. The slender saltbush bluetongue has been recorded in Sturt National Park in New South Wales but extends into northeast South Australia and south-west Queensland.

The saltbush slender bluetongue is a terrestrial, insectivorous skink that forages in the shelter of shrubbery and lives in stony areas and saltbush flats. The saltbush slender bluetongue is a skink native to Australia. They range from a light grey to pink-brown colour on the upper surface of their bodies with darker patches on the sides of their neck, their underside is a cream to yellow colour and they have bright orange irises. It has short limbs and is generally around 100mm in length but can be up to 180mm.

== Distribution ==
The saltbush slender bluetongue has been recorded in areas from samphire flats and areas associated with heavy clay soils. It has a patchy, fragmented distribution throughout central Australia, occurring in three main bioregions of the Stony Plains, Flinders Lofty Block and Channel Country. The actual distribution and population of the saltbush slander bluetongue may be underreported due to minimal surveyance and species identification in some areas where it is believed to inhabit. The distribution of the saltbush bluetongue is also changing due to modifications to their habitat through increasing temperatures, pushing the species' range further south. The occurrence of rainfall in the region will also have an impact as this lizard relies on shrubbery as a microhabitat, shelter and is the habitat of their food source. During times of drought, plant density will decrease along with access to food.

== Taxonomy ==
The Scincidae family of skinks is a large family that currently represents one-quarter of all lizard species. The saltbush slender bluetongue is a skink of the family Scincidae and the genus Cyclodomorphus. It has been presented in an article by Zootaxa that the Scincidae family should be broken up into smaller revised superfamilies and families. This approach would put Cyclodomorphus venustus in the superfamily Lygosomoidea and the subfamily Egerniidae. A study conducted by Austin and Arnold supports this link through DNA analysis of different sub-genera of the genus-group Egernia and provides a genetic link between Cyclodomorphus species and the family and genus groups Lygosomoidea and Egerniidae. There are nine species of lizard which belong to the Cyclodomorphus genera. The defining features of the Egerniidae family which includes the saltbush bluetongue are the presence of eight or fewer premaxillary teeth; The parietals are entirely separated by the interparietal and are bordered along the posterolateral edges by a nuchal and two or more temporals; the outer preanal scales overlap inner preanal scales; scales on the dorsal surface of the fourth toe are in two rows and the iris is paler than the pupil. Austin and Arnold determined that of the species classified under the genus-group Egernia, the sub-genera Tiliqua and Cyclodomorphus are the most closely related.

== Ecology ==
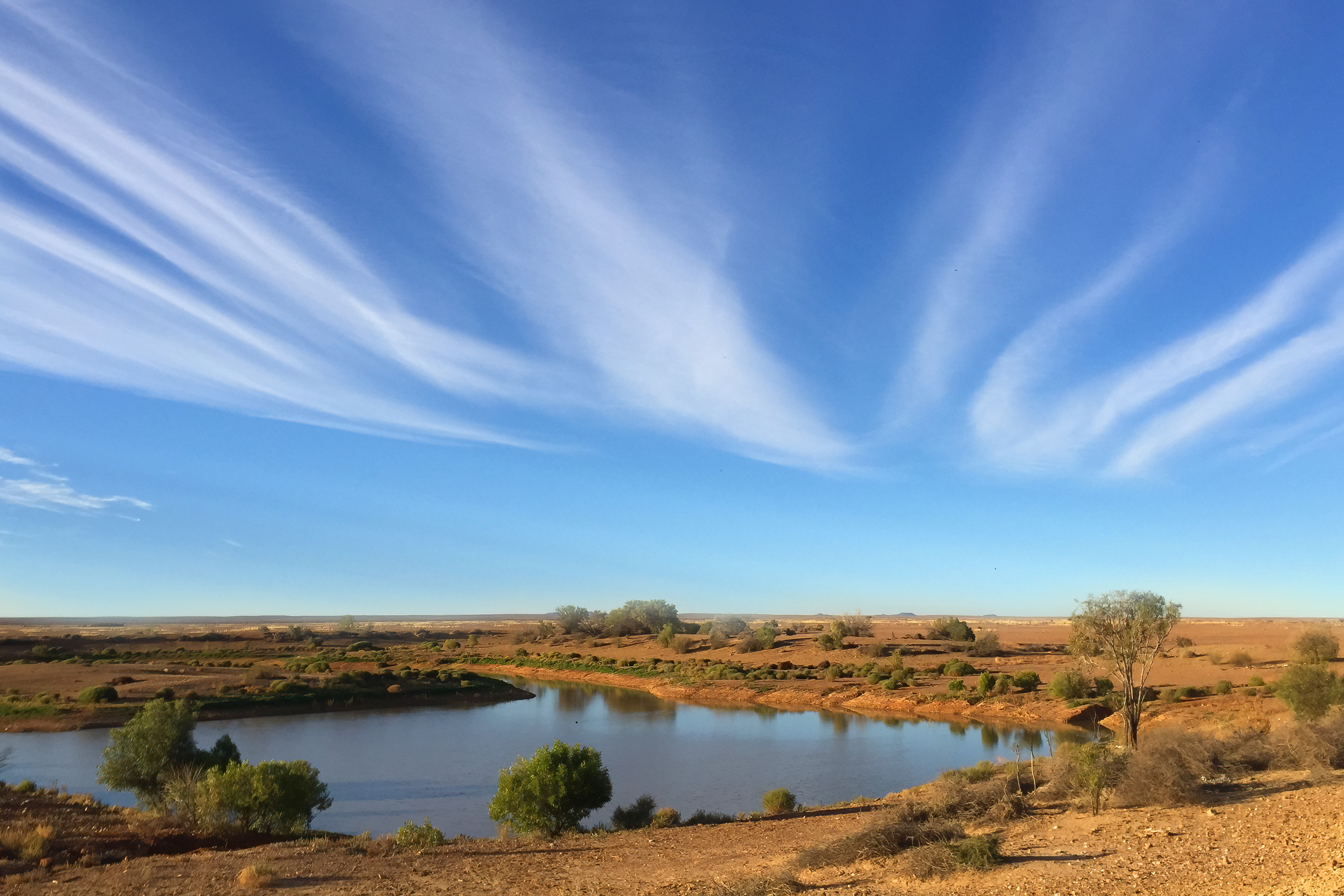
Sturt National Park

Lives in arid areas of central Australia and dry tropical to subtropical shrublands. The areas are generally, hot, dry and contain mainly heavy clay soils, stony plains and sands. They live in close proximity to ephemeral waterways where there is access to shrubbery and grassy understoreys such as Saltbush (Atriplex nummularia). The shrubbery acts as shelter during the day as they are assumed to be most active in the early morning or evening. The shrubbery also acts as an area to hide from prey. Saltbush slender bluetongues are ambush opportunistic hunters and prey on small invertebrates which cross their path, they also eat flowers, fleshy leaves and fruits that may grow in the area.

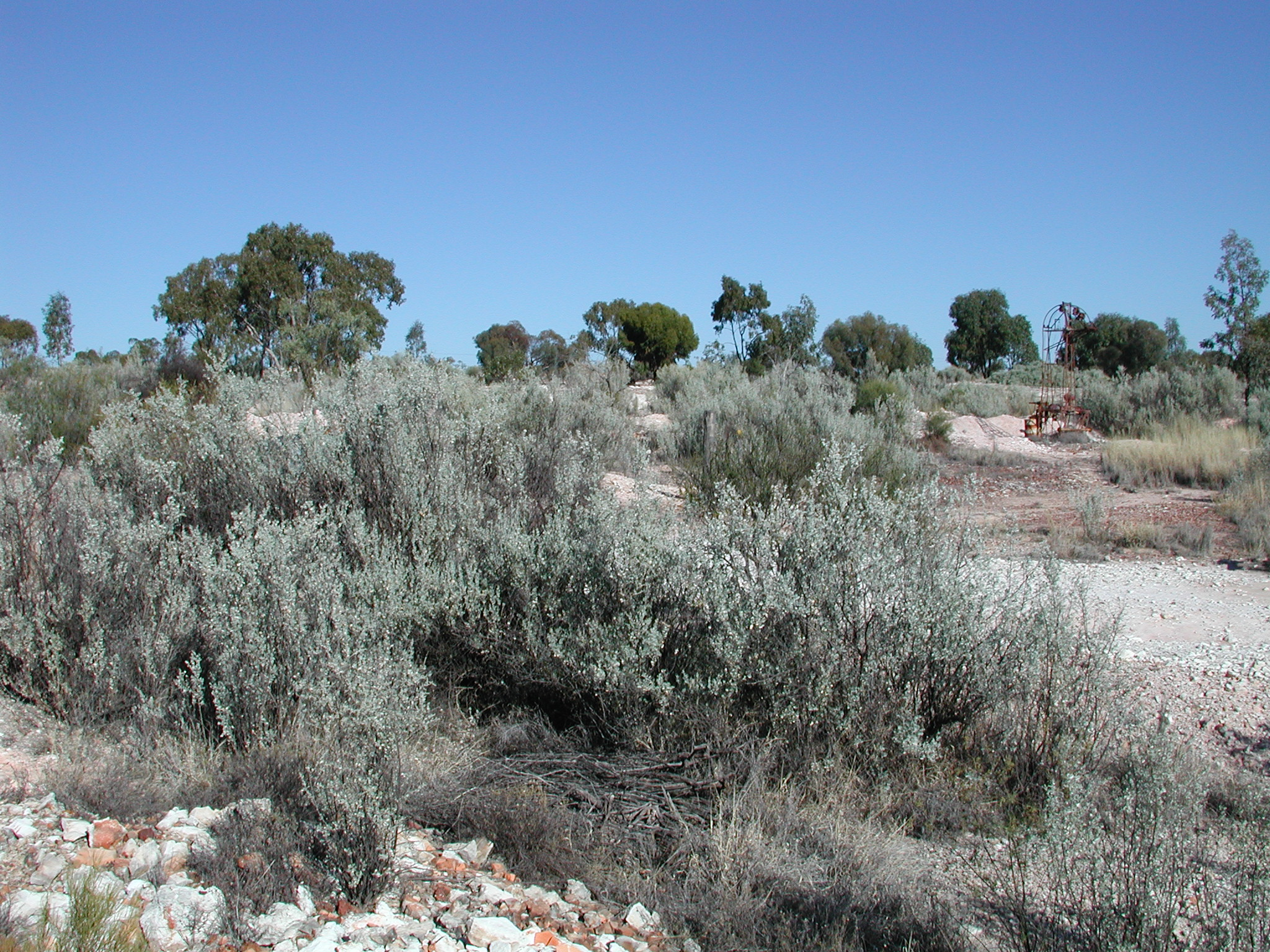
Atriplex nummularia: saltbush plant found in Sturt National Park

The conservation status of the saltbush slender bluetongue is considered least concern in the inhabited areas of Queensland and South Australia and there do not appear to be any major threats to their populations in these areas. In New South Wales, however, they are considered endangered as less than 10% of the species resides in this state. There are some threats that could have an impact on the populations of this species in the New South Wales area. Land clearance, degradation and habitat fragmentation for agricultural purposes outside of Sturt National Park limit the potential habitat available to this species in New South Wales. Small, isolated populations are vulnerable to elimination in an area due to extreme events such as natural disasters. Predation by feral animals such as foxes and cats is also a prominent threat to population levels in New South Wales and can also have an effect on populations in South Australia and Queensland. Habitat destruction and food resource reduction by heavy grazing and trampling is another threat to saltbush slender bluetongue populations throughout central Australia by domestic stock, rabbits and feral goats and pigs. Another area of concern outlined by the NSW government is the lack of knowledge of the specific impact of these threats on the population of saltbush slender bluetongues within Sturt National Park resulting in a limited number of strategies and management plans to deal with these threats.
