= Hem Singh Pruthi =

Indian entomologist

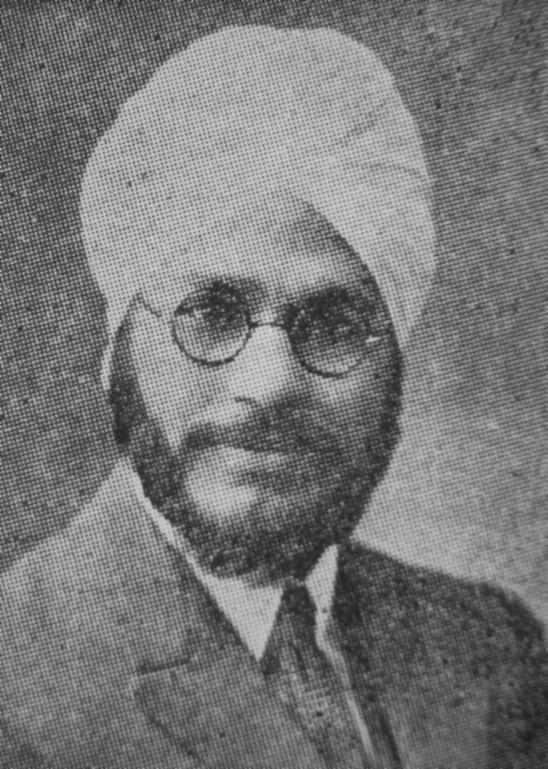

Hem Singh Pruthi (23 February 1897 – 23 December 1969) was an Indian entomologist who served as Imperial Entomologist, being the first native Indian in that position.

He was born at Begowala, Sialkot where his father Dr Bhagat Singh Pruthi worked in the Police and Jail Hospital at Gujranwala. He studied locally and completed his MSc at the Government College in Lahore and joined Peterhouse, Cambridge, where he was a Charles Abercrombie Smith Student and obtained a Ph.D. in 1924. Pruthi received an Sc.D. from the University of Cambridge in 1943. He then became an assistant superintendent at the Zoological Survey of India at Calcutta. He worked mainly on the Hemiptera. He then joined the Indian Agricultural Research Institute and became the Imperial Entomologist, succeeding T.B. Fletcher in 1934. In 1938 he founded the Entomological Society of India. Pruthi's work during this period was mainly on insects of economic importance. He was a plant protection advisor to the Government of India and helped establish a locust warning system. He retired in 1953. In 1963 he published a Textbook of Agricultural Entomology.

A number of genera of hemipterans have been named after him including Pruthiana, Pruthiorosius, and Pruthius. His student M.S. Mani named a fly genus Pruthidiplosis after him.

A species of Indian lizard, Subdoluseps pruthi, is named after him.
