= Western slender bluetongue =

Conservation status
- Least Concern (IUCN 3.1)

Scientific classification
- Kingdom: Animalia
- Phylum: Chordata
- Class: Reptilia
- Order: Squamata
- Family: Scincidae
- Genus: Cyclodomorphus
- Species: C. celatus

Binomial name
- Cyclodomorphus celatus Shea & Miller, 1995
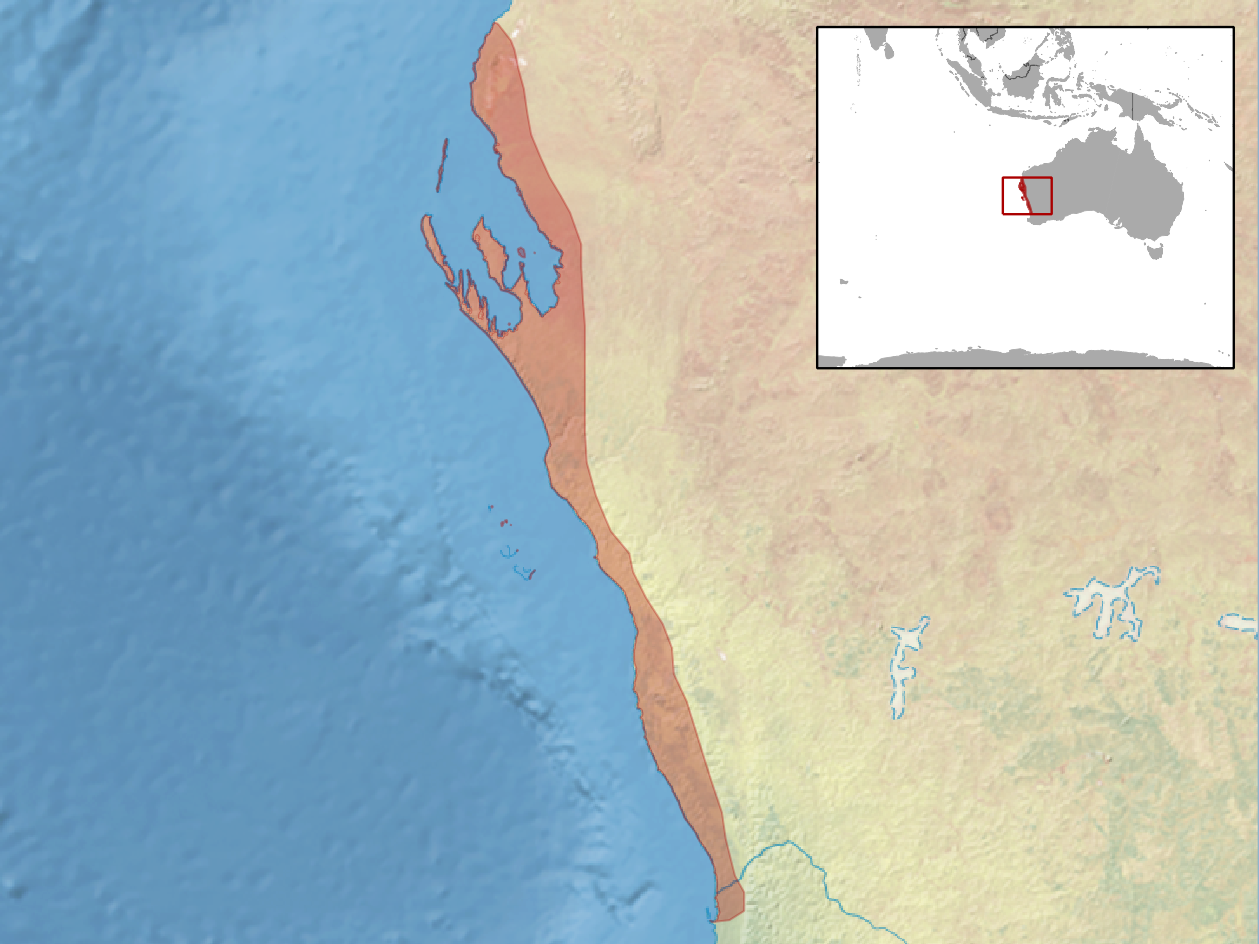
- Distribution in Western Australia

Species of lizard

The western slender bluetongue (Cyclodomorphus celatus) is a species of lizard in the family Scincidae. The species is endemic to the lower west coast and adjacent areas of Western Australia, including many offshore islands.

== Reproduction ==
The spermatogenic activity of the Western slender bluetongue reaches a peak in October. Mating and fertilization also peak in October. Young are born in January after approximately three months of pregnancy.
