= Mahadeva Subramania Mani =

Indian entomologist

Mahadeva Subramania Mani aka Dr MS Mani (Tamil: மகாதேவா சுப்ரமணிய கரங்கள்; 2 March 1908 in Tanjore, Tamil Nadu – 8 January 2003 in Bangalore) was an Indian entomologist known for his studies on high altitude entomology.

== Early life and career ==
Early school records and the University of Madras, MA Degree certificate show his name as M. Subramanya. Later on, sometime early during his service career, he recorded his name as Mahadev Subra Mani a.k.a. Mahadeva Subra Mani a.k.a. M. S. Mani.

He had his early education at K. S. High School, Tanjore, and passed his SSLC Examination in 1926. He then attended the Government College, Coimbatore, and passed the Intermediate Examination, in 1928. Later he went to medical studies just for one year in 1929, at Madras Medical College, and had to suspend further medical education due to financial constraints. In 1937, he obtained an M.A. degree, awarded by the University of Madras, on the basis of his research papers in entomology, and finally, on the strength of his extensive scientific research, he was awarded by Agra University, D.Sc. in 1947, a degree of a Doctor of Science. The chancellor was the late Ms. Sarojini Naidu, the then-governor of United Provinces, (Uttar Pradesh).

On 15 January 1933, he migrated to Calcutta to seek employment and build his career. He then joined Bangabasi College, Sealdah, Calcutta, as a part-time demonstrator and tutor for physics and earned a salary of Rs. 10/- per month. During this period he collaborated with Sir C. V. Raman on insect coloration. He worked at the Indian Museum and also as an honorary Research student at the Zoological Survey of India, Calcutta. He later on (1937) joined as a research assistant to Imperial Entomologist, Imperial Agricultural Research Institute, Pusa, Delhi, and a position from which he resigned in 1944. He worked with Dr. Hem Singh Pruthi at Pusa, and Dr. Birbal Sahni, then at Lucknow, who recognising the pioneering work in scientific research, and strongly proposed M. S. Mani's membership to the Royal Society, England. He was denied promotion while his ‘junior’ was promoted and hence he chose to seek his future elsewhere and resigned. He remained unemployed for some time; he earned a living by working as an interpreter and German language translator, during World War II, in the Censor Section of the Army H.Q., New Delhi, translating for the British Indian Army, 'official ' documents captured from the Germans. He would monitor radio broadcasts from Berlin and provide English transcripts. He also translated German language technical journals and scientific reports. As a matter of fact, he provided the English version of the German technology, for manufacturing hydrogenated oil ['Vanaspati'] in India to the founder of the manufacturing plant at Modinagar.

He left Delhi and joined as a lecturer in 1945, the teaching faculty of the department of zoology, St. John's College, Agra; during his long stint at St. John's College, he pioneered and established the school of entomology in 1950, established a benchmark scientific excellence, where he became the professor of zoology and entomology and appointed as the head of the department for zoology, succeeding Prof. Lalit Prasad Mathur, who took over as the registrar, Agra University. In recognition of his scientific output, both in quality and quantity, he was honoured by the University of Agra and awarded a D.Sc. degree, Doctor of Science. He pioneered fundamental research in entomology and received support from the highest levels and the University Grants Commission, eminent persons like Dr. Radhakrishnan, Zakir Hussein, etc., and established the School of Entomology in 1950, in the Campus of St. John's College, Agra.

From here he made many scientific expeditions to the Himalayas resulting in pioneering contributions to High Altitude Entomology. He later made studies in the Pamir and Caucasus ranges leading to his work on Bio-geography in India. The University of Agra awarded him a DSc degree in 1947 for his thesis submitted in 12 volumes.

In 1956, he joined the ZSI as deputy director and retired as officiating director in 1968. In 1968 he returned to his first love, Scientific Research, and became emeritus professor, at the school of entomology, St. John's College, Agra, and continued with his research work till 1984. He then finally left St. John's College and shifted to Madras, briefly worked with ZSI and since 1990 he was the emeritus professor at the botany department at Presidency College, Madras and continued as a guide for Ph.D. research students, till 15 May 2002 when he moved to live temporarily, in Hyderabad, with his late sister Janaki's grandson, Jyotirmay Sharma, Editor, Times of India, Hyderabad. He then moved to Bangalore on 14 September 2002 to live with his only daughter, Mrs. Prema Subramanian, and her husband V. S. Subramanian.

== Scientific works ==
His published work includes over 250 original research papers, and over 34 textbooks including his pioneering magnum opus, Ecology of Plant Galls.

His outstanding research work has been on the taxonomy of parasitic Hymenoptera (Chalcidoidea and Proctotrupoidea), gall midges (Itonididae: Diptera), and ecology and histogenesis of plant galls. He is remembered most for his pioneering work in high-altitude entomology. He led the first three entomological expeditions to the North West Himalayas in 1954, 1955, and 1956 and brought back a large collection of insects.

He published several books like High Altitude Entomology, Ecology and Biogeography of India etc. He led a team of Indian scientists to the Soviet Union to conduct jointly a research project in 1963 and represented India in the UNESCO programme on Man and Biosphere (MAB) at Oslo, Norway. He was fluent in written and spoken German, well read in Sanskrit, he also had a keen interest in Dutch, French, and Russian languages.

Entomological Survey of the Himalaya, Alai-Pamir, Tien Shan, Kun Lun, Caucasus, etc. His love of the mountains had begun as far back as 1950, when he went to the Nilgiris, Marudamalai Mountains with his son Visvanath; this was followed by similar visits to the mountains in north India, Dehra Dun 1950, Mussoorie/Chakrata 1952, Nainital, Garhwal Himalaya, (Hartola, 1952), Punjab / Himachal Himalaya, (Dhaula Dhar Range, 1953) and to Kullu, Manali region leading to the three pioneering expeditions, in 1954, 1955 and 1956, beyond the Pir Panjal Range, to the inner or Great Himalayan Range, in Lahaul & Spiti regions. He also extensively trekked and went on insect collection work in the mountain regions, Alai-Pamir, Tien Shan, Kun Lun, Caucasus, the Urals, etc., of the former USSR, during his official tour in 1963, as the leader of the Indian team; he traveled extensively to various scientific institutes, at Moscow, Tbilisi, Leningrad, Kyiv, Baku, Alma Ata, Samarkand, Tashkent etc. He also visited Oslo, in Norway on a similar invitation. He was a visiting professor at Tribhuvan University, Kathmandu, Nepal. He went on an insect collection trip, to the Pacific islands, of Fiji, and conducted a field trip off Vanua Levu, in the area of Taveuni island, across the International Dateline. He trained Visvanath to work with his students, who accompanied him on most field collection expeditions and taught him methods of preparing slides, mounting insect specimens, and proofreading Research papers. His first son, Visvanath was his constant companion on his mountain trails, starting with the first time at Mardamalai in 1950. Visvanath went on to trek in Sikkim, Bhutan in 1965 and climb on his own in the Kulti Nala glacier and Inner Himalayan Range of Spiti, in 1967.

== Positions held ==
1. 1933-37 Honorary Research Worker, Zoological Survey of India, Calcutta.
2. 1937 - 1945 Research Assistant, Entomological Section, Imperial Agricultural Research Institute, (IARI), Pusa, New Delhi.
3. 1945 - 1956 Professor of Zoology & Entomology, School of Entomology, St. John's College, Agra.
4. 1956 - 1968 Zoological Survey of India, Calcutta. (Retired as Director)
5. 1968 - 1982 Emeritus Professor, School of Entomology, St. John's College, Agra.
6. 1984 - 1990 ZSI, Madras
7. 1991 - 8 January 2003 Professor Emeritus, Presidency College, Madras.
- CSIR. 1968 - 70. Scheme on torrential stream Insects of the glacial zone of the Northwest Himalaya.
- PL 480. 1970 - 71. Project on Taxonomy of Chalcidoidea from India.
- PL -480. Project on Taxonomy of Proctotrupoidea.
- MAB(Man and Biosphere)Project - Project on the pre-impact Survey of Aquatic Insect Communities of the River Beas before the completion of the Beas-Sutlej Link Project.
- DST - 1981 - 86. Project on Ecology and Taxonomy of Chalcidoid and other parasites of the Teak / Sal forest ecosystem.
- Eastern Ghats 1985 - 88 Insect Survey Project.
- DOEN - Project on Butterfly Pollination.

== Publications ==
- Introduction to High Altitude Entomology, London, Methuen & Co. 1962 Cat.No. 2/6448/10
- Ecology of Plant Galls, The Hague, Dr. W. Junk Publishers. 1964
- Ecology and Biogeography of High Altitude Insects, The Hague, Dr. W. Junk Publishers.1968
- Beetles of the Himalaya, Calcutta, Thacker Spink. 1967
- Ecology and Biogeography in India, The Hague, Dr. W. Junk Publishers, 1974 ISBN 90 6193 075 8.
- Plant Galls of India, Madras, McMillan & Co. 1974
- Ecology and Phytogeography of High Altitude Plants of the Northwest Himalaya, London: Chapman & Hall. New York: John Wiley; New Delhi: Oxford & IBH 1978. ISBN 0 412 15710 1
- Ecology of Highlands, The Hague, Dr. W. Junk Publishers 1980. In collaboration with Dr. L.E.Giddings, Mexico. ISBN 90 6193 093 6
- L'Himalaya - Un Misterioso e inaccessibile Montagne, Milan. Libri Fabri, 1980.
- General Entomology, New Delhi, Oxford & IBH. 3rd & enlarged edition 1982.
- Butterflies of the Himalaya, The Hague, Dr. W. Junk Publishers, 1985
- Fundamentals of High Altitude Biology, New Delhi, Oxford & IBH, 2nd, edition, 1990 ISBN 81-204-0493-9
- Pollination Ecology in Compositae. Ind. Rev. Life Sci. 13: 174-190
- Himalayan Flowers, Bangkok Craftsman Press, 1993 ISBN 974-7315-63-7
- Insects, New Delhi, National Book Trust of India, Revised edition 1994.
- Pollination Ecology and Evolution in Compositae, Science Publishers Inc. USA and New Delhi, Oxford & IBH. 1999.
- Plant Galls of India, Science Publishers Inc. USA. 2nd revised & enlarged edition, August, 2000.
- Introduction to Zoology, New Delhi, Malhotra Bros. 1950. (Five Editions)
- Introduction to Entomology, Agra, Agra University Press, 1955.
- Heredity & Evolution, Bangalore, The PTI Book Depot, 1963.
- Heredity & Evolution, New Delhi, Oxford & IBH Publishing Co. 1977
- Insects, New Delhi, National Book Trust. 1971.
- Your Face from Fish to Man, Bangalore, The PTI Book depot, 1960.
- General Entomology, New Delhi, Oxford & IBH, 1968, 1973, 3rd. edition 1982.
- D'ABREU'S The Beetles of the Himalaya, Calcutta, Thacker Spink, 1967.
- Himalayan Flowers, produced by Prof. T.C.Majupuria, Tribhuvan University, Kathmandu, Nepal.
- Modern Classification of Insects, Agra, Satish Book Enterprise, 1974.
- Insects, New Delhi, National Book Trust, 1971, 1977
- Biogeography in India, Dehra Dun, Surya Publications, 1995. ISBN 81-85276-41-2
- Butterflies of the Himalaya, New Delhi, Oxford & IBH, 1986.
- Ecology & Evolution, Agra, Satish Book Enterprise, 1983.
- The Fauna of India & the adjacent countries, Part I & II, Calcutta, Zoological Survey of India, 1989.
- Indian Insects, Agra, Satish Book Enterprises. 1989.
- Progress in Invertebrate Zoology Hyderabad, Orient Longman Pvt Ltd, 2004, co-authored with Mrs Vasanti Hegde. ISBN 81 250 0841 1

== Citations to reliable sources-Named References ==
- Gordon Alexander, Dept of Biology, Univ of Colorado, Boulder, CO 80302-Entomological News, Vol 82,279-280, 1971.
- Ipe M Ipe & Agnes S Ipe, The Story of St John's College, Agra, India "The Truth shall make you free"-Chapter 7-The School of Entomology (established by Prof Dr M.S. Mani in 1950) Publisher Partridge Publishing, 2015 ISBN 1482858444, 9781482858440
- Cherian, P. T. 2003. Obituary. Current Science Vol 84 No 8 25 April 2003 Pages 1146-1147 PDF
- Dr Virendra K Gupta-Obituary notice-Dr MS Mani-Oriental Insects-Vol 37, 2003 (Associated Publishers, PO Box 140103, Gainesville Florida 3214-0103) http://www.mapress.com/AP/
- Dr Anantanarayanan Raman & Dr Virendra K Gupta-Oriental Insects-Vol 41, Preface, 2007 (Associated Publishers, PO Box 140103, Gainesville Florida 3214-0103) http://www.mapress.com/AP/
- Dr Anantanarayanan Raman & Dr Virendra K Gupta-Dedication-Oriental Insects-Vol 41, 1-4, 2007 (Associated Publishers, PO Box 140103, Gainesville Florida 3214-0103) http://www.mapress.com/AP/
- Dr TN Ananthakrishnan-Prof M.S.Mani-The Man, scientist, and philosopher-Oriental Insects-Vol 41, 5-7, 2007 (Associated Publishers, PO Box 140103, Gainesville Florida 3214-0103) http://www.mapress.com/AP/
- Dr. TN Anantha Krishnan - Prof. M.S. Mani https://www.tandfonline.com/doi/abs/10.1080/00305316.2007.10417495
- Dr. M.S. Mani - Ecology and Biogeography of High Altitude Insects https://www.springer.com/gp/book/9789061931140
- Mahadeva Subramania Mani – The Indian Entomologist Known For His Exemplary Studies On High Altitude Entomology https://www.beaninspirer.com/mahadeva-subramania-mani-the-indian-entomologist-known-for-his-exemplary-studies-on-high-altitude-entomology/
- Contributions of Dr. M.S.Mani to the field of Entomology-Jabez Battu & Somala Karthik- https://www.researchgate.net/publication/350823318_Contributions_of_Dr_MS_Mani_to_the_Field_of_Entomology

== Other sources ==
The family of Dr M.S.Mani
