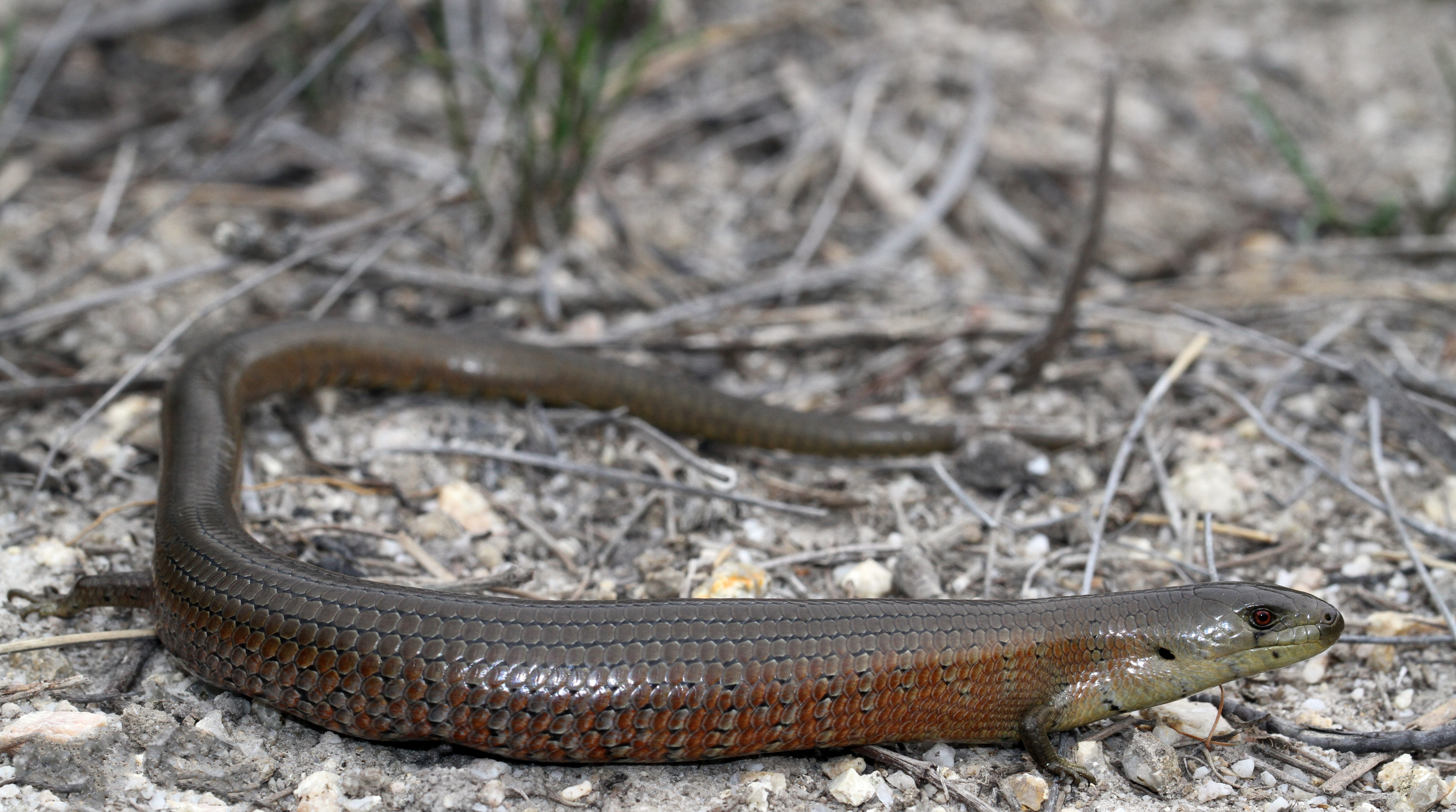

Conservation status
- Least Concern (IUCN 3.1)

Scientific classification
- Kingdom: Animalia
- Phylum: Chordata
- Class: Reptilia
- Order: Squamata
- Family: Scincidae
- Genus: Cyclodomorphus
- Species: C. michaeli

Binomial name
- Cyclodomorphus michaeli Wells & Wellington, 1984

= Mainland she-oak skink =

Species of lizard

The Mainland she-oak skink, also known as the Eastern she-oak skink (Cyclodomorphus michaeli) is a species of lizard in the family Scincidae which is endemic to eastern Australia. Its distribution extends from the New England region of New South Wales in the north to the Gippsland of Victoria in the south.
