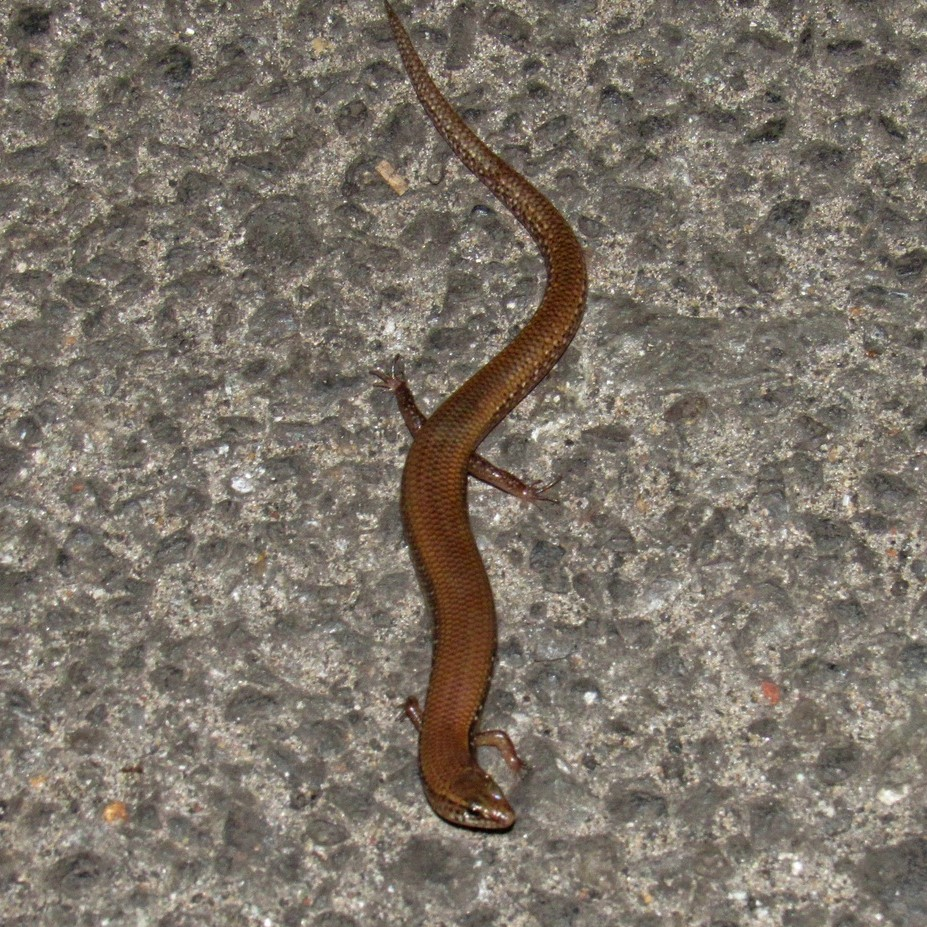

Conservation status
- Data Deficient (IUCN 3.1)

Scientific classification
- Kingdom: Animalia
- Phylum: Chordata
- Class: Reptilia
- Order: Squamata
- Family: Scincidae
- Genus: Dravidoseps
- Species: D. goaensis

Binomial name
- Dravidoseps goaensis (Sharma, 1976)

Synonyms
- Riopa goaensis Sharma, 1976; Lygosoma goaensis (Sharma, 1976)

= Dravidoseps goaensis =

Species of lizard

Dravidoseps goaensis is a species of skink found in India.
