= Giant slender bluetongue =

Conservation status
- Least Concern (IUCN 3.1)

Scientific classification
- Kingdom: Animalia
- Phylum: Chordata
- Class: Reptilia
- Order: Squamata
- Family: Scincidae
- Genus: Cyclodomorphus
- Species: C. maximus

Binomial name
- Cyclodomorphus maximus (Storr, 1976)

Species of lizard

The giant slender bluetongue (Cyclodomorphus maximus) is a species of lizard in the family Scincidae. The species is endemic to Western Australia.
