= Subdoluseps samajaya =

Scientific classification
- Kingdom: Animalia
- Phylum: Chordata
- Class: Reptilia
- Order: Squamata
- Family: Scincidae
- Genus: Subdoluseps
- Species: S. samajaya

Binomial name
- Subdoluseps samajaya Karin, Freitas, Shonleben, Grismer, Bauer, & Das, 2018

Species of skink found in Malaysia

Subdoluseps samajaya is a species of skink found in Sarawak, Borneo (Malaysia).
