= Lamprolepis leucosticta =

Scientific classification
- Kingdom: Animalia
- Phylum: Chordata
- Class: Reptilia
- Order: Squamata
- Family: Scincidae
- Genus: Lamprolepis
- Species: L. leucosticta

Binomial name
- Lamprolepis leucosticta (Müller, 1923)

Species of lizard

The white-spotted tree skink (Lamprolepis leucosticta) is a species of skink known only from West Java, Indonesia. It is an uncommon arboreal species.
