= Subdoluseps malayana =

Scientific classification
- Kingdom: Animalia
- Phylum: Chordata
- Class: Reptilia
- Order: Squamata
- Family: Scincidae
- Genus: Subdoluseps
- Species: S. malayana

Binomial name
- Subdoluseps malayana Grismer, Dzukafly, Muin, Quah, Karin, Anuar, & Freitas, 2019

Species of skink found in Malaysia

Subdoluseps malayana is a species of skink found in Malaysia.
