= Subdoluseps vietnamensis =

Scientific classification
- Kingdom: Animalia
- Phylum: Chordata
- Class: Reptilia
- Order: Squamata
- Family: Scincidae
- Genus: Subdoluseps
- Species: S. vietnamensis

Binomial name
- Subdoluseps vietnamensis Le, Nguyen, Phan, Rujirawan, Aowphol, Vo, Murphy, & Nguyen, 2021

Species of lizard

The Vietnam agile skink (Subdoluseps vietnamensis) is a species of skink found in Vietnam.
