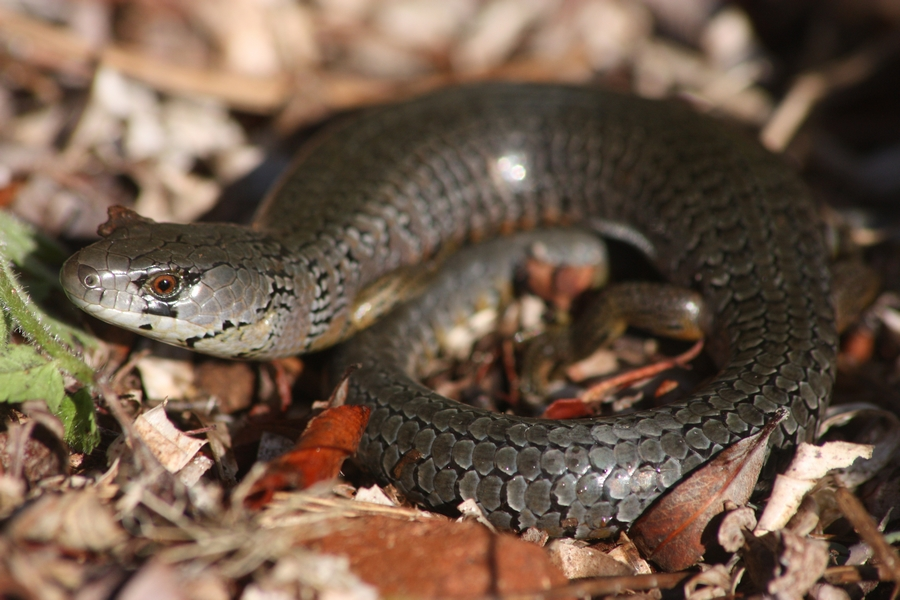
- She-oak skink (Cyclodomorphus casuarinae)

Scientific classification
- Kingdom: Animalia
- Phylum: Chordata
- Class: Reptilia
- Order: Squamata
- Family: Scincidae
- Subfamily: Egerniinae
- Genus: Cyclodomorphus; Fitzinger, 1843

Type species
- Cyclodus casuarinae Duméril and Bibron, 1839

Species
- 9, see text.

= Cyclodomorphus =

Genus of lizards

Cyclodomorphus is a genus of small to medium-sized skinks (family Scincidae). It belongs to the Egernia group which also includes the blue-tongued skinks (Austin & Arnold 2006).

== Species ==
Image	Scientific name	Common name	Distribution
	Cyclodomorphus branchialis (Günther, 1867)	common slender bluetongue, Gunther's skink	Australia.
	Cyclodomorphus casuarinae (Duméril & Bibron, 1839)	Tasmanian she-oak skink, she-oak skink	Tasmania, Australia.
	Cyclodomorphus celatus Shea & Miller, 1995	western slender blue-tongue	Western Australia
	Cyclodomorphus gerrardii (JE Gray, 1845)	pink-tongued skink, pink-tongued lizard	Australia
	Cyclodomorphus maximus (Storr, 1976)	giant slender bluetongue	Western Australia.
	Cyclodomorphus melanops (Stirling & Zietz, 1893)	Samphire slender bluetongue	Australia.
	Cyclodomorphus michaeli Wells & Wellington, 1984	mainland she-oak skink, eastern she-oak skink	Australia (New South Wales south to eastern Victoria)
	Cyclodomorphus praealtus Shea, 1995	alpine she-oak skink, alpine she-oak slender bluetongue	Australia
	Cyclodomorphus venustus Shea & Miller, 1995	slender bluetongue	eastern Australia.

== See also ==
- Hemisphaeriodon
