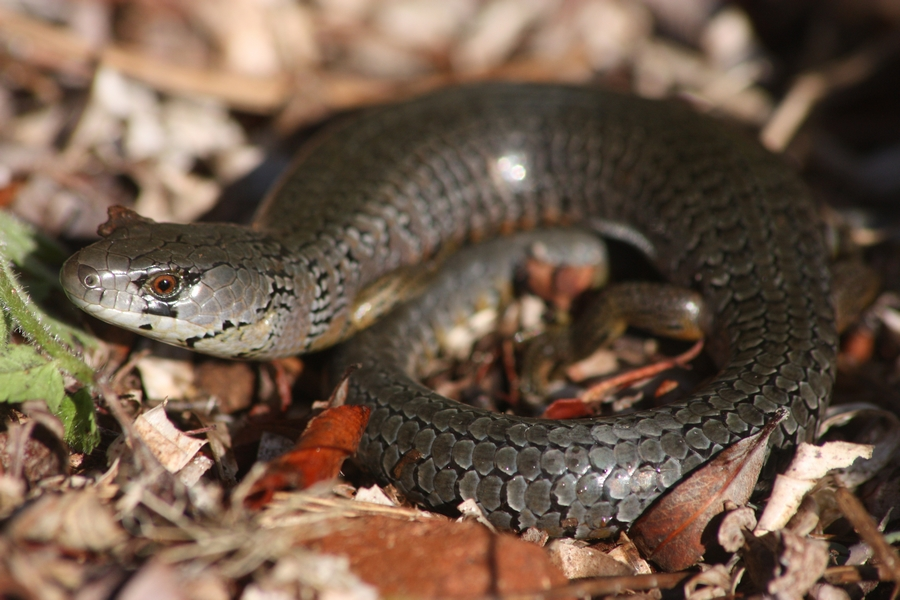
- A she-oak skink in a garden in Bicheno, Tasmania

Conservation status
- Least Concern (IUCN 3.1)

Scientific classification
- Kingdom: Animalia
- Phylum: Chordata
- Class: Reptilia
- Order: Squamata
- Family: Scincidae
- Genus: Cyclodomorphus
- Species: C. casuarinae

Binomial name
- Cyclodomorphus casuarinae (Duméril and Bibron, 1839)

Synonyms
- Tiliqua casuarinae

= Tasmanian she-oak skink =

Species of lizard

The Tasmanian she-oak skink, also known simply as the she-oak skink (Cyclodomorphus casuarinae) is a large (up to about 30 cm total length), long-tailed (over 60% of body length), snake-like skink endemic to Tasmania, Australia. It is viviparous; mating in spring, and giving birth in late summer. It is related to the more robust blue-tongued skink, of the genus Tiliqua, and was previously known as Tiliqua casuarinae.
