= Common slender bluetongue =

Conservation status
- Near Threatened (IUCN 3.1)

Scientific classification
- Kingdom: Animalia
- Phylum: Chordata
- Class: Reptilia
- Order: Squamata
- Family: Scincidae
- Genus: Cyclodomorphus
- Species: C. branchialis

Binomial name
- Cyclodomorphus branchialis (Günther, 1867)

Species of lizard

The common slender bluetongue or Gunther's skink (Cyclodomorphus branchialis) is a species of lizard in the family Scincidae. The species is endemic to Australia.
