= Chitteri Hills =

Hill ranges in Tamil Nadu, India

Coordinates: 11°53′N 78°30′E

The Chitteri Hills, also known as Sitheri Hills, are one of the segments of the Eastern Ghats mountain range of Tamil Nadu, India. The hills form a compact block consisting of several hill ranges, and contain tangled ridges and ravines running in the northeast and southwest directions, enclosing many narrow valleys (rivers), viz. Kallar, Varattar, Kambalai and Anaimaduvu. They are spread over an area of 654.52 km^{2} within the geographical limit of 78°15’−78°45’E longitude and 11°44’−12°08’N latitude.

Topographically, the area is undulating with an altitude varying from 240 to 1266 m. The rocks on Chitteri hills are chiefly gneisses/granitic in composition. Soil is generally shallow and reddish-loam, varying in fertility and often mixed with gravel and boulders. Black soils are seldom found in the forests.

The minimum and maximum temperature of the area is 19 °C (in winter) and 40 °C (in summer) respectively. The annual rainfall varies from 620 to 900 mm and it received both northeast and southwest monsoons. The hills harbours various vegetation types such as evergreen, semi-evergreen, riparian, dry mixed deciduous, dry deciduous scrub and the southern thorn scrub forests.

== Train crashes ==
On the night of 13 September 2011, at least 10 people have been reported killed and more than 70 injured when a passenger train from Chennai rammed into a stationary train near Chitteri railway station.

On 11 April 2013, The Muzaffarpur-Yeswantpur Express train derailed around 6 am at Chitteri, Eleven coaches derailed in Tamil Nadu, killing one person and injuring 50 others. Six of these 50 people have suffered serious injuries.
