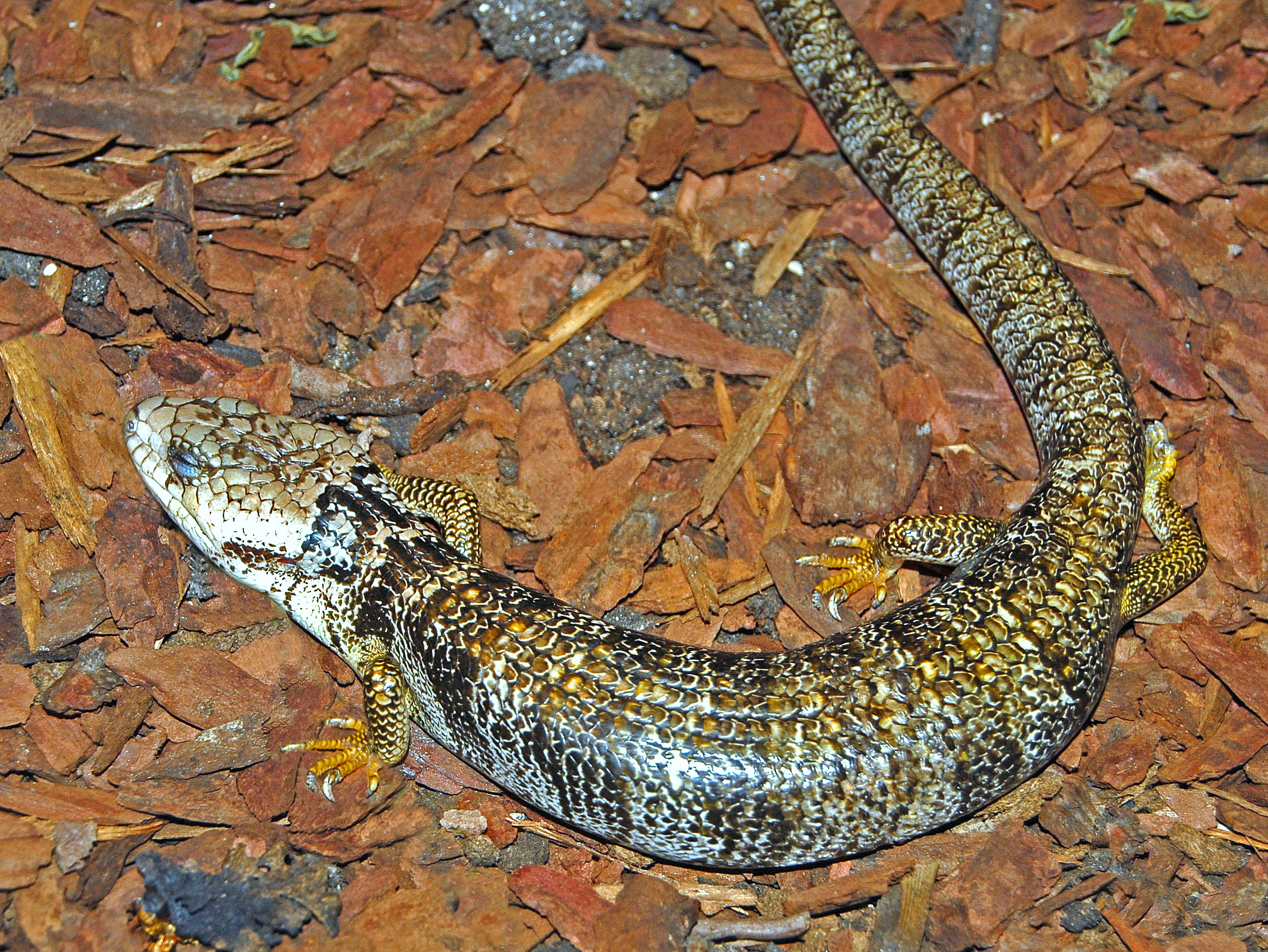

Conservation status
- Least Concern (IUCN 3.1)

Scientific classification
- Kingdom: Animalia
- Phylum: Chordata
- Class: Reptilia
- Order: Squamata
- Family: Scincidae
- Genus: Cyclodomorphus
- Species: C. gerrardii

Binomial name
- Cyclodomorphus gerrardii (Gray, 1845)

Synonyms
- Hinulia gerrardii Gray, 1845; Hemisphaeriodon gerrardii — W. Peters, 1867; Tiliqua gerrardii — Cogger, 1983; Cyclodomorphus gerrardii — Shea, 1990; Hemisphaeriodon gerrardi — Cogger, 2000; Cyclodomorphus gerrardi — Wilson & Swan, 2010

= Pink-tongued skink =

Species of lizard

The pink-tongued skink (Cyclodomorphus gerrardii) is a species of lizard in the family Scincidae. It is endemic to Australia, where it is also called commonly the pink-tongued lizard. As suggested by these common names, its distinguishing characteristic is a pink tongue as opposed to the blue tongue of lizards of the closely related genus Tiliqua.

== Etymology ==
The specific name, gerrardii, is in honor of British zoologist Edward Gerrard (1810–1910), who was Gray's "right-hand man" at the British Museum.

== Geographic range ==
C. gerrardii is endemic to Australia. It can be found from Springwood, New South Wales, along the eastern coastal country and eastern ranges to the Cairns Region, Queensland.

== Description ==
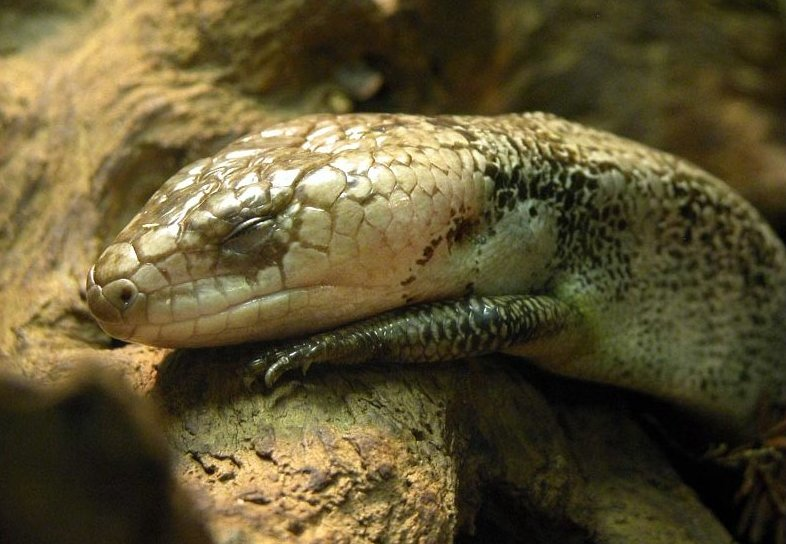
Close-up of the head

C. gerrardii is a relatively large lizard of up to 45 cm (18 in) total length (including tail). It has a slender body with a long, slender and slightly prehensile tail about the same length as the body. The limbs are well developed with long digits and sharp claws. The neck is well pronounced, and the head is relatively large, wider in males than in females. In adults the tongue is pink. C. gerrardii has a slate-grey to fawn dorsal ground colour with dark grey to brown or black cross bands. These bands are more pronounced in males and less so in females. There are about 20 cross bands from the neck to the tip of the tail, which run slightly backwards laterally. The ventral surfaces of C. gerrardii are white to pinkish or creamy brown and may be marbled on the cross bands. The scales are smooth and, on the head, edged with a darker colour. The tip of the snout is dark in adults with some darker spots on the head. The limbs are spotted or streaked darkly. All juveniles are marked with pronounced black cross bands on a very light grey ground colour. There are several dark spots on the head, especially under the eyes. The tip of the snout is light in colour and the tongue and mouth are blue. Similar species (Cogger 2000): C. gerrardii has been associated with the genus Tiliqua as well as the genus Cyclodomorphus due to their close relation (previous names: Cyclodomorphus gerrardii and Tiliqua gerrardii). C. gerrardii is very similar in appearance to the eastern blue-tongue, Tiliqua scincoides; however, C. gerrardii has, true to its common name, a pink tongue as an adult. It is also much more slender than T. scincoides, having a more slender body, a much longer and narrower tail as well as a smaller head. In addition, the limbs are more developed and longer than those of the blue-tongues.

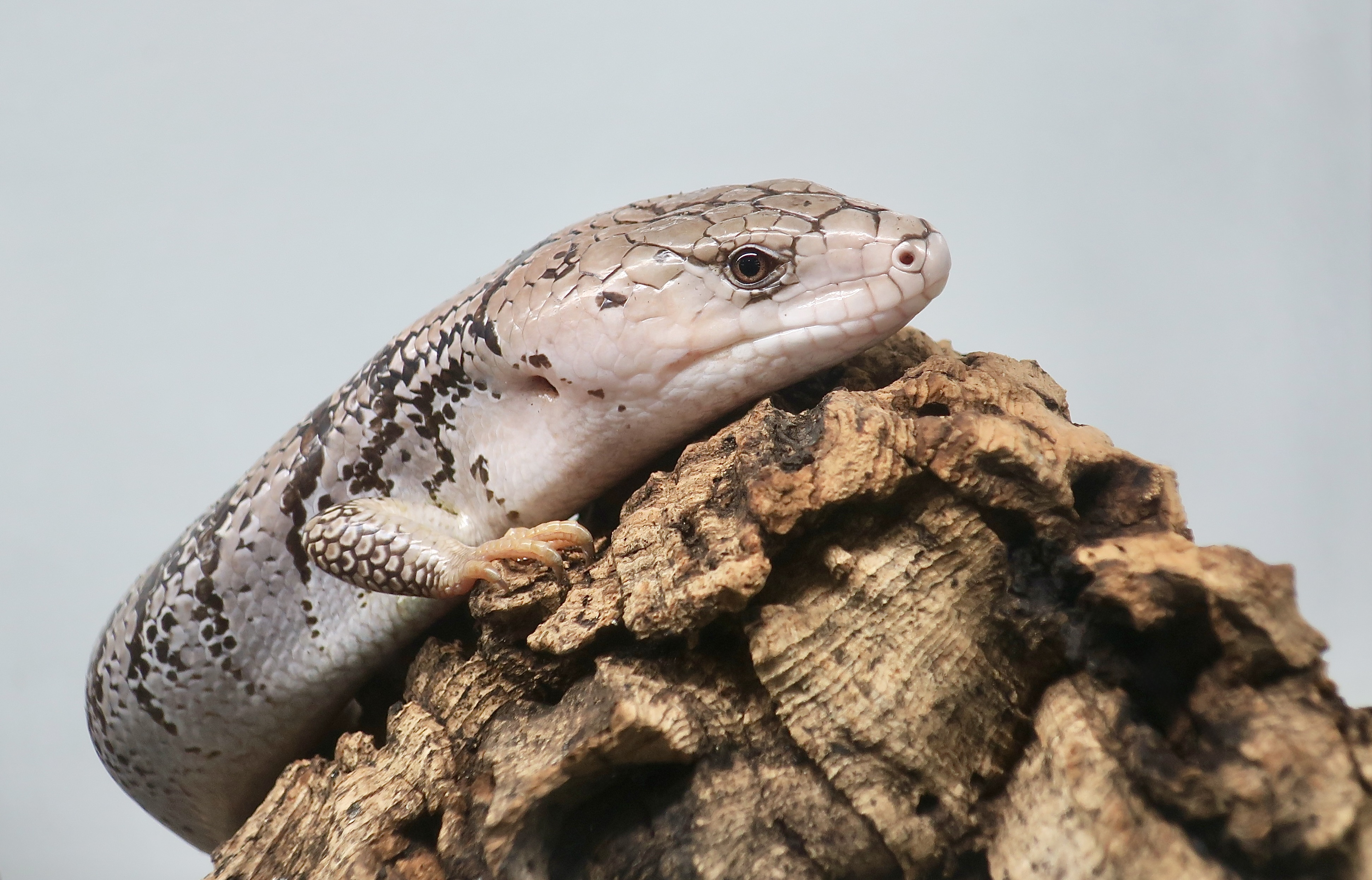
A pink-tongued skink posing at The Gecko Gallery NYC.

== Ecology and behaviour ==
C. gerrardii inhabits wet sclerophyll forests and rainforests as well as moist areas in woodlands. It shelters beneath leaf litter, in hollow logs, and in crevices of rocks and trees. Its slender body and limbs are an adaptation for moving in thick undergrowth. C. gerrardii moves with lateral undulations on smooth surfaces, but holds its hind limbs close to the body and moves its tail in a side-winding motion when moving through grass and when climbing on branches, using only the forelimbs. Its main diet consists of snails and slugs, for which it forages during twilight hours and at night in summer, and also during the day in cooler months. To crush the shells of snails, C. gerrardii uses its large and flattened teeth in the back of the upper and lower jaw. C. gerrardii is a good climber, using its semi-prehensile tail as a supporting aid and, although only partially arboreal, climbing trees to feed when necessary. The juveniles seem to climb vegetation more frequently to avoid predation. When threatened, C. gerrardii raises its body off the ground to appear larger, and flickers or vibrates its tongue rapidly similar to snakes.

== Breeding biology ==
In C. gerrardii courtship occurs in early spring for a period of six weeks, during which time males have been observed to fight. In mating, the male grasps the female's head with his jaws and mounts her. After an estimated gestation period of 101 to 110 days, females produce large litters of 20 to 30 (largest recorded: 67) live-young in early summer. During birth, the female holds her hind legs close to her body, as when moving through grass, giving single births about every 30 minutes during which she moves around. The young are born curled up in a foetal membrane, which they eat after breaking free. Immediately after birth, the young start flickering their tongues. The tongue and mouth are dark blue and the ventral surface is black in juveniles, changing to pink and mauve respectively after about three months. The young are independent from straight after birth without any parental care and start feeding on slugs and snails. Age at sexual maturity is about 22 months.
