= Dravidoseps nilgiriensis =

Scientific classification
- Kingdom: Animalia
- Phylum: Chordata
- Order: Squamata
- Family: Scincidae
- Genus: Dravidoseps
- Species: D. nilgiriensis

Binomial name
- Dravidoseps nilgiriensis (Ganesh, et al., 2021)

Synonyms
- Subdoluseps nilgiriensis Ganesh, et al., 2021

Species of lizard

The Nilgiri gracile skink (Dravidoseps nilgiriensis) is a species of skink found in Western Ghats ranges in the Nilgiri hills in Tamil Nadu, southern India.

== Description ==
Dravidoseps nilgiriensis can be identified by: slender, small-sized body (47–67 mm); sandy brown above, with each scale tipped with black; a thick black lateral band from snout to tail; a distinct white labial streak; dirty white venter, with throat having mild black striations; 28–29 midbody scale rows; 71–74 mid ventral scales; 66–69 paravertebral scales.

== Etymology ==
This species was named after its type locality - the Nilgiri hills, in the Western Ghats of southern India.

== Discovery ==
Dravidoseps nilgiriensis was discovered by scientists in the Anaikatti and Mulli hills of the Nilgiri district of Tamil Nadu, in a farmland surrounded by deciduous forests. First found in 2019, after many months of research it was named and described as new to science, in 2021.

== Natural history ==
Dravidoseps nilgiriensis is most likely a diurnal, insectivorous, skink that lives on dry leaf-litter in deciduous forest belts in mid-elevations (800 m) of these hills. These skinks were seen in marginally human-occupied areas as well, including the place where from they were first sighted. Nothing is known about its reproduction and other life-history traits.
