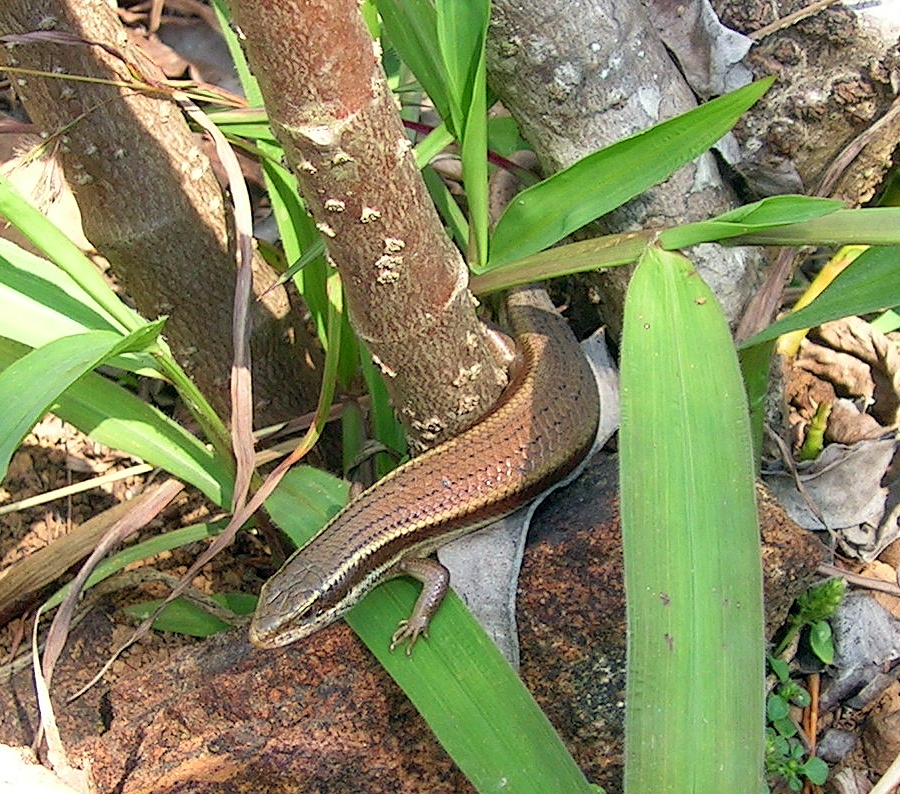
- Unidentified Eutropis species from Wayanad (Kerala, India)

Scientific classification
- Kingdom: Animalia
- Phylum: Chordata
- Class: Reptilia
- Order: Squamata
- Family: Scincidae
- Subfamily: Lygosominae; Mittleman, 1952

= Lygosominae =

Subfamily of lizards

Lygosominae is the largest subfamily of skinks in the family Scincidae. The subfamily can be divided into a number of genus groups. If the rarely used taxonomic rank of infrafamily is employed, the genus groups would be designated as such, but such a move would require a formal description according to the ICZN standards.

== Genera ==
Several Lygosominae genera were notorious "wastebin taxa" in the past, with scientists assigning more or less closely related species to them in a haphazard fashion and without verifying that the new species were close relatives of the genera's type species. What was once placed in Lygosoma, for example, is now divided among some 15 genera, not all in this subfamily. Similarly, Mabuya and Sphenomorphus are having species moved elsewhere.

- Haackgreerius (monotypic: endemic to coastal Somalia)
- Lamprolepis – tree skinks
- Lygosoma – writhing skinks
- Mochlus - African spp. (synonym Lepidothyris)
- Riopa
- Subdoluseps
- Dravidoseps

=== Now placed elsewhere ===
Egernia group
now Subfamily Egerniinae

- Corucia – Solomon Islands skink
- Cyclodomorphus
- Egernia – (paraphyletic: including Bellatorias, Liopholis and Lissolepis, which are better regarded as distinct)
- Tiliqua – blue-tongued skinks
- Tribolonotus – crocodile skinks

Eugongylus group
now Subfamily Eugongylinae

- Bassiana (= Acritoscincus) – "cool-skins"
- Carlia – four-fingered skinks
- Cryptoblepharus – snake-eyed skinks, shining-skinks
- Emoia – emoias
- Eugongylus – mastiff skinks, short-legged giant skinks
- Lampropholis – Indo-Australian ground skinks
- Leiolopisma
- Lobulia
- Niveoscincus – snow skinks, "cool-skins"
- Oligosoma
- Saproscincus – shade skinks

Mabuya group
now Subfamily Mabuyinae

- Chioninia – Cape Verde mabuyas (formerly in Mabuya)
- Dasia — Southeast Asian tree skinks, including Apterygodon (now considered to be part of Dasia)
- Eumecia — Central African elongated skinks
- Eutropis – Asian (formerly in Mabuya)
- Heremites — Mediterranean (North Africa and Middle Eastern species)
- Mabuya – American mabuyas
- Toenayar — composed of a single species in India/Indochina
- Trachylepis – Afro-Malagasy mabuyas (formerly in Mabuya)

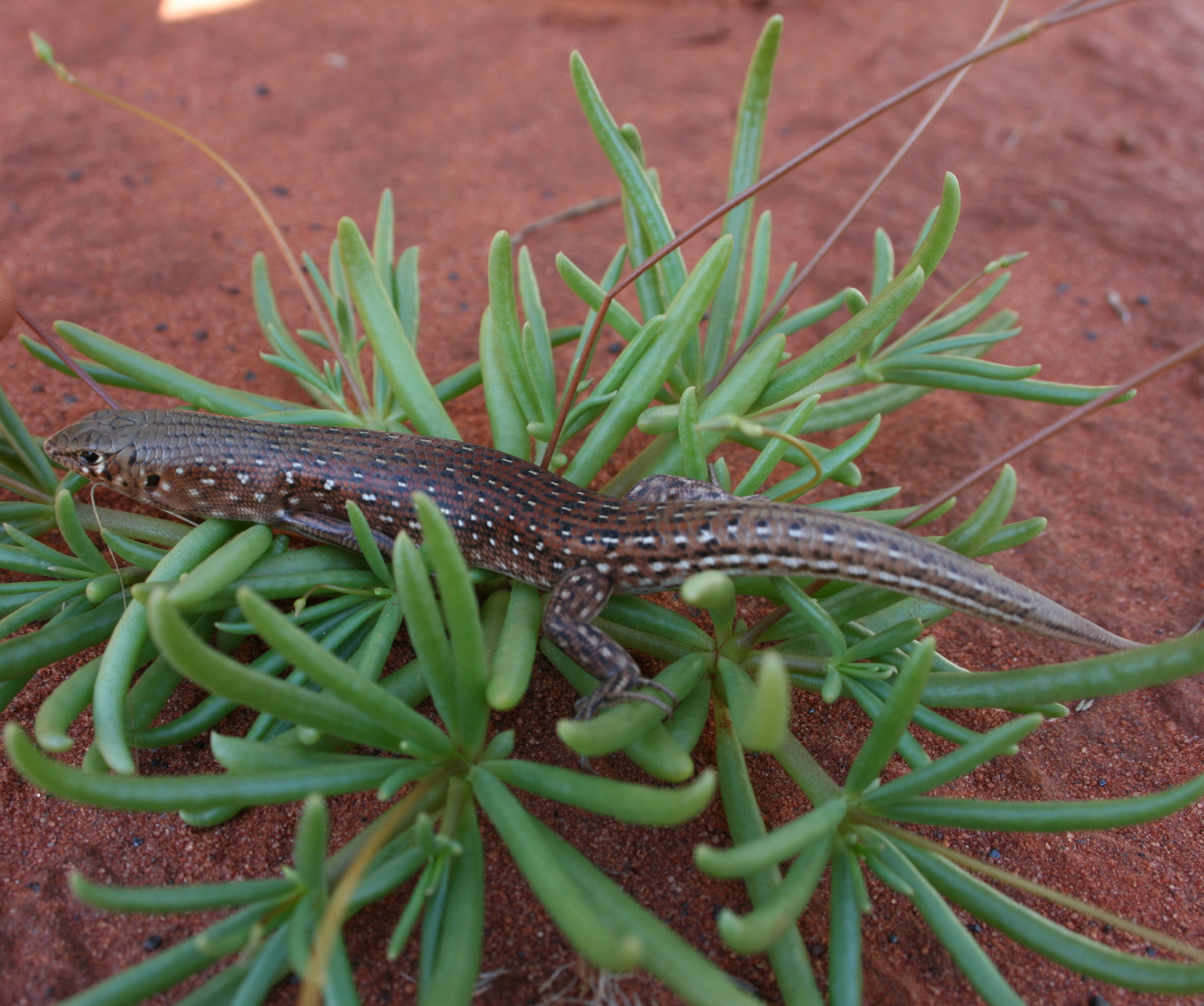
Ctenotus pantherinus ocellifer at Angas Downs

Sphenomorphus group
now in subfamily Sphenomorphinae

- Anomalopus – worm-skinks
- Ctenotus – comb-eared skinks
- Eulamprus – water skinks
- Eremiascincus
- Glaphyromorphus
- Gnypetoscincus – Prickly Skink
- Insulasaurus
- Lerista
- Lipinia – lipinias
- Otosaurus
- Parvoscincus
- Pinoyscincus
- Scincella – ground skinks
- Sphenomorphus – common skinks (paraphyletic)
- Tytthoscincus

=== Incertae sedis and obsolete genera ===
- Euprepis - obsolete genus
- Hemisphaeriodon – pink-tongued skinks
- "Hinulia elegans", described by Grey in 1838, is unidentified, but may be Eulamprus tenuis.
