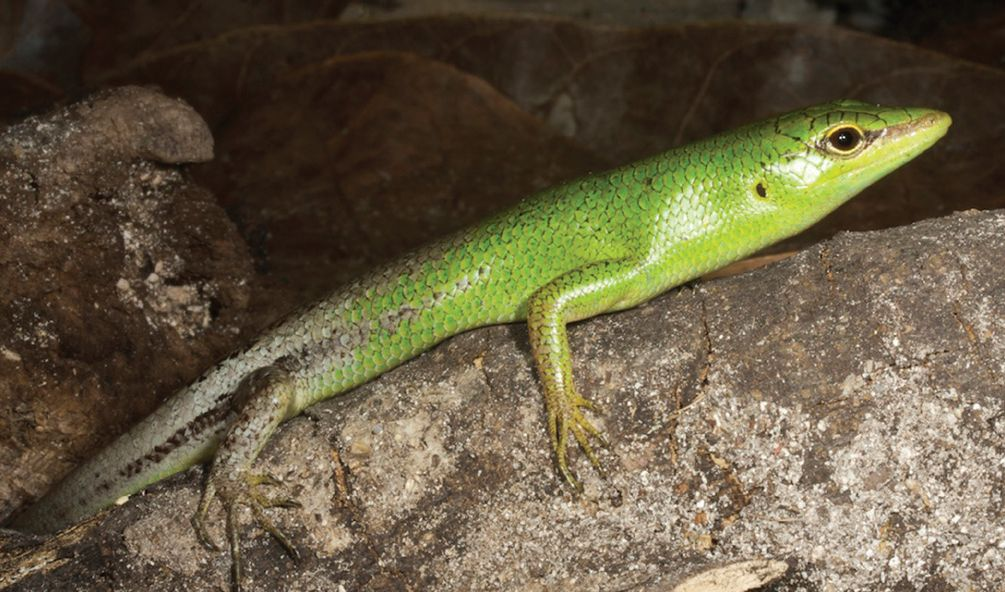
- Lamprolepis smaragdina

Scientific classification
- Kingdom: Animalia
- Phylum: Chordata
- Class: Reptilia
- Order: Squamata
- Family: Scincidae
- Subfamily: Lygosominae
- Genus: Lamprolepis; Fitzinger, 1843

= Lamprolepis =

Genus of lizards

Lamprolepis is a genus of lizards, known commonly as emerald skinks, in the subfamily Lygosominae of the family Scincidae. The genus Lygosoma is its closest genetic relative.

== Geographic distribution ==
Species of the genus Lamprolepis are found in Indonesia and Malaysia, and on islands in the western Pacific.

== Species ==
Three species are recognized as being valid.

| Image | Scientific name | Common name | Distribution |
|---|---|---|---|
| | Lamprolepis leucosticta (L. Müller, 1923) | white-spotted tree skink | West Java, Indonesia. |
| | Lamprolepis nieuwenhuisii (Lidth de Jeude, 1905) | Nieuwenhuis's skink | Borneo |
| | Lamprolepis smaragdina (Lesson, 1826) | emerald tree skink, green tree skink | Taiwan, Palawan, Luzon and Sulu archipelagoes in the Philippines, New Guinea |

Nota bene: A binomial authority in parentheses indicates that the species was originally described in a genus other than Lamprolepis.
