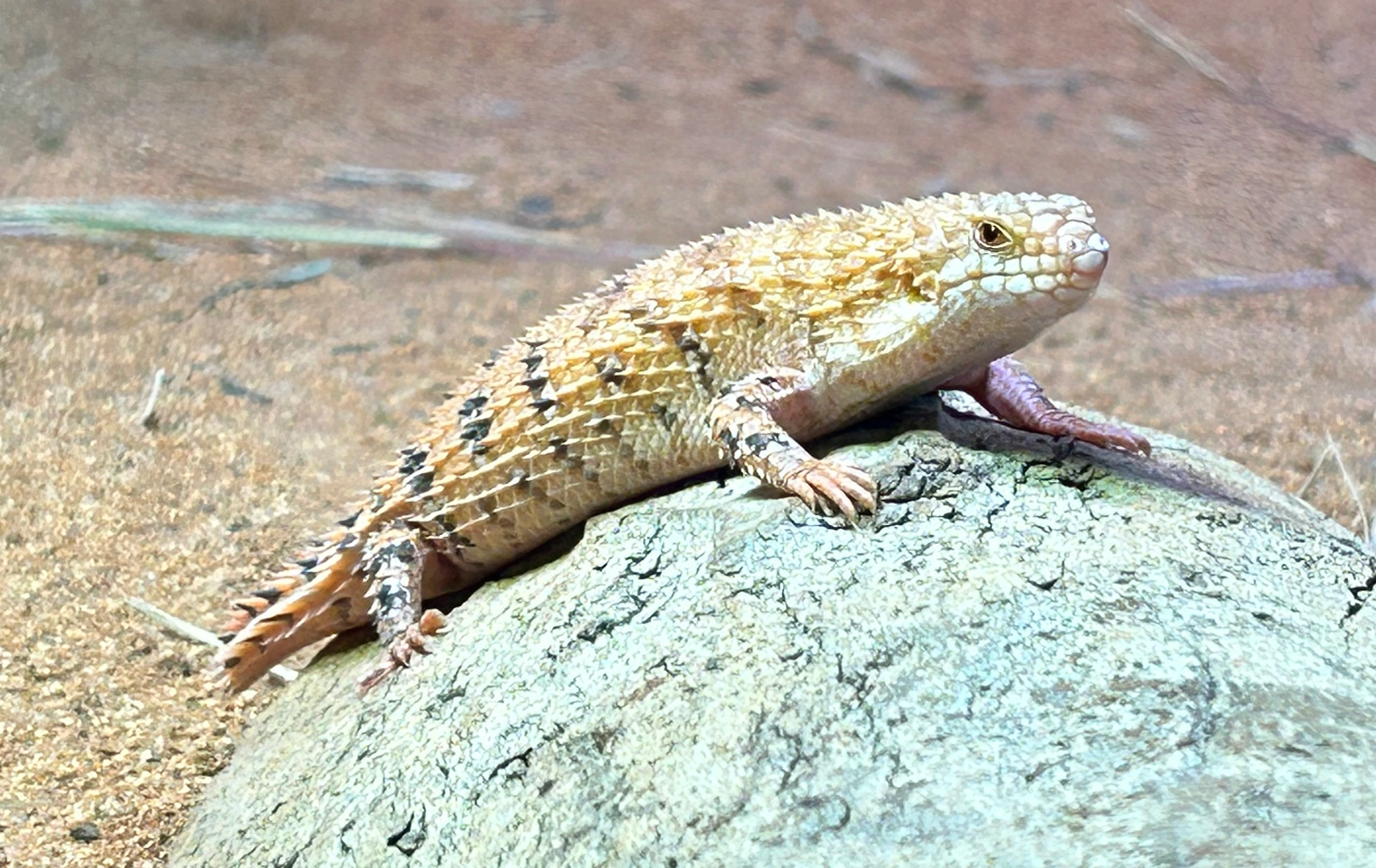

Conservation status
- Least Concern (IUCN 3.1)

Scientific classification
- Kingdom: Animalia
- Phylum: Chordata
- Class: Reptilia
- Order: Squamata
- Family: Scincidae
- Genus: Egernia
- Species: E. epsisolus

Binomial name
- Egernia epsisolus Doughty, Kealley & Donnellan, 2011

= Eastern Pilbara spiny-tailed skink =

Species of lizard

The Eastern Pilbara spiny-tailed skink (Egernia epsisolus) is a species of large skink, a lizard in the family Scincidae. The species is native to the Pilbara in northwestern Australia. Prior to 2011, it was considered to be the pygmy spiny-tailed skink.

== See also ==
- Egernia cygnitos
- Egernia depressa
