= Western Pilbara spiny-tailed skink =

Conservation status
- Least Concern (IUCN 3.1)

Scientific classification
- Kingdom: Animalia
- Phylum: Chordata
- Class: Reptilia
- Order: Squamata
- Family: Scincidae
- Genus: Egernia
- Species: E. cygnitos

Binomial name
- Egernia cygnitos Doughty, Kealley & Donnellan, 2011

Species of lizard

The Western Pilbara spiny-tailed skink (Egernia cygnitos) is a species of large skink in the family Scincidae. It is native to the Pilbara region in northwestern Australia. Prior to 2011, it was considered to be the pygmy spiny-tailed skink.

== Habitat ==
It is mostly found in and around rocky outcrops, where they live in cracks and crevices within the rocks.

== See also ==
- Egernia episcopus
- Egernia depressa
