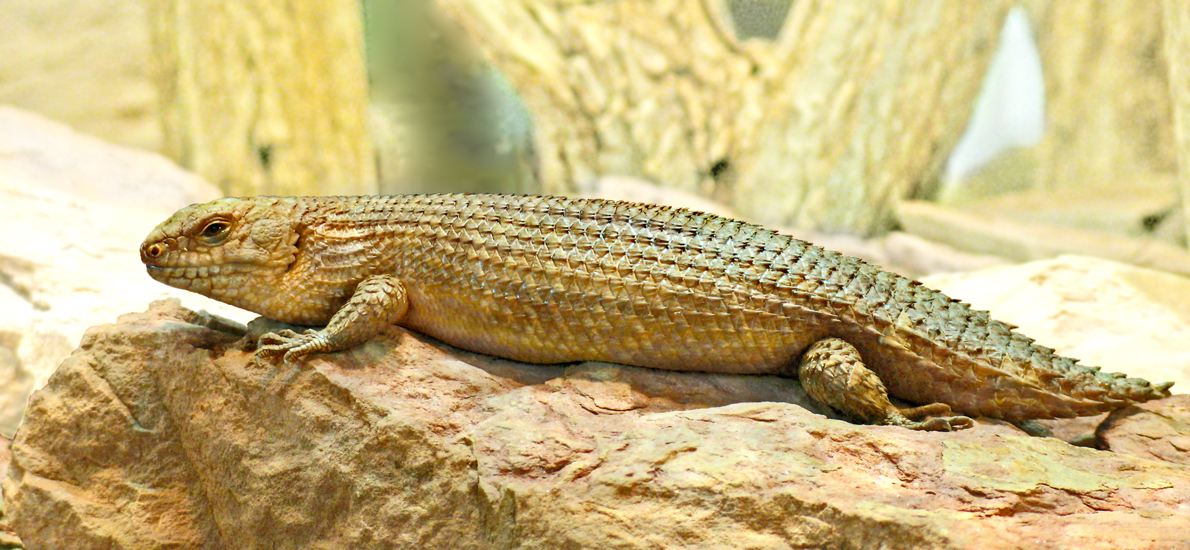

Conservation status
- Least Concern (IUCN 3.1)

Scientific classification
- Kingdom: Animalia
- Phylum: Chordata
- Class: Reptilia
- Order: Squamata
- Family: Scincidae
- Genus: Egernia
- Species: E. stokesii

Binomial name
- Egernia stokesii (Gray, 1845)
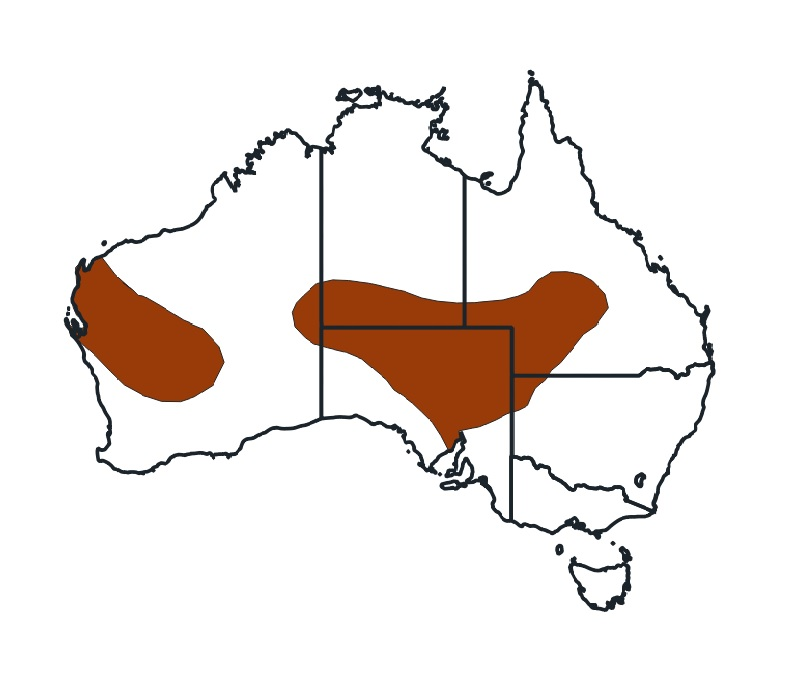
- Distribution map of Stokes's skink

Synonyms
- Silubosaurus stokesii Gray, 1845; Silubosaurus zellingi De Vis, 1884; Egernia stokesii — Glauert, 1960

= Stokes's skink =

Species of lizard

Egernia stokesii is a gregarious species of lizard of the Scincidae family. This diurnal species is endemic to Australia, and is also known as the Gidgee skink, spiny-tailed skink, Stokes's skink and Stokes's egernia. The species forms stable, long-term social aggregations, much like the social groups seen in mammalian and avian species. This characteristic is rarely found in the Squamata order, but is widespread within the Australian subfamily of Egerniinae skinks. Populations of E. stokesii are widely distributed, but fragmented, and occur in semi-arid environments. There are three recognised subspecies. The conservation status for the species is listed as least concern, however, one subspecies is listed as endangered.

== Description and ecology ==
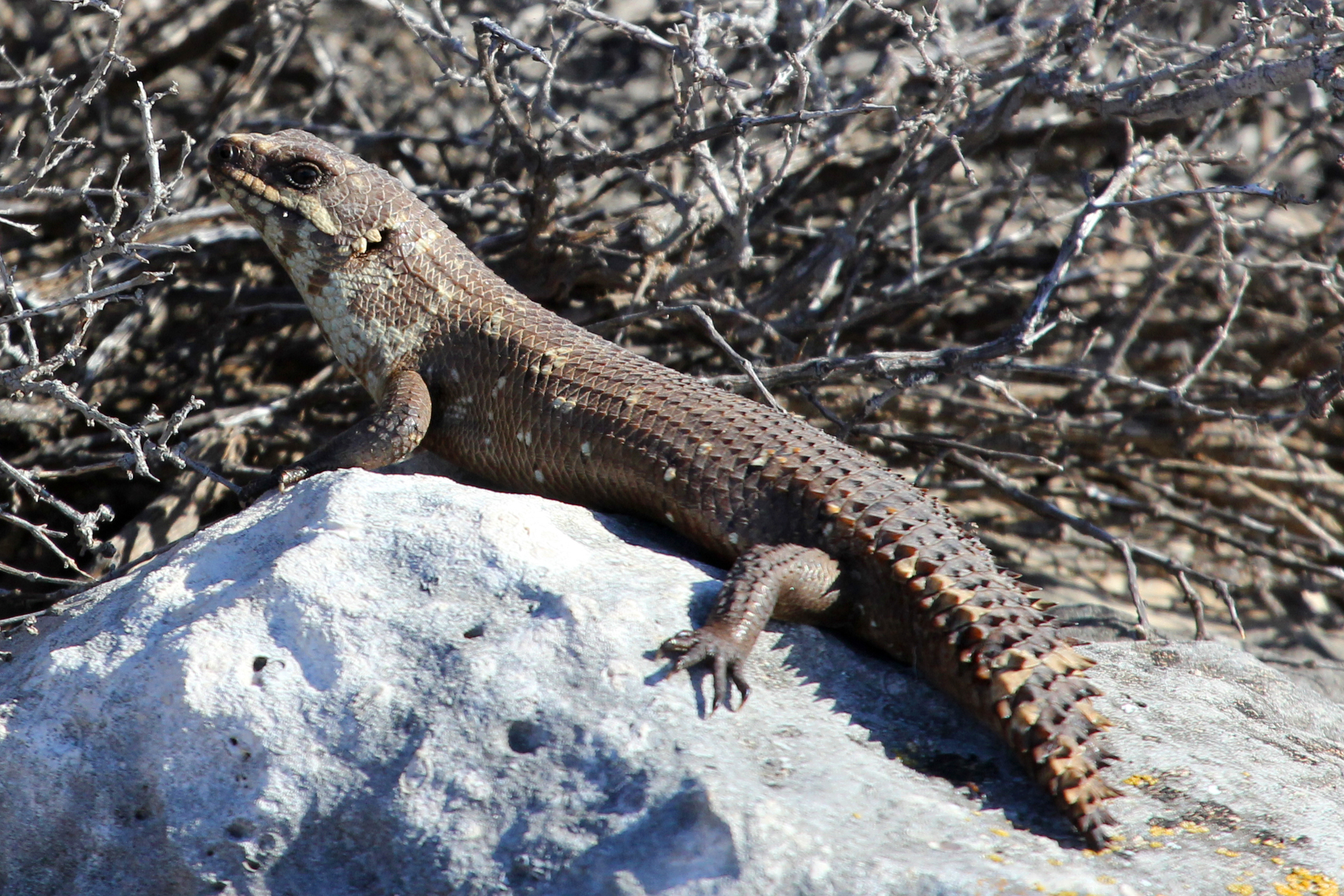
Stokes's skink basking on a rock, displaying scatterings of lighter coloured dorsal scales.

Egernia stokesii range in colour from olive to reddish brown, with lighter ventral scales that range from white to yellow. The species often displays scatterings of lighter coloured dorsal scales. The dorsal scales are keeled from the back of the neck to the tail and spiny tail scales are a prominent feature of the species. The tail is flattened rather than cylindrical, and shorter than the head and body of the animal, at approximately 35% of the snout to vent length. E. stokesii is unable to autotomize their tails. The snout to vent length of a mature adult is between 155 and 190mm. The species is slow to reach sexual maturity, generally between five and six years of age, with a lifespan between 10 and 25 years.

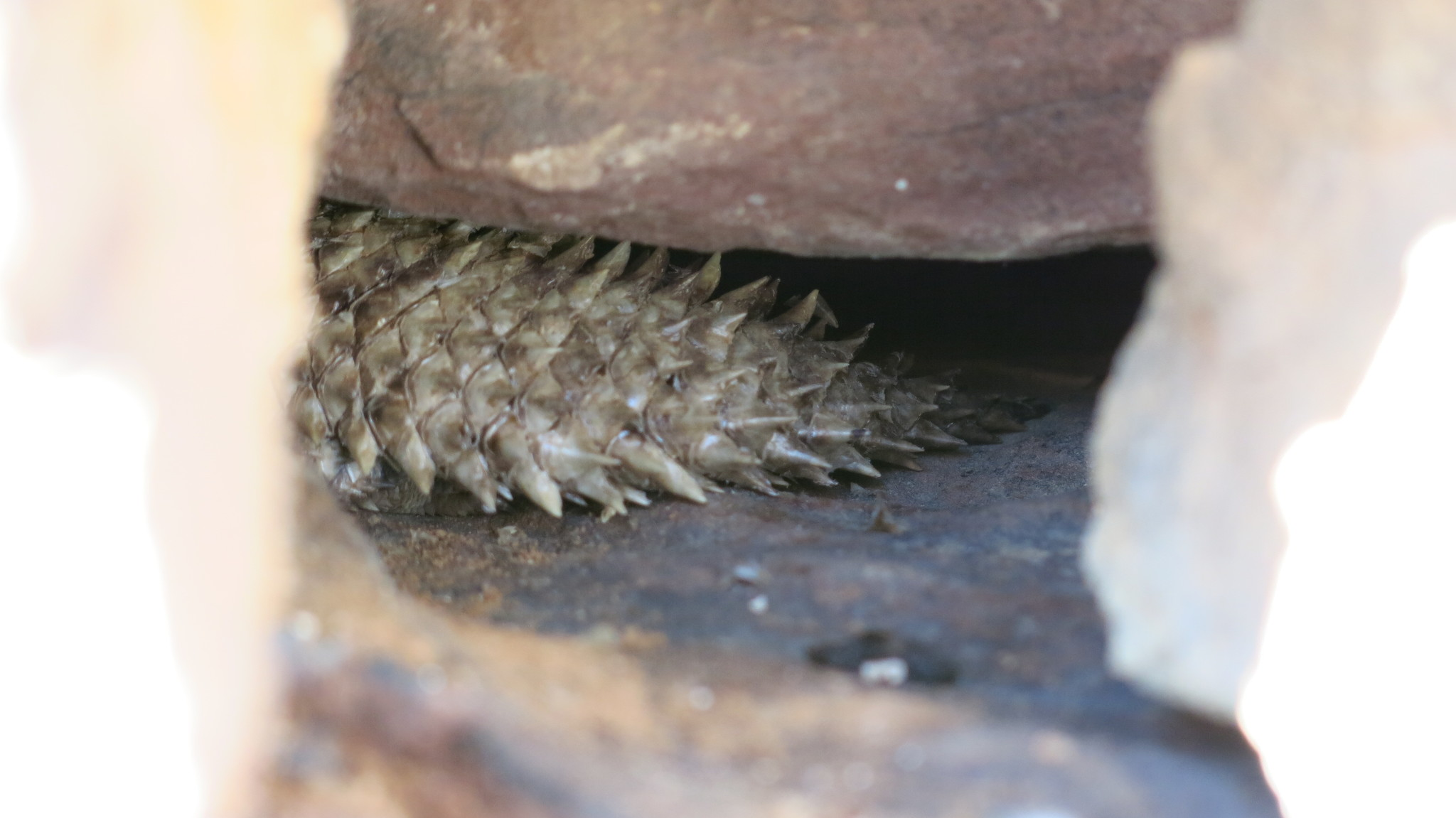
The characteristic spiny tail of Stokes's skink.

The species displays complex social organisation, forming social aggregations of up to 17 closely related individuals. It has been suggested complex social organisation in the species aids in the detection of predators and thermoregulation. These aggregations remain stable over time, with evidence of adult individuals remaining in the same social group for over five years. E. stokesii displays philopatry, with juveniles typically remaining within the natal group until maturity. The social aggregations typically consist of a breeding pair, immature juvenile and sub-adult offspring from successive litters, and other closely related individuals. Each group has a defined home range, with several core, preferred rock or log crevices shared by group members within the home range. Each group shares a common scat pile outside these refuge crevices, and are able to distinguish group members from non-group members using olfactory chemical cues. Multiple groups may share the crevices on the margins of home ranges. The individuals within these social groups bask in close contact with one another, at times touching, and the basking sites are adjacent to crevices.

The species is omnivorous, with the diet including arthropods such as beetles and grasshoppers, and plant material. The seeds of both native and introduced flora species have been found in scats, such as the native Enchylaena tomentosa (ruby saltbush), and the introduced Portulaca oleracea (common pig weed) and Medicago minima (woolly burr medic). Both seasonal and ontogenetic dietary changes have been reported in the species, with the juvenile diet consisting of a higher proportion of insects to plant matter. Adults consume a proportionally higher percentage of plants to insects, and this plant portion increases during mid to late summer. The reason for these dietary changes has not been established, although it is possible competitive pressure from juveniles following parturition, or seasonal changes in resource availability may contribute.

Potential predators include mammals such as cats, foxes and dingos. Reptiles such as the eastern brown snake and monitors, as well as birds of prey may also prey upon the species. The species uses two key mechanisms to reduce predation; the spiny tail morphology and defensive behaviours such as seldom straying far from rock crevice refuges.

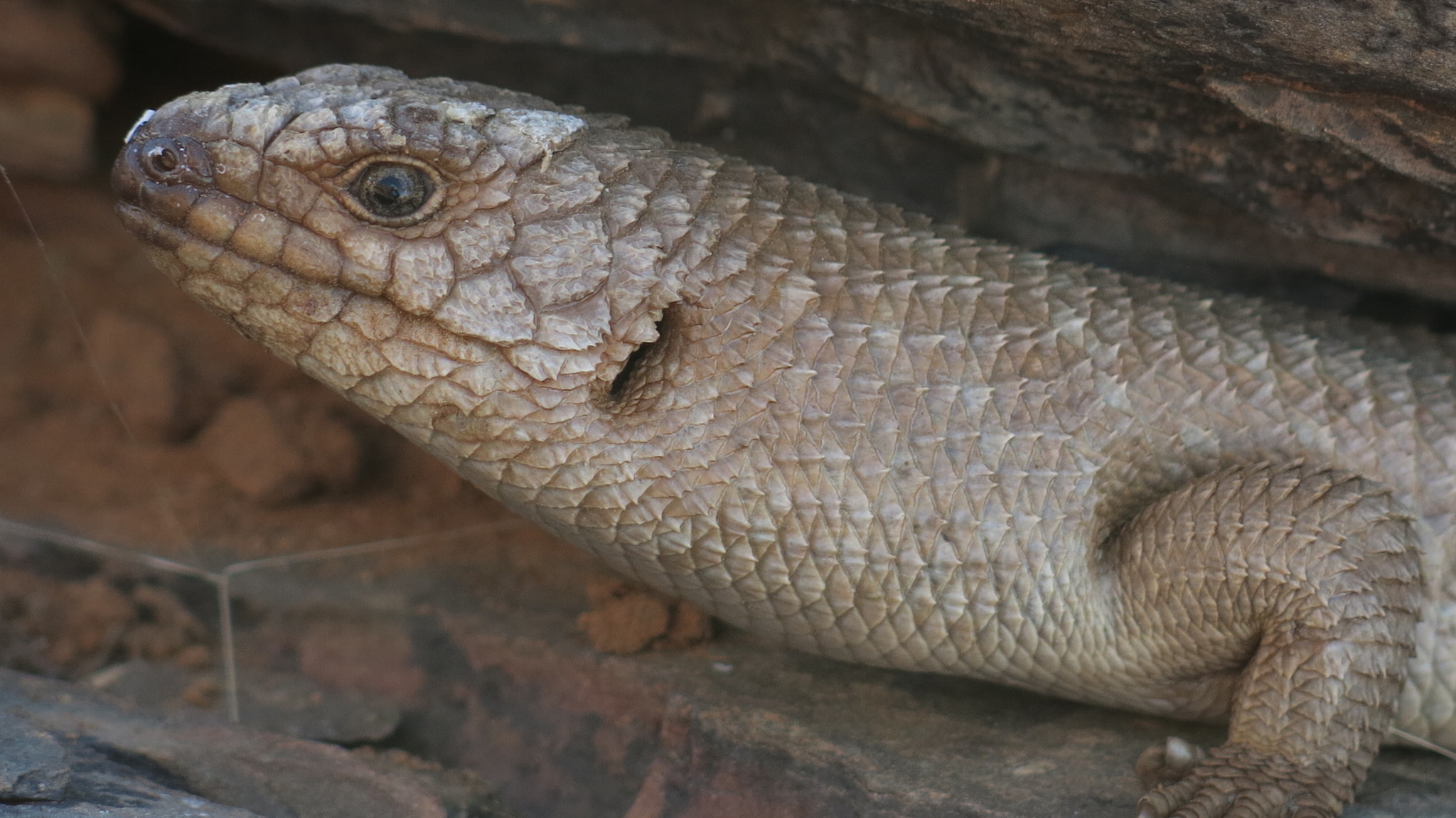
A close up of the head of Stokes's skink.

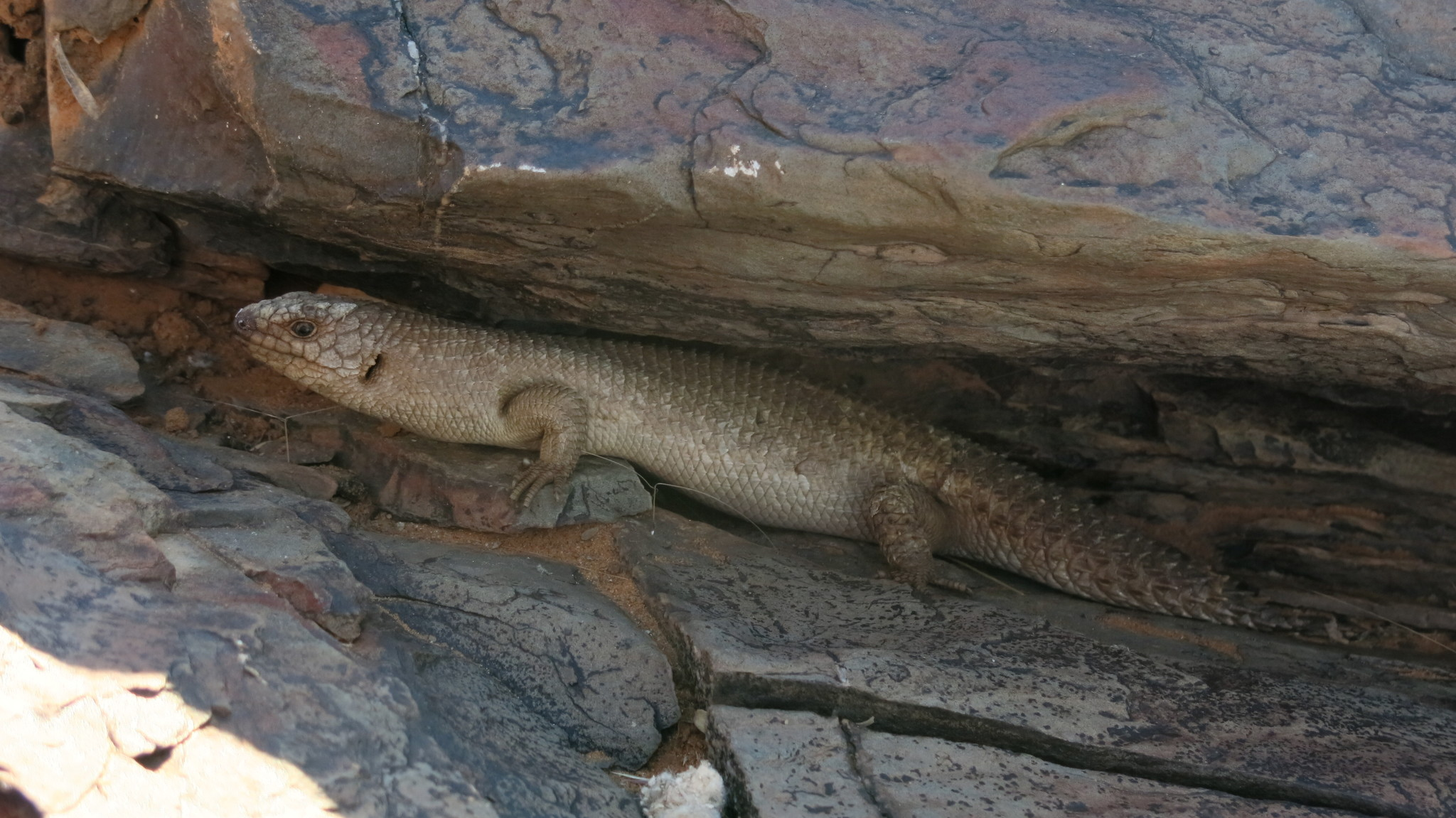
Stokes's skink sheltering in a rock crevice.

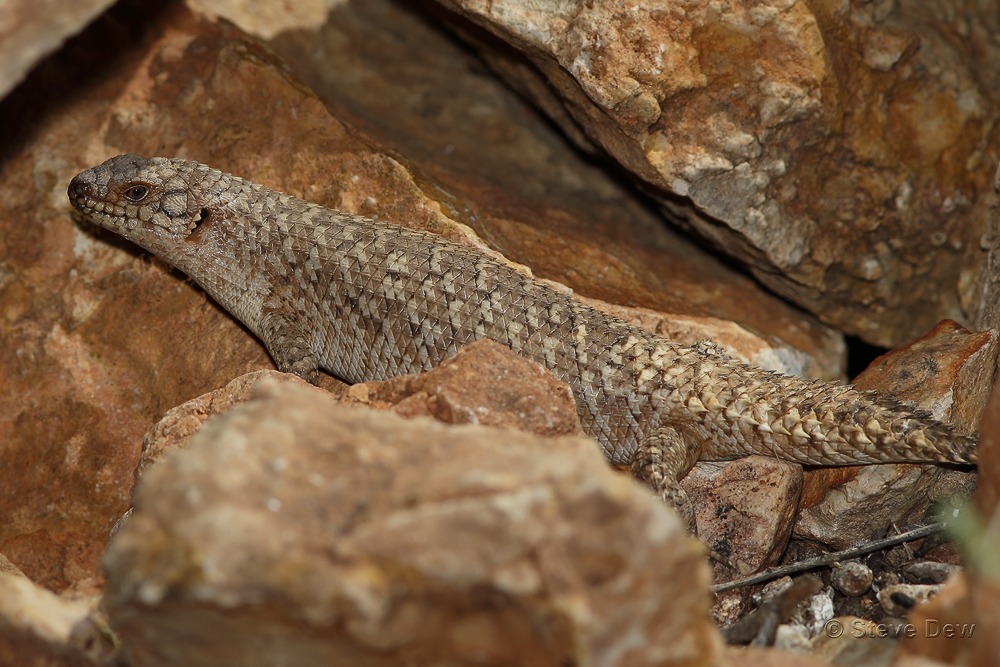
Stokes's skink.

== Habitat and distribution ==
E. stokesii may be saxicolous, occupying rocky outcrops, or semi-arboreal, and found in grassland, woodland or shrubland habitats. They are diurnal and non-burrowing, instead sheltering in rock crevices, under logs, or in tree hollows. E. stokesii is found in New South Wales, Northern Territory, Queensland, South Australia, and Western Australia.

== Reproduction ==
The species is highly monogamous, and there is evidence of mate selection favouring unrelated individuals with dissimilar genotypes and high genetic diversity, from within the established social group. E. stokesii are viviparous, producing between 1 and 8 young each litter. The parturition timeframe varies between one and twelve days, with an average time of 2.8 days. The size of the litter has been demonstrated to positively correlate with both the snout to vent length and gravid mass of the female. The young are presented head first, and encased in membranes with a yolk sac attached. The newborn skinks or mother may consume the birth membranes and yolks sac following parturition, and infanticide has been observed in the species. The reported snout to vent length of newborn juveniles is between 65-95mm, with an average birth weight of 8.15g. Populations of E. stokesii in eastern Australia typically give birth annually between during the summer months of February and March, but may not produce a litter every year. A winter birth has been observed in a wild individual from Western Australia. Juveniles experience a relatively higher infant mortality rate in their first year, whilst adults have a low mortality rate.

== Evolutionary relationships ==
Egernia stokesii, along with all Australian skinks, are grouped within the Scincidae Lygosominae subfamily. There are three monophyletic radiations of Australian skinks within this subfamily: Sphenomorphinae, Eugonylinae and Egerniinae, with E. stokesii grouped in the Egerniinae subfamily, previously known as the Egernia group. The Egerniinae includes 8 genera, including Egernia, Tiliqua and Cyclodomorphus, with 61 extant species distributed across Australia, New Guinea and the Solomon Islands. Molecular systematics has resulted in the partitioning of the previous Egernia genus into four distinct genera: Lissolepis (Peters, 1872), Liopholis (Fitzinger, 1843), Bellatorias (Wells and Wellington, 1943), and Egernia (Gray, 1838). The genus Corucia, endemic to the Solomon Islands, is considered the sister group to Australian Egerniinae.

Morphological and molecular data analysed using Bayesian phylogenetic analysis suggests the Egerniinae began to radiate in mainland Australia approximately 35 million years ago, sometime between the late Eocene and early Oligocene epochs, likely as a result of climatic fluctuations between glacial and desertification periods. Of the Egerniinae, the evidence suggests the subclade Lissolepis as basal, and the earliest-branching. Depending on the method of phylogenetic analysis, the Egernia genus has been identified as a sister group to the Tiliqua and Cyclodomorphus clade, or as a paraphyletic grouping with Tiliqua and Cyclodomorphus. It is suggested these three genera begun to diverge over 30 million years ago, during the Oligocene epoch.

== Etymology ==
The specific name, stokesii, is in honour of Royal Navy Admiral John Lort Stokes.

The subspecific name, zellingi, is in honour of British biological collector Charles Weldon De Burgh Birch, Count Zelling (1821–1894).

== Subspecies ==
There are three currently recognised subspecies of Egernia stokesii, each with distinct geographic distributions: E. stokesii badia, E. stokesii stokesii and E. stokesii zellingi . E. stokesii zellingi is found in semi-arid areas of South Australia, New South Wales, the Northern Territory and Queensland. E. stokesii stokesii occurs on the islands of Abrolhos Archipelago, off the coast of Western Australia. E. stokesii badia is found in the Wheatbelt, Murchison and Shark Bay areas of Western Australia. E. stokesii badia also includes the former subspecies E. stokesii aethipos, which occurs as an isolated population on Baudin Island, Shark Bay.

== Conservation status ==
Egernia stokesii is categorised by the International Union for the Conservation of Nature Red List as Least Concern. However, the current population has been assessed as decreasing; affected by severely fragmented populations and processes that alter or degrade habitats, such as agricultural activities, mining and altered fire regimes.

The subspecies E. stokesii badia, commonly known as the Western spiny-tailed skink, is listed as endangered under the Commonwealth Environment Protection and Biodiversity Conservation Act 1999. The key threats to the species include land clearing, grazing and cropping.
