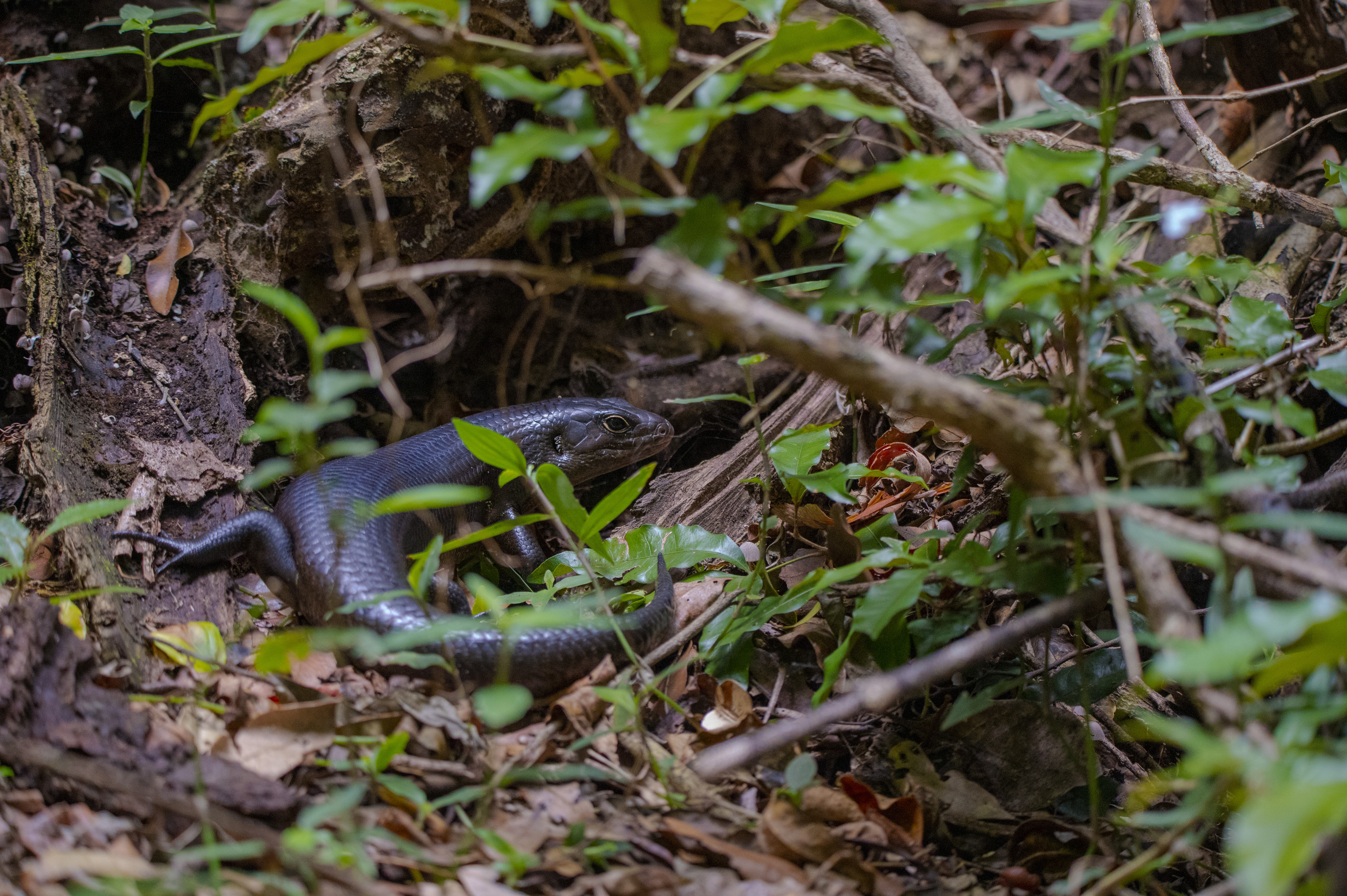

Conservation status
- Least Concern (IUCN 3.1)

Scientific classification
- Kingdom: Animalia
- Phylum: Chordata
- Class: Reptilia
- Order: Squamata
- Family: Scincidae
- Genus: Egernia
- Species: E. saxatilis

Binomial name
- Egernia saxatilis Cogger, 1960

= Black rock skink =

Species of lizard

The black rock skink (Egernia saxatilis) is a species of large skink native to Eastern and Southern Australia from central New South Wales to Grampians National Park in Victoria. A large, dark colored skink, up to 135 mm from snout to base of the tail, the black rock skink is the first reptile discovered to have a "nuclear family" structure where the parents form a pair and care for their offspring for more than one year. The black rock skink is a viviparous skink meaning females give birth to live offspring instead of laying eggs. They defend their home range and families against conspecifics for up to several years.

== Speciation ==
Egernia saxatilis is divided into two separate subspecies: E. saxatilis saxatilis and E. saxatilis intermedia. Morphological and ecological differences exist between the two subspecies. The two subspecies differ in their scale counts and degree of spinosity, along with being found in two different parts of Southeastern Australia in different types of habitats.

E. saxatilis saxatilis and E. saxatilis intermedia appear similar except for the spinose auricular lobules of E. s. saxatilis and E. s. intermedia's lack thereof. E. s. saxatilis has a slightly higher mid-body scale count with 39 in comparison to 32 on E. s. intermedia.

== Description ==
The black rock skink is a relatively large, mostly dark brown or black lizard with an average total length of 215 mm. The black upper side has a pattern of broken-up pale scales that appear as white flecks. The scales on the back are keeled and rough to the touch, while the abdominal scales are smooth and not keeled. These ventral scales are also smaller than the dorsal scales. The underside of the skink is slightly orange and the ventral sides of the tail and throat are white with scattered black markings. The sides of the lizard have black scales with a scattering of lighter brown scales throughout. The feet and digits of the black rock skink are black and shiny. The upper lip of the lizard is a lighter black color than the rest of the body. E. saxatilis reaches a maximum length of 140mm in snout to end of tail length.

E. saxatilis is diurnal and is the most active during the morning and later afternoon and spends the majority of its time sheltered in rock crevices. When the weather is warmer, they will emerge from these shelters to bask and forage.

== Habitat and distribution ==
The species is found in the southeastern woodlands of Australia, mainly on the coast and in nearby mountain ranges. They mainly inhabit the outcropping basalt bluffs of the Warrumbungle Ranges in New South Wales and the rocky outcroppings of the Great Dividing Range. E. s. saxatilis are found almost exclusively in the Warrumbungle Range, while E. s. intermedia are often found further east in the Great Dividing Range.

These skinks prefer permanent shelter for habitat including rock crevices beneath boulders and sometimes timber on rocky outcrops. Large crevices allow for a larger family to occupy them; however, they are at higher risk of attack from predators including snakes. Permanent rock crevice habitats have different levels of quality depending on their level of sun exposure and their ability to offer thermoregulatory benefits to the lizards. They spend the majority of their time in and around these shelters. Basking and foraging all occur near to this permanent home. E. saxatilis saxatilis is exclusively rock-dwelling, whereas E. s. intermedia can be found in arboreal habitats. Egernia saxatilis can be excluded from timber habitats if related Egernia species are present, and forced to remain completely saxatile.

== Ecology ==
Egernia saxatilis is active during the day, and eats small insects, but in some seasons can also eat vegetation. It lives in the crevices of rock outcrops, and stays near the crevice. It is particularly active during warm weather and often interacts socially. They can be aggressive to other skinks that enter their area.

The social organization of these Australian lizards is very complex, as a study has shown monogamous tendencies among this species, contrary to the polygamous tendency of reptiles in general. The adults and young can stay together for over a year, with the female annually producing 2 or 3 young. They are viviparous. Based on examining similar species, it is thought that they can live for 10 years, and are mature by 2 or 3 years.

== Diet ==
Egernia saxatilis prey on invertebrates and are primarily insectivores. However, plants make up a significant amount of the diet in certain seasons of the year and for larger individuals. They eat mostly beetles, ants, cockroaches, and grasshoppers.

== Behavior ==
=== Home range and territoriality ===
Black rock skinks show strong attachment to their permanent shelters because most of their activity, basking and foraging takes place in the immediate area around this site. Shelter sites range in preferability due to the amount of sun exposure they receive and thus vary in their thermal properties.

=== Interspecific and intraspecific aggression ===
Black rock skinks have a "nuclear family" structure. Entire families often inhabit a particular shelter and must defend their crevice from neighboring families. Members of the same nuclear family share these shelters, but will not share them with conspecifics or other species of lizards. While adult skinks will tolerate their own offspring, invading conspecific adults are shown aggressive territorial behavior, and conspecific juveniles will be killed or eaten. Therefore, interspecific and intraspecific aggression over territory is very common. The Black Rock Skink prefers shelters that are warmer in temperature and will exclude other families from thermally-superior shelters through agonistic behavior. These lizards attack and bite other lizards that try to enter an occupied crevice. Infanticide is common and juveniles must be protected from conspecifics for this reason. This agonistic territorial behavior is more severe interspecifically than intraspecifically. An interspecific hierarchy for the most thermally-superior shelters exists based on the physical size of the lizard family who wishes to occupy it. Biting and threatening displays are performed by the larger lizard and the smaller lizard is forced to retreat. Intruding lizards use several visible cues as indicators of the size of the inhabitant before they invade the crevice and start a confrontation. As mentioned previously, E. saxatilis has a complex familial structure in which juveniles remain under parental care in stable nuclear groups for the first several years of their life. In this species of lizard, the presence of a juvenile lizard means there is likely a parent nearby along with the rest of the family. Furthermore, the probability that a juvenile is found in the same crevice as a conspecific adult is correlated with the increasing size of the lizard species. E. saxatilis, given its moderately large size, is thus likely to be sharing its crevice with its familial group. An intruding lizard who comes into contact with a juvenile lizard of a larger species is able to recognize the threat of a larger resident adult nearby. When this occurs, the smaller lizard is more likely to retreat than continue to invade the crevice and risk injury or death in a confrontation with the larger conspecific adult. In a similar way to mammals, the familial group structure of E. saxatilis may affect the threat associated with encountering a juvenile individual when the intruding species is smaller.

=== Social behavior ===
Most black rock skinks live in "nuclear family" systems, meaning a pair of parents lives with and protects their offspring. The vast majority of juveniles live in social groups and many of them live with their biological parents in a family group. Most of the groups that had at least two adults consisted of one adult male and one adult female.

For the juveniles and adults who do not live with their genetic relatives, the majority of them live in social groups. Juvenile lizards who are not in family groups are not forced into less preferable habitats though, in terms of thermoregulatory advantages. They inhabit the peripheries of family territories or occupy smaller crevices only suitable for one lizard.

==== Kin discrimination ====
Egernia saxatilis have been found to discriminate kin from non-kin based on scent. However, black rock skinks discriminate based on familiarity rather than genotypic similarity. Juvenile E. saxatilis can recognize the difference between the scent of adults from their own family group and unrelated adults. Black rock skink recognize their family groups based on prior association and not how genetically related the other lizards are to themselves. Due to the aforementioned aggression from conspecific adults towards juveniles, it is strongly selected for juveniles to be able to differentiate between their family group and unrelated, unfamiliar adults. Kin discrimination is important for juvenile skinks to be able to stay within their own territory and avoid dangerous adults. Outside of foraging and basking, non-familial groups will emerge from their shelters to socialize with each other on warmer days.

== Reproduction and life cycle ==
Egernia saxatilis is viviparous and gives birth to 1-4 young in late February to early March. Reproduction occurs annually.

== Parental care ==
Egernia saxatilis live in small families and adults defend their territories against conspecifics. The small "nuclear families" live in the same permanent shelter and the parents protect their infants from infanticidal conspecifics in this way. Long-term monogamy and group stability can be observed in the family groups. This is evident with up to three annual sibling cohorts living together with their biological parents at a time.

Adults attack unrelated juveniles but not their own offspring. The presence of a parent significantly reduces the rate of infanticide because conspecific adults ignore juveniles when a parent is present, likely because another adult is more threatening to the aggressive lizard. Therefore, a juvenile living within its parents' own territory will experience far less attacks from conspecific adults.

Parents can provide their progeny better access to thermal resources and foraging opportunities. Increased opportunity to forage and bask leads to an increased growth rates and escape locomotion. Solitary juvenile lizards are at higher risk of infanticide because of their lack of parental protection and must take advantage of smaller crevices that adults and families would be unable to utilize. Males are more aggressive than females and win the aggressive interactions between the sexes. A female is unable to efficiently defend her young if attacked by a conspecific male and will often not confront them at all. The formation of family groups with a territorial male allows these paired males to protect juveniles from attacks by aggressive conspecific adult males.

=== Aggression between families ===
The majority of conflicts in E. saxatilis, however, occur between neighboring families and far less between wandering individuals. When several families are inhabiting overlapping territories, a dominance hierarchy will form based on aggression and size of the members of the family. The dominant family receives thermoregulatory and foraging benefits because the subordinate families shelter themselves from this family most of the time. The dominant family continues to behave normally while the subordinate family must shelter themselves to avoid confrontation. The dominant family can bask and forage more often and for a longer duration. The juveniles of these families receive these privileges from their parents' status.

== Conservation ==
The species is locally abundant, but distribution is severely fragmented and the number of adults appears to be decreasing. Egernia saxatilis was assessed by the NSW Threatened Species Committee, but there was not sufficient data to draw a clear conclusion on how threatened the species was, though due to the declining population, further investigation was suggested. The logging of eucalypts in southeastern Australia has caused a shift in the forest composition from a mixed population of young and old vegetation to an abundant amount of regrowing plants and trees. Lizards that require older and more sturdy trees to inhabit have been adversely affected. However, Egernia saxatilis is predominately a log-basking species and features of regrowth including thicker regenerating vegetation and high stem density prevent adequate sun exposure for these basking lizards. The absence of canopy openings in regrowing vegetation excludes E. saxatilis to the limited number of exposed logs clear of thick vegetation and in direct sunlight. Therefore, the deforestation in these areas forces these lizards out of their established habitats and requires them to look for a suitable habitat that becomes much more difficult to find with the regrowth process.
