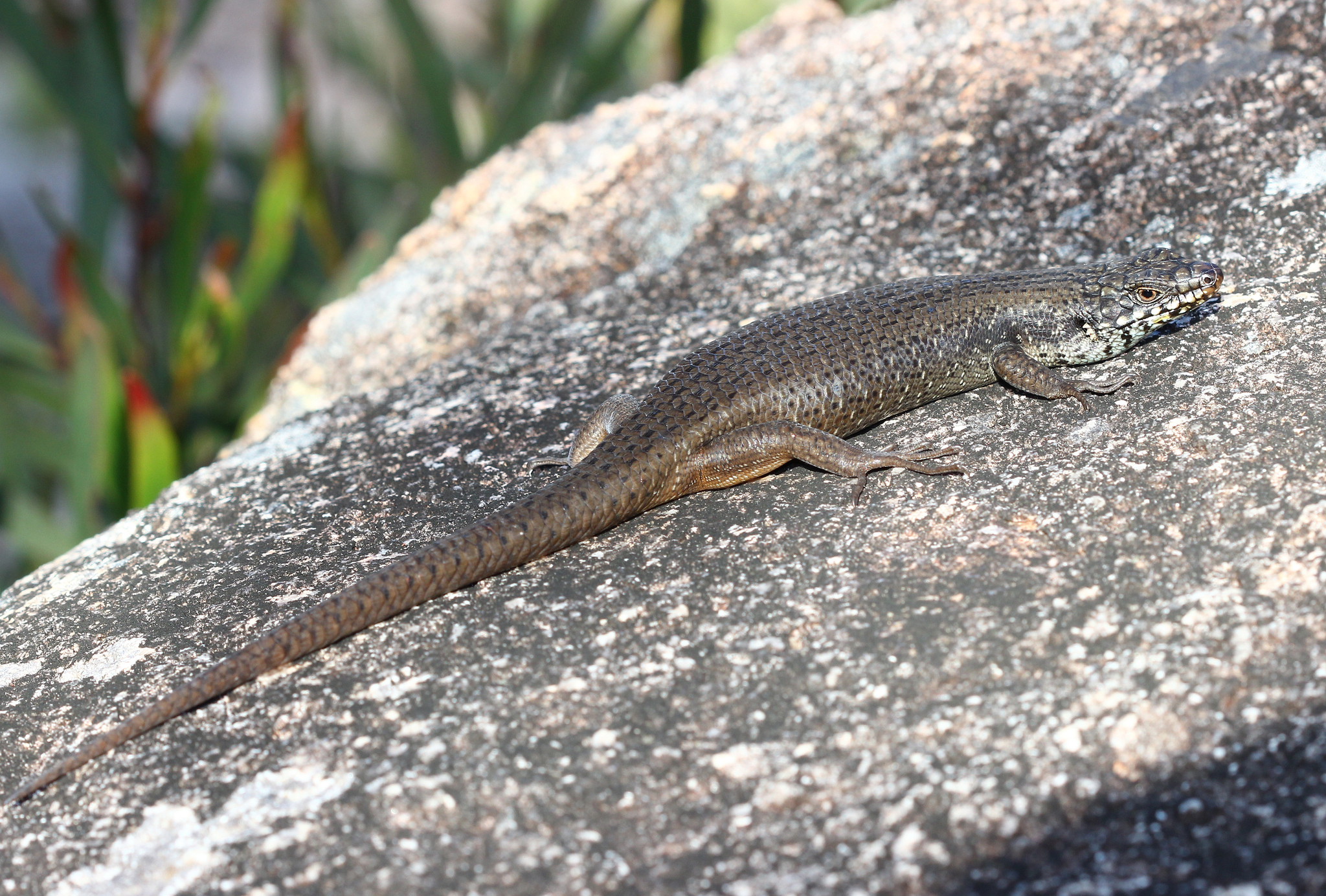

Conservation status
- Least Concern (IUCN 3.1)

Scientific classification
- Kingdom: Animalia
- Phylum: Chordata
- Class: Reptilia
- Order: Squamata
- Family: Scincidae
- Genus: Egernia
- Species: E. mcpheei

Binomial name
- Egernia mcpheei Wells & Wellington, 1984

= Eastern crevice-skink =

Eastern crevice skink

Species of lizard

The eastern crevice skink (Egernia mcpheei) is a species of large skink, a lizard in the family Scincidae. The species is native to eastern Australia.
