= Bright crevice-skink =

Conservation status
- Least Concern (IUCN 3.1)

Scientific classification
- Kingdom: Animalia
- Phylum: Chordata
- Class: Reptilia
- Order: Squamata
- Family: Scincidae
- Genus: Egernia
- Species: E. richardi

Binomial name
- Egernia richardi (Peters, 1869)

Synonyms
- Egernia carinata

Species of lizard

The bright crevice-skink (Egernia richardi) is a species of large skink, a lizard in the family Scincidae. The species is native to South Australia and Western Australia.
