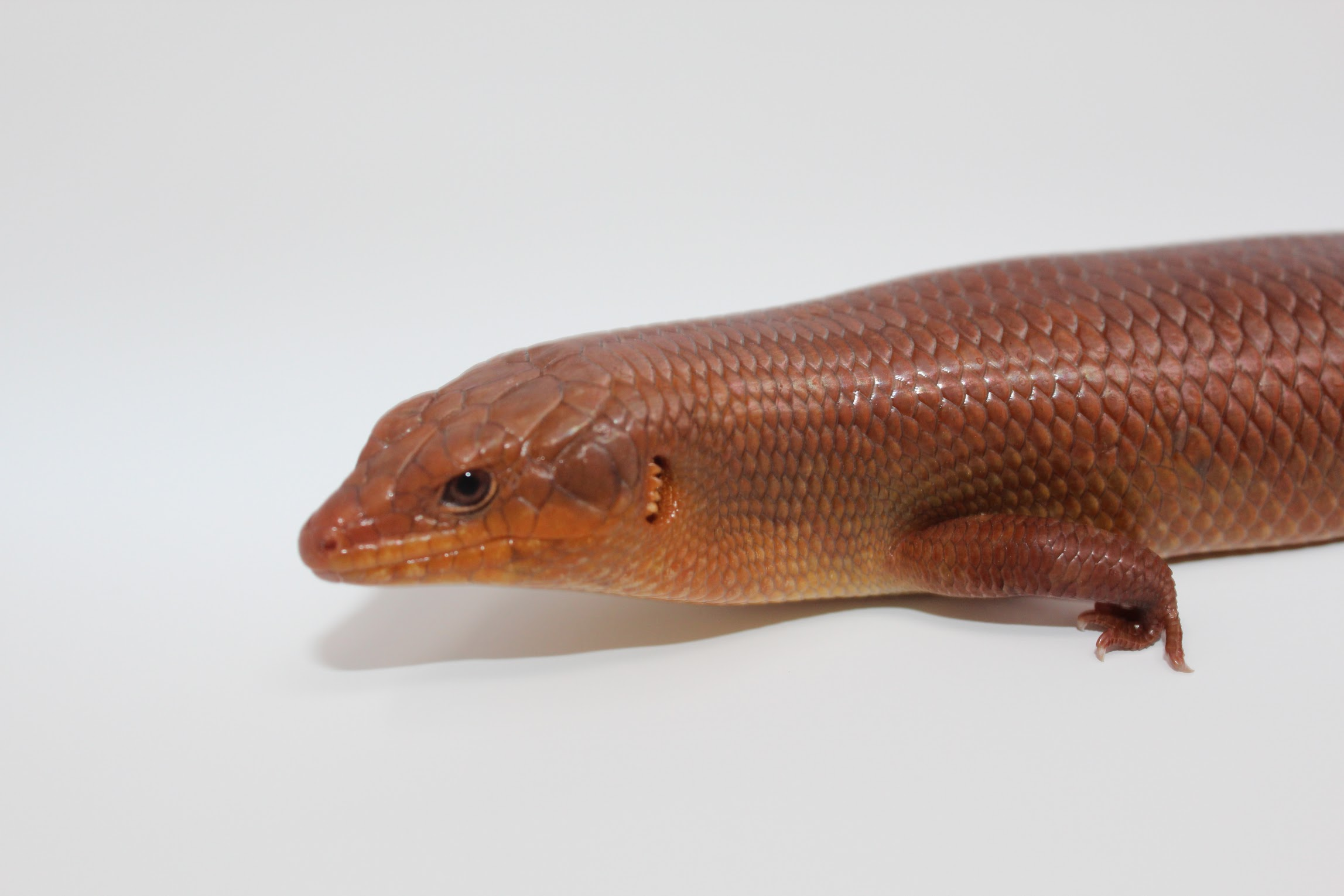

Conservation status
- Least Concern (IUCN 3.1)

Scientific classification
- Kingdom: Animalia
- Phylum: Chordata
- Class: Reptilia
- Order: Squamata
- Family: Scincidae
- Genus: Egernia
- Species: E. pilbarensis

Binomial name
- Egernia pilbarensis Storr, 1978

= Pilbara crevice-skink =

Species of lizard

The Pilbara crevice-skink (Egernia pilbarensis) is a species of large skink, a lizard in the family Scincidae. The species is native to western Australia.
