= Arnhem Land Gorges skink =

Conservation status
- Critically Endangered (IUCN 3.1)

Scientific classification
- Kingdom: Animalia
- Phylum: Chordata
- Class: Reptilia
- Order: Squamata
- Family: Scincidae
- Genus: Bellatorias
- Species: B. obiri

Binomial name
- Bellatorias obiri (Wells & Wellington, 1985)

Synonyms
- Egernia arnhemensis Sadlier, 1990; Hortonia obiri, Wells & Wellington, 1985

Species of lizard

The Arnhem Land Gorges skink (Bellatorias obiri) is a species of skink, a lizard in the family Scincidae. The species is native to Arnhem Land in the Northern Territory.

The Arnhem Land Gorges skink was first noted to be distinct in 1974 by Harold Cogger, who called it Egernia cf. frerei. Australian herpetologists Richard W. Wells and C. Ross Wellington described Hortonia obiri in 1985 from a specimen in the Northern Territory Museum in Darwin that had been collected 3 km southwest of Gunbalanya (formerly known as Oenpelli) by Brian Jukes on 28 July 1975. Ross Sadlier called it Egernia arnhemensis in 1990.
