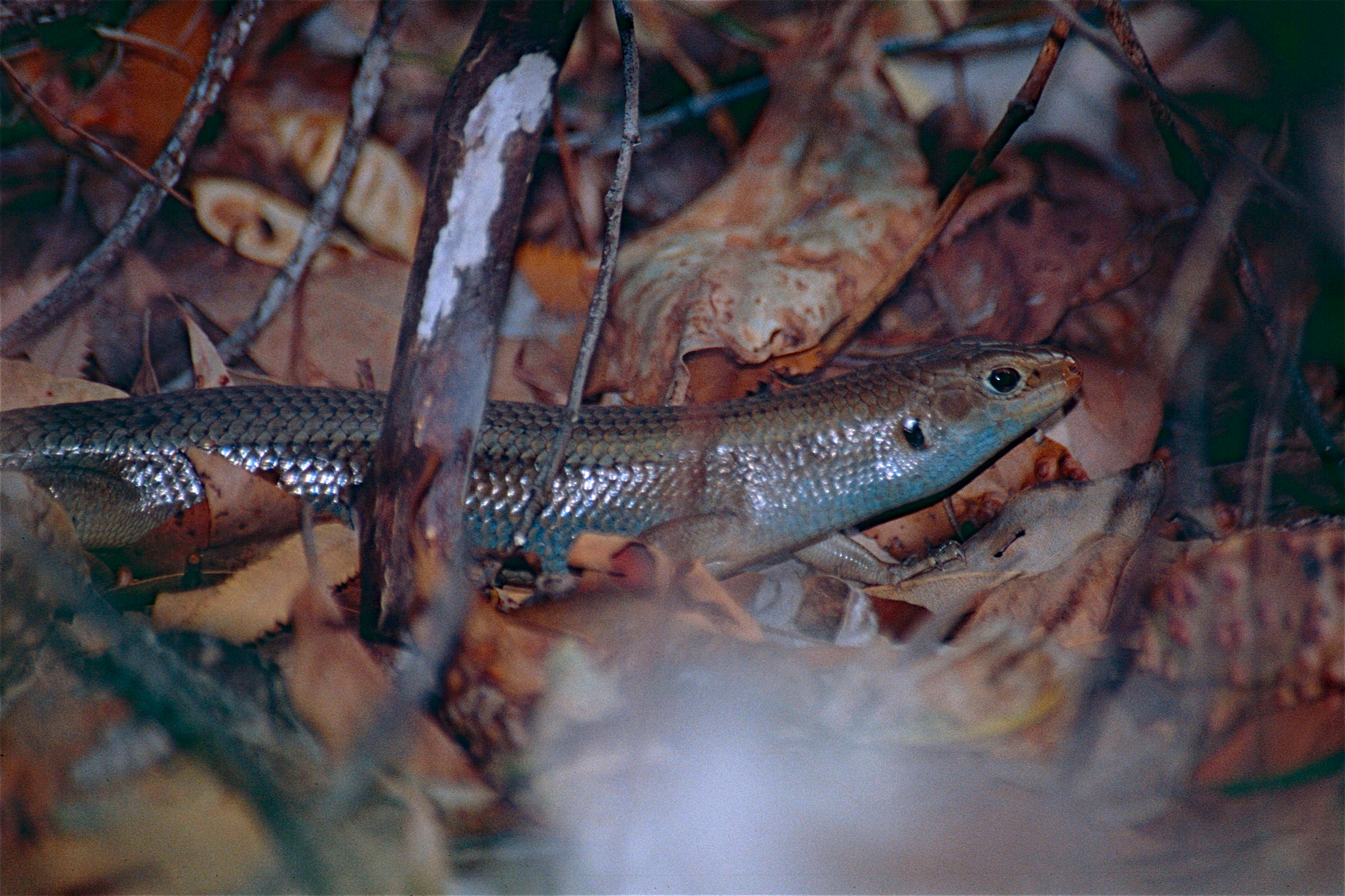

Conservation status
- Least Concern (IUCN 3.1)

Scientific classification
- Kingdom: Animalia
- Phylum: Chordata
- Class: Reptilia
- Order: Squamata
- Family: Scincidae
- Genus: Bellatorias
- Species: B. frerei

Binomial name
- Bellatorias frerei (Günther, 1897)

Synonyms
- Egernia frerei Günther, 1897; Hortonia oakesi Wells & Wellington, 1985; Hortonia shinei Wells & Wellington, 1985; Bellatorias frerei — Gardner et al., 2008

= Major skink =

Species of lizard

The major skink (Bellatorias frerei) is a species of lizard in the family Scincidae. The species is native to part of Australia and part of Australasia.

== Etymology ==
The specific name, frerei, refers to Mount Bartle Frere where the holotype was collected.

== Geographic range ==
B. frerei is found in Australia in the states of Queensland and New South Wales, and in Papua New Guinea.

== Habitat ==
B. frerei is found in a variety of habitats including forest, savanna, grassland, rocky areas, and suburban areas.

== Description ==
The holotype of B. frerei has a snout-to-vent length (SVL) of 9.3 cm (3.7 in), plus a tail length of 14 cm (5.5 in).

== Behavior ==
B. frerei is terrestrial and diurnal, basking to thermoregulate, and living socially in small colonies.

== Diet ==
B. frerei is omnivorous.

== Reproduction ==
B. frerei is ovoviviparous.
