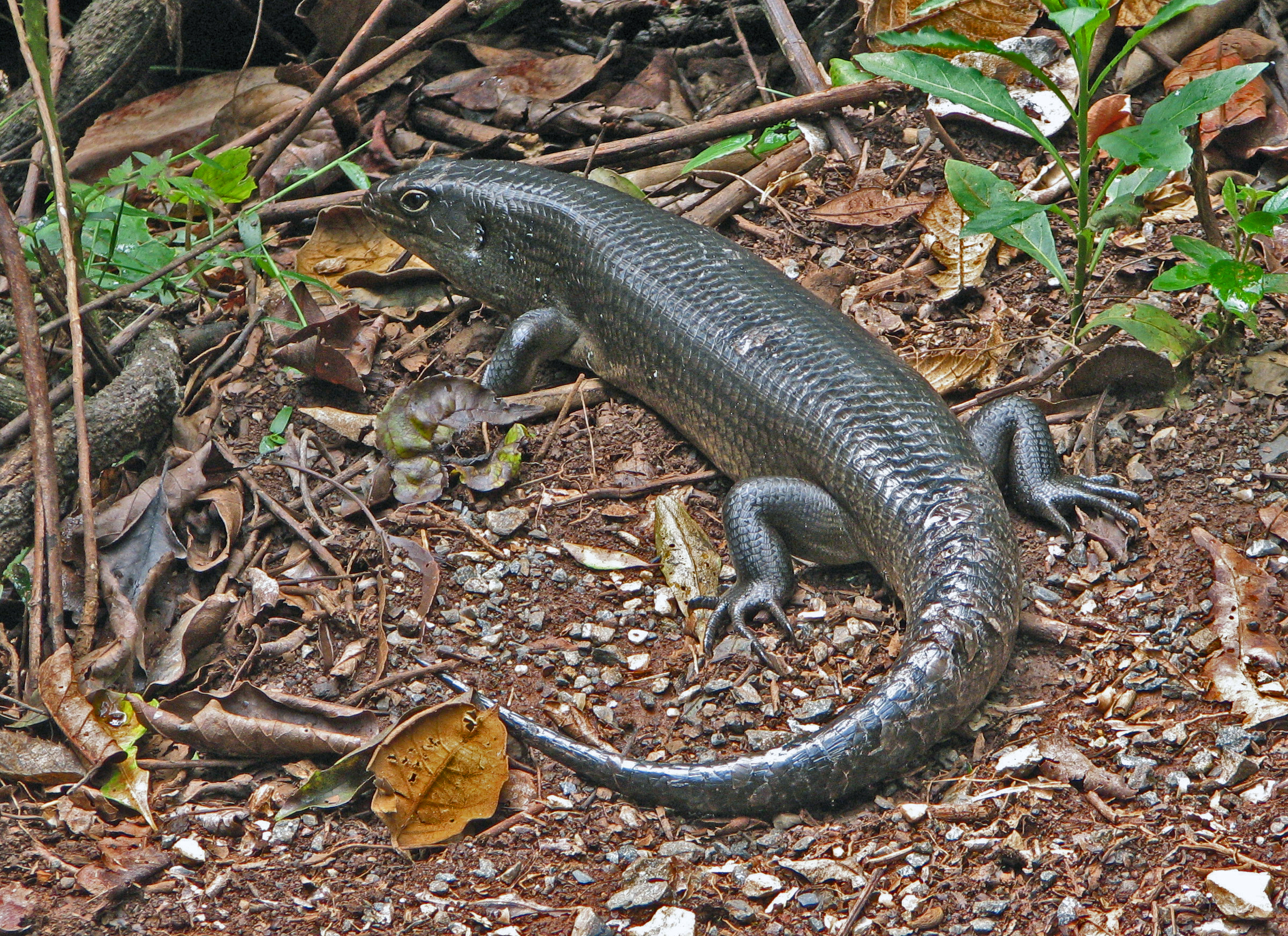

Conservation status
- Least Concern (IUCN 3.1)

Scientific classification
- Kingdom: Animalia
- Phylum: Chordata
- Class: Reptilia
- Order: Squamata
- Family: Scincidae
- Genus: Bellatorias
- Species: B. major

Binomial name
- Bellatorias major (JE Gray, 1845)

Synonyms
- Tropidolepisma major Gray, 1845; Tropidolepisma majus Gunther, 1875; Egernia bungana De Vis, 1888; Egernia major Cogger, 1983

= Land mullet =

Species of lizard

The land mullet (Bellatorias major) is one of the largest members of the skink family (Scincidae).

== Description ==
The species may reach total lengths of up to 60 cm (23.6 inches). They are uniform glossy black to brown, with a paler ring around the eye. Their colour, along with their large size, allow them to maintain a body temperature of 30 degrees Celsius; they spend much of the day basking in the sun. Adult males have slightly shorter bodies but slightly longer forelimbs and heads than adult females. The ventral side (belly) ranges in colouration from auburn (orange-brown) to white Juveniles have prominent cream lateral spots.

It is long-lived - with one captive female lizard known to have lived for at least 23 years.

The common name "land mullet" is said to date back to Longman (1918), who reported it to be in common usage for the species around Tamborine Mountain. The name probably alludes to the superficial resemblance to the homonymous fish, which has a similarly blunt head, large scales and is of similar size and coloration.

== Habitat and distribution ==
Native to Australia, they are generally restricted to the rainforest of south-eastern Queensland, Australia. The range of natural distribution is in discontinuous locations from the northern side of the Hawkesbury River in the south, to the Conondale Range, near Maleny in south eastern Queensland. They occur at altitudes from sea level (Park Beach, New South Wales) to 860 m (Springbrook P Plateau, Queensland).

The species favours habitat with many fallen logs, and it remains in close proximity to these. The restricted sunlight of the forest type require a number of basking sites to be available. It is less frequently found in other types of environments, such as the open eucalypt woodland of the region.

The lizards shelter in hollow logs or burrows. Often these are dug into the soil-bound root systems of fallen trees.

== Behaviour ==
Land mullets are normally reported to be very shy, dashing noisily to the cover of dense low vegetation if disturbed. However, in some popular National Parks, the lizards have become habituated - scavenging close to humans for scraps at picnic and camping sites.

== Reproduction ==
Land mullets are live-bearing reptiles which usually reproduce roughly 4 to 9 independent offspring per litter. Largely solitary, they primarily associate only when it is time to mate.

== Diet ==
The land mullet eats woody fungi, mushrooms, berries, seeds, insects such as beetles and grasshoppers as well as decaying fruit material.

== Gallery ==
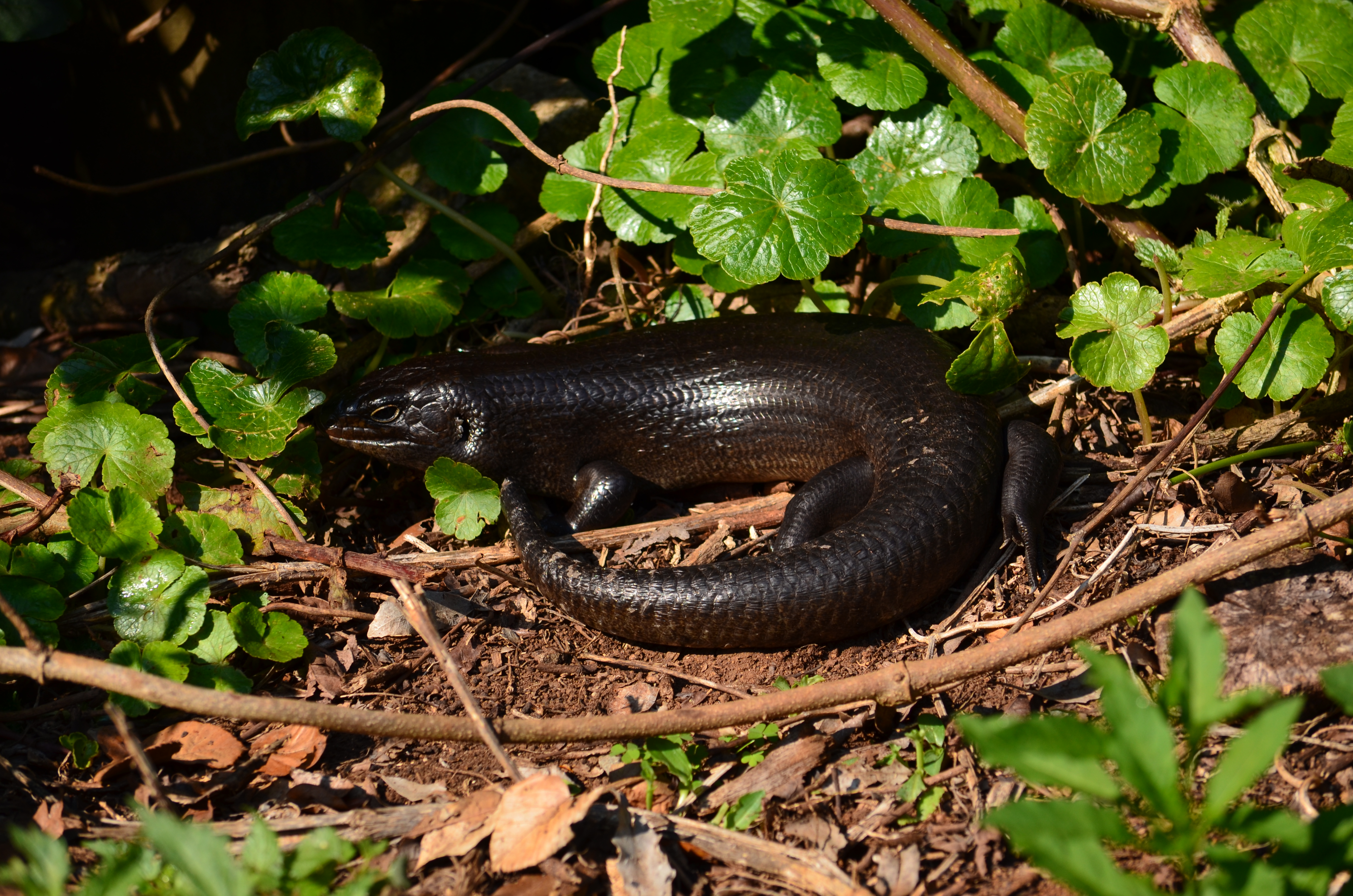
Land mullet, Lamington National Park, Queensland

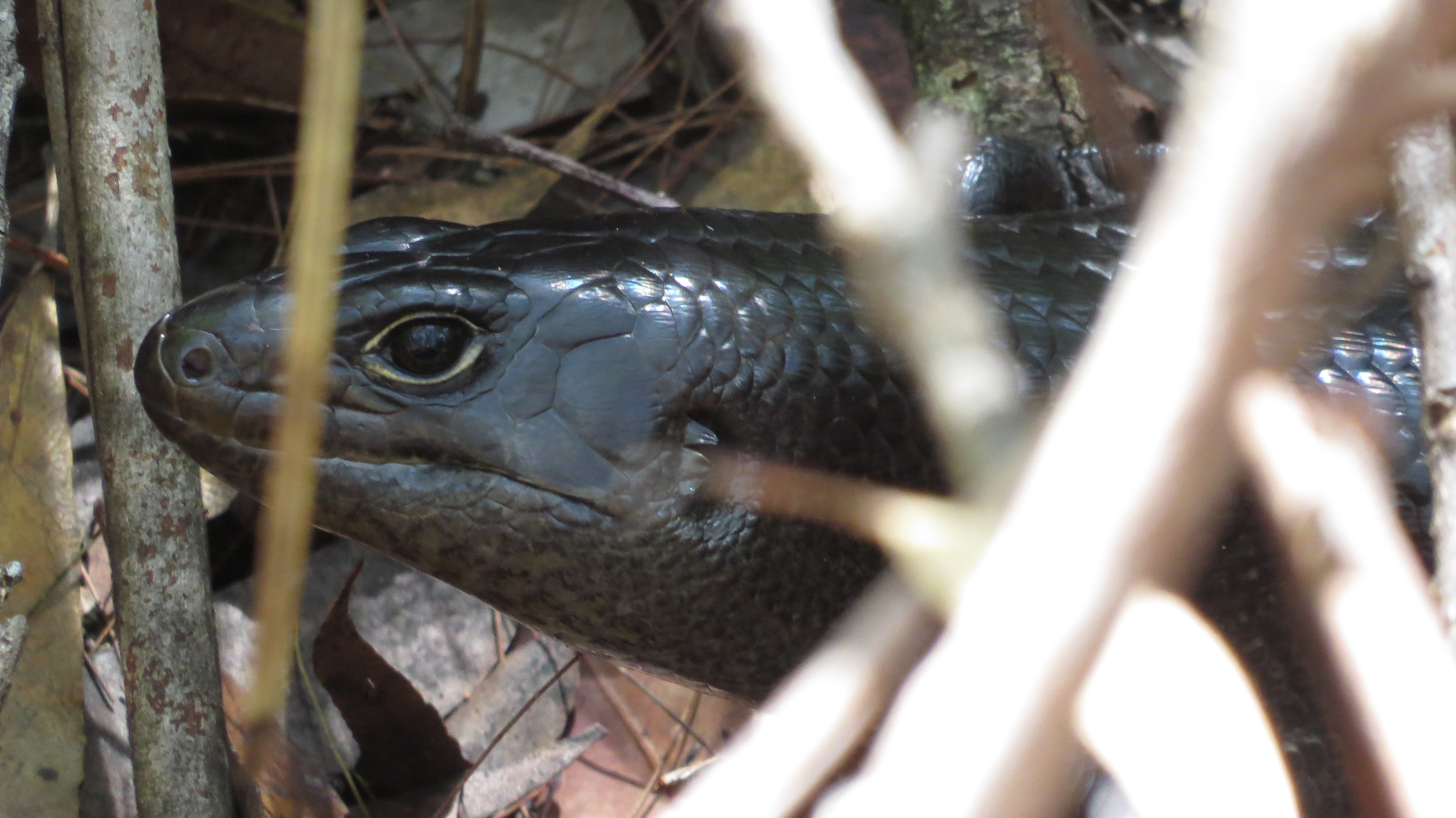
Land mullet, Mullumbimby, New South Wales, Australia
