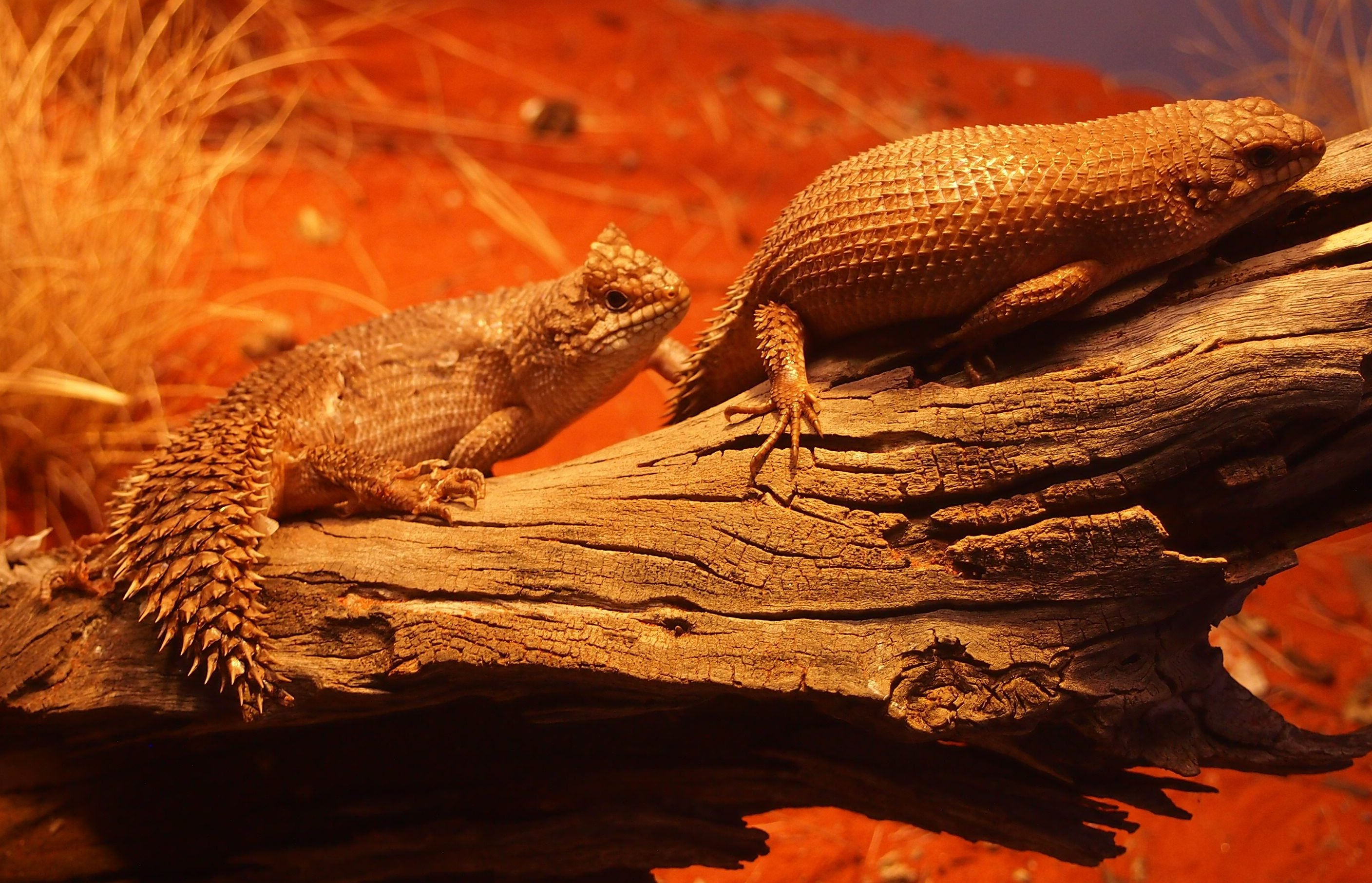
- Stokes's skink, (Egernia stokesii), a small species of Egernia sensu stricto

Scientific classification
- Kingdom: Animalia
- Phylum: Chordata
- Class: Reptilia
- Order: Squamata
- Family: Scincidae
- Subfamily: Egerniinae
- Genus: Egernia; Gray, 1832

Species
- See text

Synonyms
- Contundo Wells & Wellington, 1984; Silubosaurus Gray, 1845; Sivascincus Wells & Wellington, 1985; Storrisaurus Wells & Wellington, 1985; Tropidolopisma A.M.C. Duméril & Bibron, 1839 and see text

= Egernia =

Genus of lizards

Egernia is a genus of skinks (family Scincidae) that occurs in Australia. These skinks are ecologically diverse omnivores that inhabit a wide range of habitats. However, in the loose delimitation (which incorporates about 30 species) the genus is not monophyletic but an evolutionary grade, as has long been suspected due to its lack of characteristic apomorphies.

Some of the skinks traditionally placed in Egernia appear to be among the most intelligent squamates. They have been shown to be able to distinguish between relatives and unrelated conspecifics, and can recognize relatives individually. Several species form monogamous pair-bonds. For instance, the black rock skink is a species who can perform kin discrimination based on scent and form monogamous pair-bonds and a nuclear family structure. Most of these species belong to Egernia sensu stricto, and similar behaviour is also known in the related Solomon Islands skink (Corucia zebrata). The latter means that the high intelligence and social skills are probably plesiomorphic for the Egernia genus-group as a whole, and that the solitary species appear to have evolved towards being less intelligent and social again. It may still be, however, that the intelligent behaviour is a homoplasy that evolved several times in the Egernia genus-group; the fact that Corucia is a monotypic and rather distinct genus makes it impossible to decide at present.

== Systematics, taxonomy and evolution ==
It is the namesake genus of the Egernia genus-group, which also includes the Solomon Islands skink (Corucia), Cyclodomorphus and the blue-tongued skinks (Tiliqua). In some older works, it is considered closely related to Mabuya, but even among the subfamily Lygosominae this genus does not seem to be particularly closely related and would—were the genus-groups treated at the rarely used rank of infrafamily—certainly constitute an infrafamily of its own. On the other hand, the enigmatic crocodile skinks (Tribolonotus) might be a very basal member of the Egernia genus-group.

The genus Egernia proper, as well as the other lineages, appear to be of Miocene—probably Early Miocene—origin, meaning they radiated at least 15, maybe 20 million years ago (mya). There are fossils of Egernia-like Lygosominae from around the Oligocene-Miocene boundary 23 mya, but these cannot be assigned to the present genus with certainty. Rather, they appear to be basal members of the Egernia genus-group, still very plesiomorphic Lygosominae with a habitus similar to Mabuya.

== Species ==
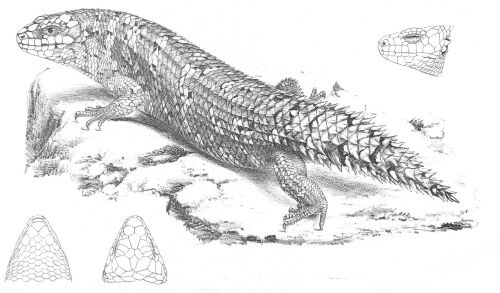
Stokes's skink (E. stokesii) is a large species of the "typical" clade

Egernia species are mid-sized to large skinks, adult snout-to-vent length (SVL) 10–24 cm (3.9–9.4 in), with a bulky, usually somewhat flattened body and small eyes. They have 24–46 rows of midbody scales, and the dorsal scales are smooth, ridged, keeled or spiny (the tail is often notably spiny). The nasal scale has a postnarial groove; the subocular scale row is incomplete. The eyelids are similar in colour to the adjacent scales.

Image	Scientific name	Common name	Distribution
	Egernia cunninghami (Gray, 1832)	Cunningham's spiny-tailed skink	southeastern Australia.
	Egernia cygnitos Doughty, Kealley & Donnellan, 2011	Western Pilbara spiny-tailed skink	northwestern Australia
	Egernia depressa (Günther, 1875)	pygmy spiny-tailed skink	Western Australia, the Northern Territory and South Australia.
	Egernia douglasi Glauert, 1956	Kimberley crevice-skink	Western Australia.
	Egernia eos Doughty, Kealley & Donnellan, 2011	central pygmy spiny-tailed skink	western Australia
	Egernia epsisolus Doughty, Kealley & Donnellan, 2011	Eastern Pilbara spiny-tailed skink	northwestern Australia
	Egernia formosa Fry, 1914	Goldfield's crevice-skink	northwestern Australia
	Egernia hosmeri Kinghorn, 1955	Hosmer's spiny-tailed skink	Queensland and the Northern Territory.
	Egernia kingii (Gray, 1838)	King's skink	southwestern Australia
	Egernia mcpheei Wells & Wellington, 1984	eastern crevice-skink, McPhee's egernia	Australia.
	Egernia napoleonis (Gray, 1838)	southwestern crevice-skink	western Australia.
	Egernia pilbarensis Storr, 1978	Pilbara crevice-skink	western Australia.
	Egernia richardi (W. Peters, 1869)	bright crevice-skink, dark spiny-tailed skink	South Australia and Western Australia.
	Egernia roomi (Wells & Wellington, 1985)		New South Wales.
	Egernia rugosa De Vis, 1888	Yakka skink	Queensland in eastern Australia
	Egernia saxatilis Cogger, 1960	Black rock skink, black crevice-skink	Eastern and Southern Australia from central New South Wales to Grampians National Park in Victoria
	Egernia stokesii (Gray, 1845)	gidgee spiny-tailed skink, gidgee skink, Stokes's skink	Australia
	Egernia striolata (W. Peters, 1870)	tree crevice-skink, "tree skink"	Victoria, the Northern Territory, Queensland, New South Wales and South Australia.

Nota bene: A binomial authority in parentheses indicates that the species was originally described in a genus other than Egernia.

=== Fossils ===
- † Egernia gillespieae K. Thorn et al., 2019

=== Splitting Egernia in four ===
Cladistic analysis of NADH dehydrogenase subunit 4, 12S rRNA, c-mos and β-fibrinogen intron 7 DNA sequence data delimits 3 clades, Bellatorias, Liopholis, and Lissolepis in Egernia sensu lato, which are best regarded as separate genera — as had already been often proposed in former times, as early as the 19th century.
