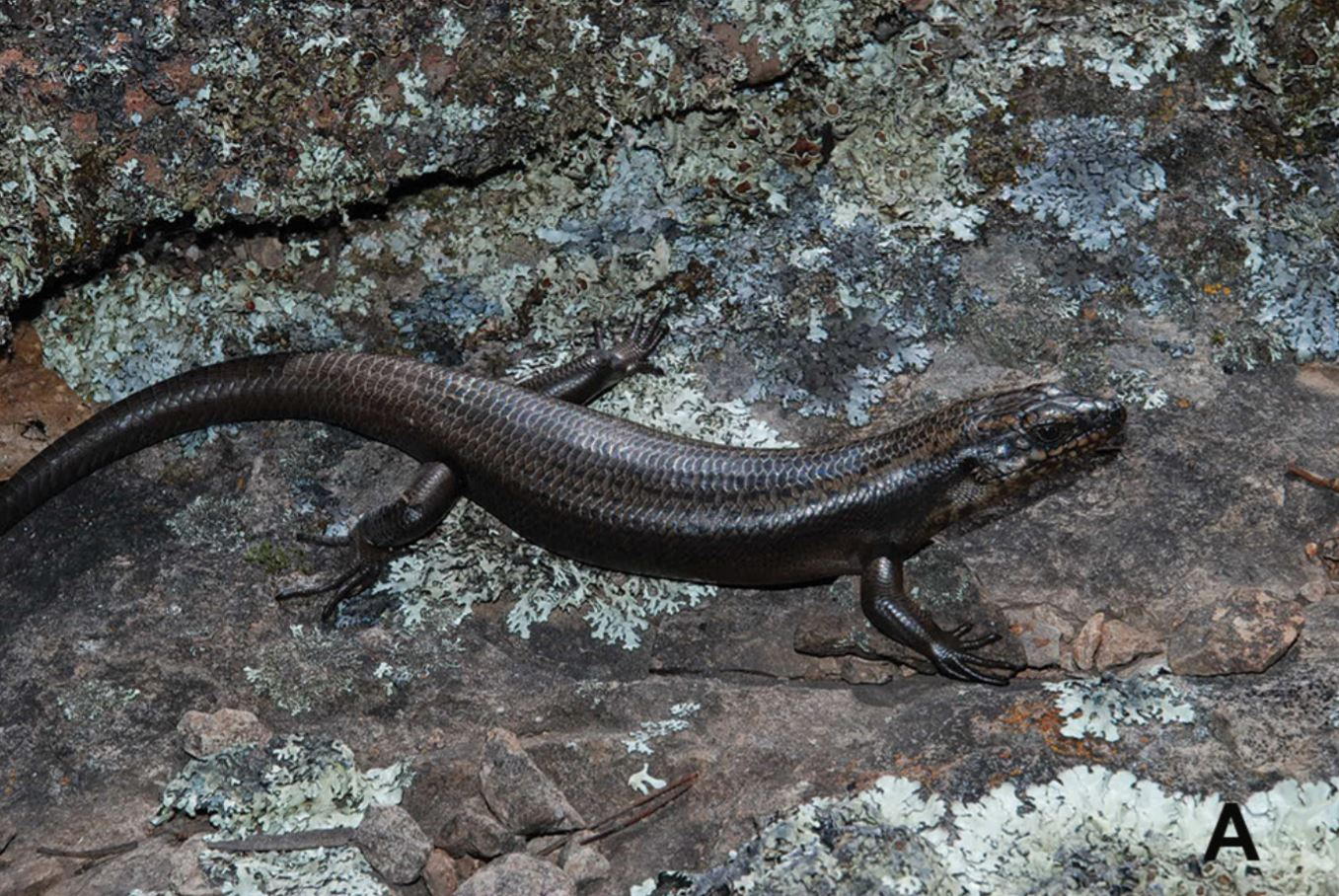

Conservation status
- Critically Endangered (IUCN 3.1)

Scientific classification
- Kingdom: Animalia
- Phylum: Chordata
- Class: Reptilia
- Order: Squamata
- Family: Scincidae
- Genus: Egernia
- Species: E. roomi

Binomial name
- Egernia roomi (Wells & Wellington, 1985)

Synonyms
- Contundo roomi Wells & Wellington, 1985

= Egernia roomi =

Species of lizard

Egernia roomi, commonly known as the Kaputar rock skink is a species of skink, a lizard in the family Scincidae.

== Description ==
The species is believed to be highly restricted in its distribution and is thought confined to the Mount Kaputar region of the Nandewar Range of inland New South Wales. (NSW) Australia. This has resulted in the common name of Kaputar Rock Skink. The formal recognition of this skink was made by Richard Wells and Ross Wellington (W&W) in their somewhat controversial publications in the mid-1980s, whereby they called on their considerable combined expertise to redress the conservation demise that they could see many species were suffering under overly conservative taxonomy at the time. Egernia roomi was one of many undescribed species warranting recognition. Unfortunately, the prevailing ideology was that only academic herpetologists could be trusted to know what they were talking about. Thus workers at the NSW Government Australian Museum (AM) aided by academics at Sydney University set about undermining the W&W publications status, demeaning their contributions and retarding the uptake of the newly assigned names for many valid new species including E. roomi. This has had significant wider conservation implications, but more specifically because any focused efforts to assist the survival of E. roomi never happened for 35 years, thanks largely to the AM. Ironically, the very same AM workers have now belatedly recognized Egernia roomi which is critically endangered under Commonwealth and New South Wales State legislation. The AM have now downplayed their role in the species' 35-year conservation demise suggesting that the species' existence had only been rumored and only now due to their efforts its conservation benefits can be exercised .
