= Central pygmy spiny-tailed skink =

Conservation status
- Least Concern (IUCN 3.1)

Scientific classification
- Kingdom: Animalia
- Phylum: Chordata
- Class: Reptilia
- Order: Squamata
- Family: Scincidae
- Genus: Egernia
- Species: E. eos

Binomial name
- Egernia eos Doughty, Kealley & Donnellan, 2011

Species of lizard

The central pygmy spiny-tailed skink (Egernia eos) is a species of large skink, a lizard in the family Scincidae. The species is native to Western Australia and the Northern Territory.
