= Egernia gillespieae =

Scientific classification
- Kingdom: Animalia
- Phylum: Chordata
- Class: Reptilia
- Order: Squamata
- Family: Scincidae
- Genus: Egernia
- Species: E. gillespieae

Binomial name
- Egernia gillespieae Thorn, Hutchinson, Archer, & Lee, 2019

Species of lizard

Egernia gillespieae was a species of skink, a lizard in the family Scincidae.

The species was endemic to Northern Australia.
