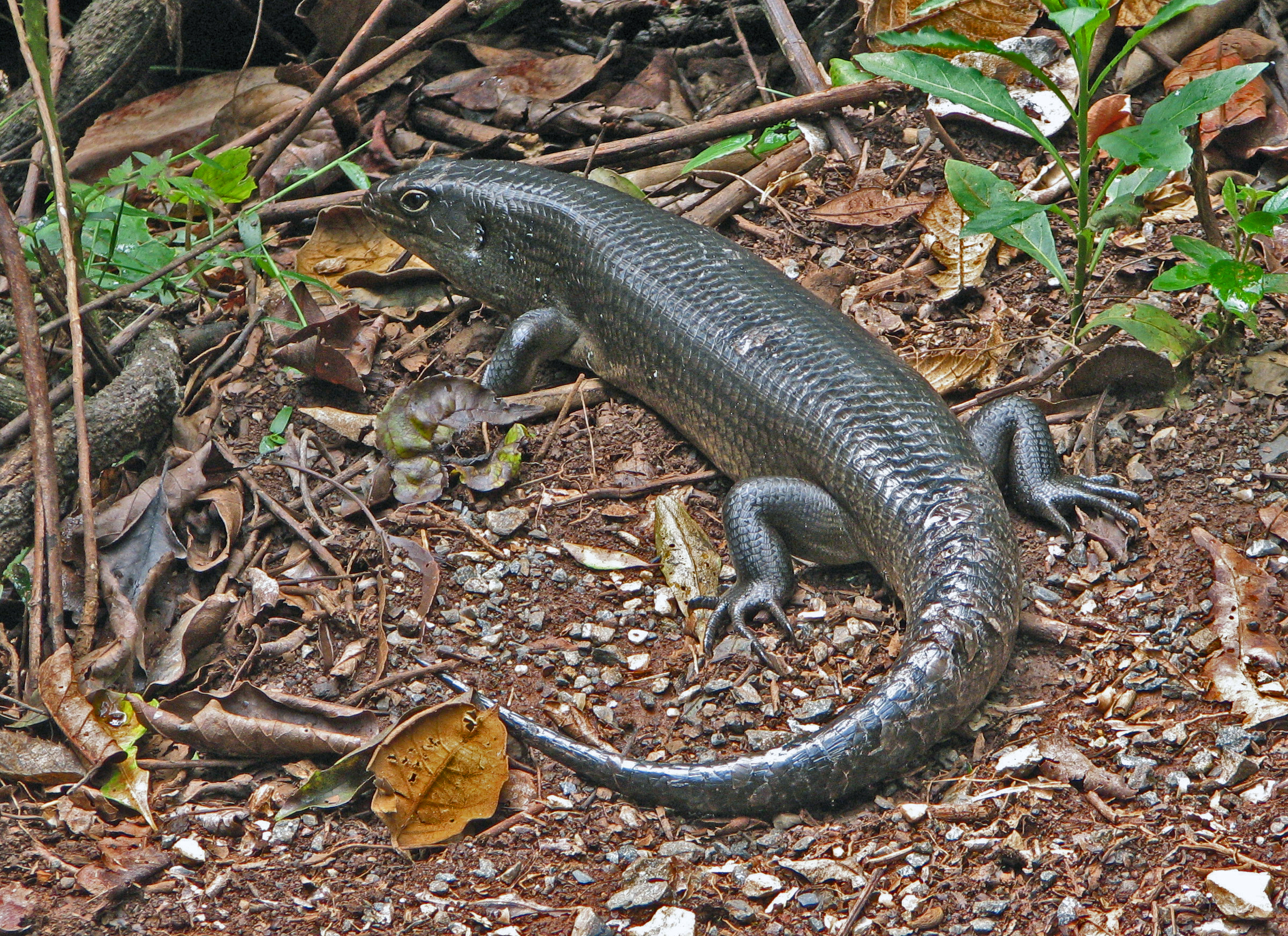

Scientific classification
- Kingdom: Animalia
- Phylum: Chordata
- Class: Reptilia
- Order: Squamata
- Family: Scincidae
- Subfamily: Egerniinae
- Genus: Bellatorias; Wells & Wellington, 1984

Species
- 3 species, see text

= Bellatorias =

Genus of lizards

Bellatorias is a genus of skinks, lizards in the family Scincidae. Species in the genus are native to Australia and Papua New Guinea. All of the species were previously placed in the genus Egernia.

== Species ==
The following three species, listed alphabetically by specific name, are recognized as being valid:

Image	Name	Distribution
	Bellatorias frerei (Günther, 1897) – Major skink	Papua New Guinea and Australia (Queensland and New South Wales)
	Bellatorias major (Gray, 1845) – land mullet	Australia (Queensland and New South Wales)
	Bellatorias obiri (Wells & Wellington, 1985) – Arnhem Land Gorges skink, Arnhem Land egernia	Australia (Northern Territory)

Nota bene: A binomial authority in parentheses indicates that the species was originally described in a genus other than Bellatorias.
