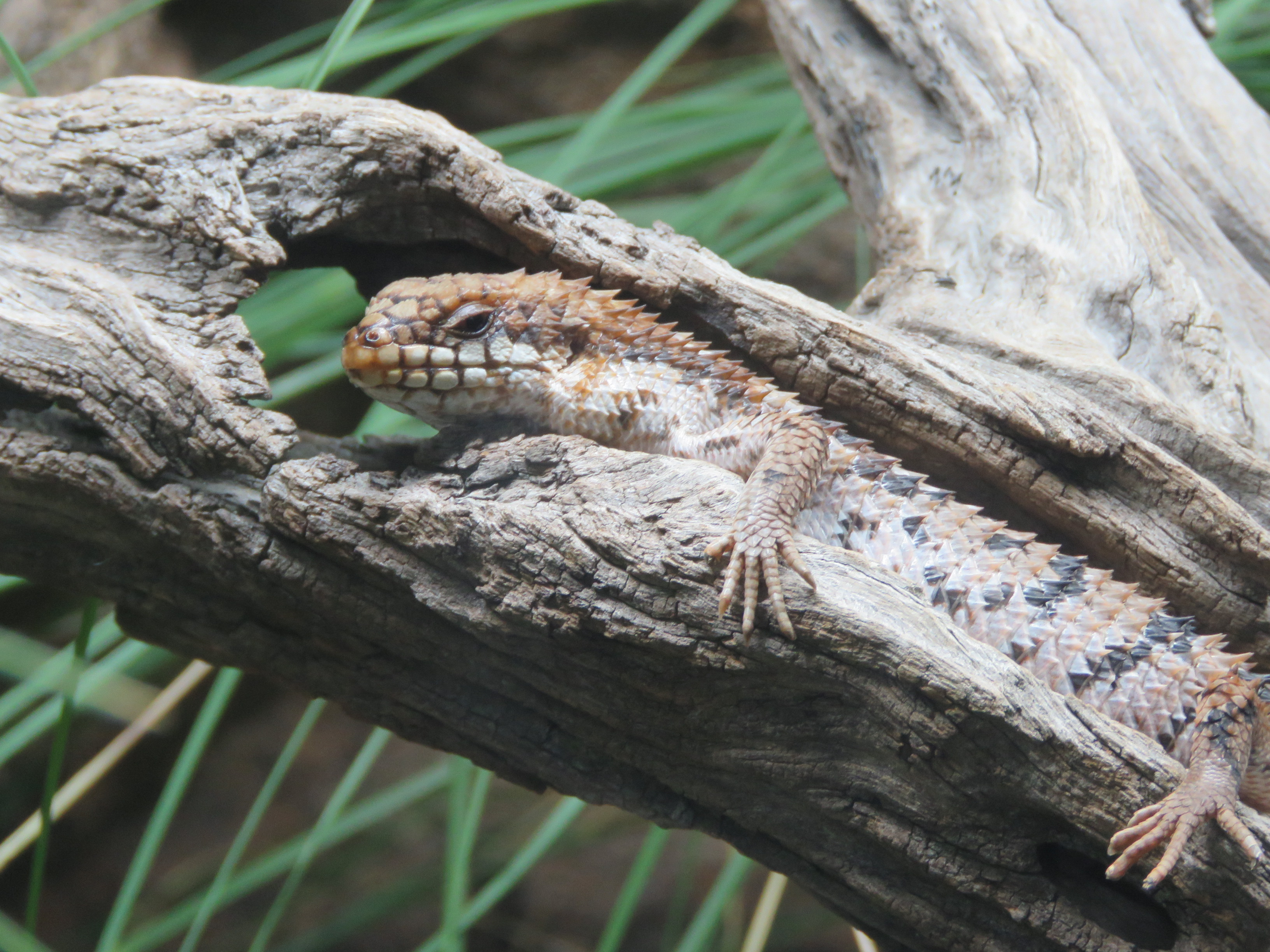

Conservation status
- Least Concern (IUCN 3.1)

Scientific classification
- Kingdom: Animalia
- Phylum: Chordata
- Class: Reptilia
- Order: Squamata
- Family: Scincidae
- Genus: Egernia
- Species: E. depressa

Binomial name
- Egernia depressa (Günther, 1875)

Synonyms
- Silubosaurus depressus Günther, 1875

= Pygmy spiny-tailed skink =

Species of lizard

The pygmy spiny-tailed skink, Egernia depressa, sometimes also known as the small spiny-tailed skink, is a species of skink found in south Western Australia.

The species is endemic to Australia and is found in Western Australia.

A somewhat social species, pygmy spiny-tailed skinks live in small family groups in the desert. Omnivores, they feed on insects, some flowers, fruits, shoots, and leaves.

Pygmy spiny-tailed skinks grow up to 16 centimetres long, however, they are able to inflate their bodies larger to jam themselves into crevices as a predator evasion tactic. Their spine-covered tails help block the way. They are known to live in crevices, hollows of trees, and termite mounds.

The skinks have very spiny back scales and smooth bellies; however, often their dorsal scales become ground down with rocks. Each dorsal scale has three spines, or keels, unlike some other Egernia species. The central spine is the largest, usually twice as long as the two other spines which flank it.
