= Caversham Wildlife Park =

Wildlife park in Western Australia

- Interactive map of Caversham Wildlife Park
- 31.83364°S 115.951031°E
- Date opened: 1988: Caversham; 2003: Whiteman Park
- Location: Whiteman, Western Australia
- No. of animals: 2000+
- No. of species: 180+
- Memberships: ZAA
- Website: cavershamwildlife.com.au

Caversham Wildlife Park is a wildlife park currently located in Whiteman Park in Western Australia. It is home to several Australian animals including kangaroos, koalas, possums, wallabies, wombats and Tasmanian devils.

It was originally located in the locality of Caversham. The Park was bought by a couple, David and Pat, in 1988 and covered 2 hectares (4.9 acres) of land. It was later doubled in size when the couple bought the adjoining property and increased the number of animals.

It shifted into Whiteman Park in 2003.

The park is home to over 100 species of birds, at least 19 species of native marsupial mammals, and at 36 species of native reptiles, as well as many others.

== Animals and exhibits ==
=== Amphibians ===
- Australian green tree frog
- Cave-dwelling frog
- Splendid tree frog

=== Arachnids ===
- Australian tarantula
- Flinders Range scorpion
- Redback spider

=== Birds ===
- Ancona chicken
- Australian bustard
- Australian boobook owl
- Australian pelican
- Australian saddbleback tumbler
- Australian shelduck
- Bar-shouldered dove
- Barking owl
- Barn owl
- Baudin’s black cockatoo
- Black breasted buzzard
- Black swan
- Black-faced cuckooshrike
- Black-headed ibis
- Black-necked stork
- Black-winged stilt
- Blue-and-yellow macaw
- Blue-billed duck
- Blue-faced honeyeater
- Blue-winged kookaburra
- Blue-winged parrot
- Brown cuckoo dove
- Brown quail
- Budgerigar
- Buff-banded rail
- Bush thick-knee
- Cape Barren goose
- Carnaby's black cockatoo
- Cattle egret
- Chestnut teal
- Chinese goose
- Cockatiel
- Common bronzewing
- Crested pigeon
- Crested tern
- Domestic turkey
- Eastern rosella
- Eclectus parrot
- Emerald ground dove
- Emu
- Fantail pigeon
- Flock bronzewing
- Galah
- Gang-gang cockatoo
- Glossy ibis
- Golden pheasant
- Grass owl
- Eastern great egret
- Green catbird
- Grey teal
- Hardhead
- Helmeted guineafowl
- Indian peafowl
- Jacobin pigeon
- Japanese bantam
- Jenday conure
- Laughing kookaburra
- Lesser sooty owl
- Little corella
- Little penguin
- Long-billed corella
- Long-tailed finch
- Magpie goose
- Major Mitchell's cockatoo
- Maned duck
- Masked lapwing
- Masked owl
- Mulga parrot
- Musk lorikeet
- Norwich cropper pigeon
- Ostrich
- Pacific black duck
- Peaceful dove
- Pied honeyeater
- Plumed whistling duck
- Princess parrot
- Purple-crowned lorikeet
- Radjah shelduck
- Rainbow lorikeet
- Red wattlebird
- Red-capped parrot
- Red-collared lorikeet
- Red-tailed black cockatoo
- Regent parrot
- Ringneck parrot
- Rose-crowned fruit-dove
- Rufous night heron
- Sacred kingfisher
- Scaly-breasted lorikeet
- Scarlet-chested parrot
- Silkie
- Silver gull
- Southern cassowary
- Spinifex pigeon
- Star finch
- Sulphur-crested cockatoo
- Superb parrot
- Swinhoe's pheasant
- Tawny frogmouths
- Torres Strait imperial pigeon
- Wandering whistling duck
- Wedge-tailed eagle
- Western corella
- Western rosella
- White-browed woodswallow
- White-faced heron
- White-headed pigeon
- White-tailed black cockatoo
- Wonga pigeon
- Wyandotte
- Yellow-crowned amazon
- Yellow-tailed black cockatoo
- Yellow-throated miner

=== Fish ===
- Koi

=== Insects ===
- Giant centipede
- Spiny leaf insect

=== Mammals ===
- Agile wallaby
- Alpaca
- Angus cow
- Asian water buffalo
- Belted Galloway cow
- Brahman cattle
- Brush-tailed bettong
- Clydesdale horse
- Common brushtail possum
- Dingo
- Domestic donkey
- Domestic goat
- Domestic rabbit
- Domestic sheep
- Dromedary camel
- European red fox
- Ghost bat
- Greater bilby
- Grey-headed flying fox
- Guinea pig
- Highland cattle
- Koala
- Long-nosed potoroo
- Quokka
- Red kangaroo (including albino)
- Red-necked pademelon
- Rufous bettong
- Shetland pony
- Short-beaked echidna
- Southern brown bandicoot
- Southern hairy-nosed wombat
- Spectacled flying fox
- Spotted-tailed quoll
- Squirrel glider
- Swamp wallaby
- Tammar wallaby
- Western grey kangaroo
- Western ringtail possum
- Yellow-footed rock wallaby

=== Reptiles ===
- Banded knob-tailed gecko
- Black-headed monitor
- Black-headed python
- Blotched blue-tongued lizard
- Boyd's forest dragon
- Brown tree snake
- Centralian knob-tailed gecko
- Coastal carpet python (including albino)
- Cunningham's skink
- Dugite
- Eastern pygmy spiny-tailed skink
- Eastern water dragon
- Fraser's delma
- Freshwater crocodile
- Frill-neck lizard
- King brown snake
- Lace monitor
- Long-nosed dragon
- Macquarie turtle
- Marbled velvet gecko
- Marble-faced delma
- Mertens' water monitor
- Mulga dragon
- Night skink
- Northern blue-tongued lizard
- Northern red-faced turtle
- Northern spiny-tailed gecko
- Oblong turtle
- Olive python
- Perentie
- Pink-tongued lizard
- Shingleback lizard
- Southwestern carpet python
- Southern death adder
- Southern pygmy spiny-tailed skink
- Stimson’s python
- Tiger snake
- Water python
- Woma python
