= Nephrurus sheai =

Conservation status
- Least Concern (IUCN 3.1)

Scientific classification
- Kingdom: Animalia
- Phylum: Chordata
- Class: Reptilia
- Order: Squamata
- Suborder: Gekkota
- Family: Carphodactylidae
- Genus: Nephrurus
- Species: N. sheai

Binomial name
- Nephrurus sheai Couper, 1994

Species of lizard

Nephrurus sheai, also known commonly as the Kimberley rough knob-tailed gecko and the northern knob-tailed gecko, is a species of lizard in the family Carphodactylidae. The species is endemic to Australia.

== Etymology ==
The specific name, sheai, is in honor of Australian herpetologist Glenn Michael Shea (born 1961).

== Geographic range ==
N. sheai is found in Northern Territory and Western Australia.

== Habitat ==
The preferred natural habitats of N. sheai are dry caves, rocky areas, and forest.

== Diet ==
N. sheai is known to prey upon Lepidopteran larvae (caterpillars), Isoptera (termites), and Gastropoda (land snails).

== Reproduction ==
N. sheai is oviparous.
