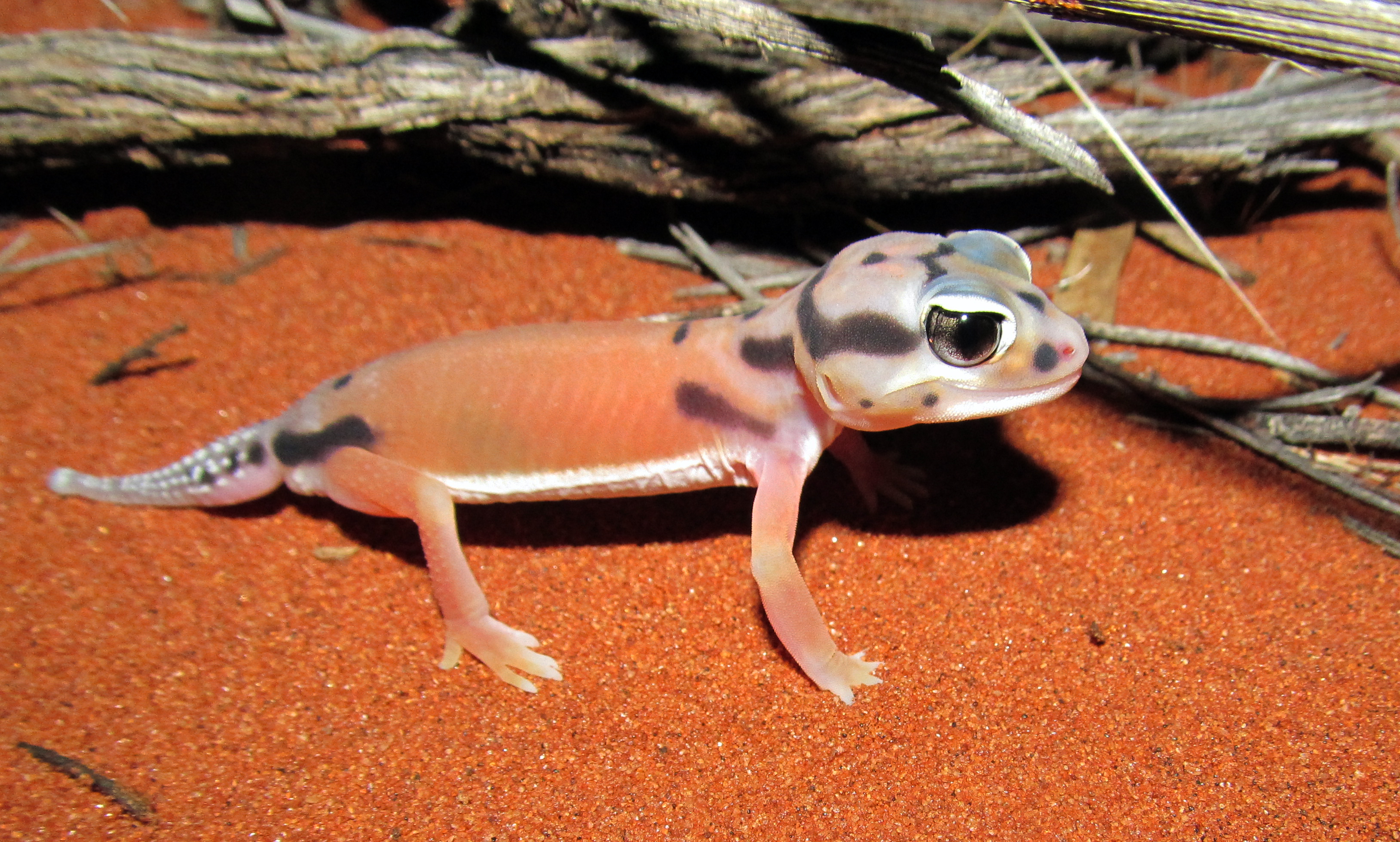
- Nephrurus laevissimus

Scientific classification
- Domain: Eukaryota
- Kingdom: Animalia
- Phylum: Chordata
- Class: Reptilia
- Order: Squamata
- Infraorder: Gekkota
- Family: Carphodactylidae
- Genus: Nephrurus; Günther, 1876

Species
- 11 described species, see article.

= Knob-tailed gecko =

Genus of lizards

The genus Nephrurus, collectively referred to as the knob-tailed geckos (or “knob-tails”), comprises several species of small, desert-dwelling, drought-tolerant Australian gecko. They are named for their stubby, knob-like tails, and are also easily identified by their rather large eyes. This adaptation of enlarged eyes is indicative of an animal’s lifestyle being predominantly crepuscular or nocturnal.

== Description ==
Lizards of this genus are easily distinguished by their short bodies, large heads, small legs, and short, carrot-shaped tails that often end in a small knob.

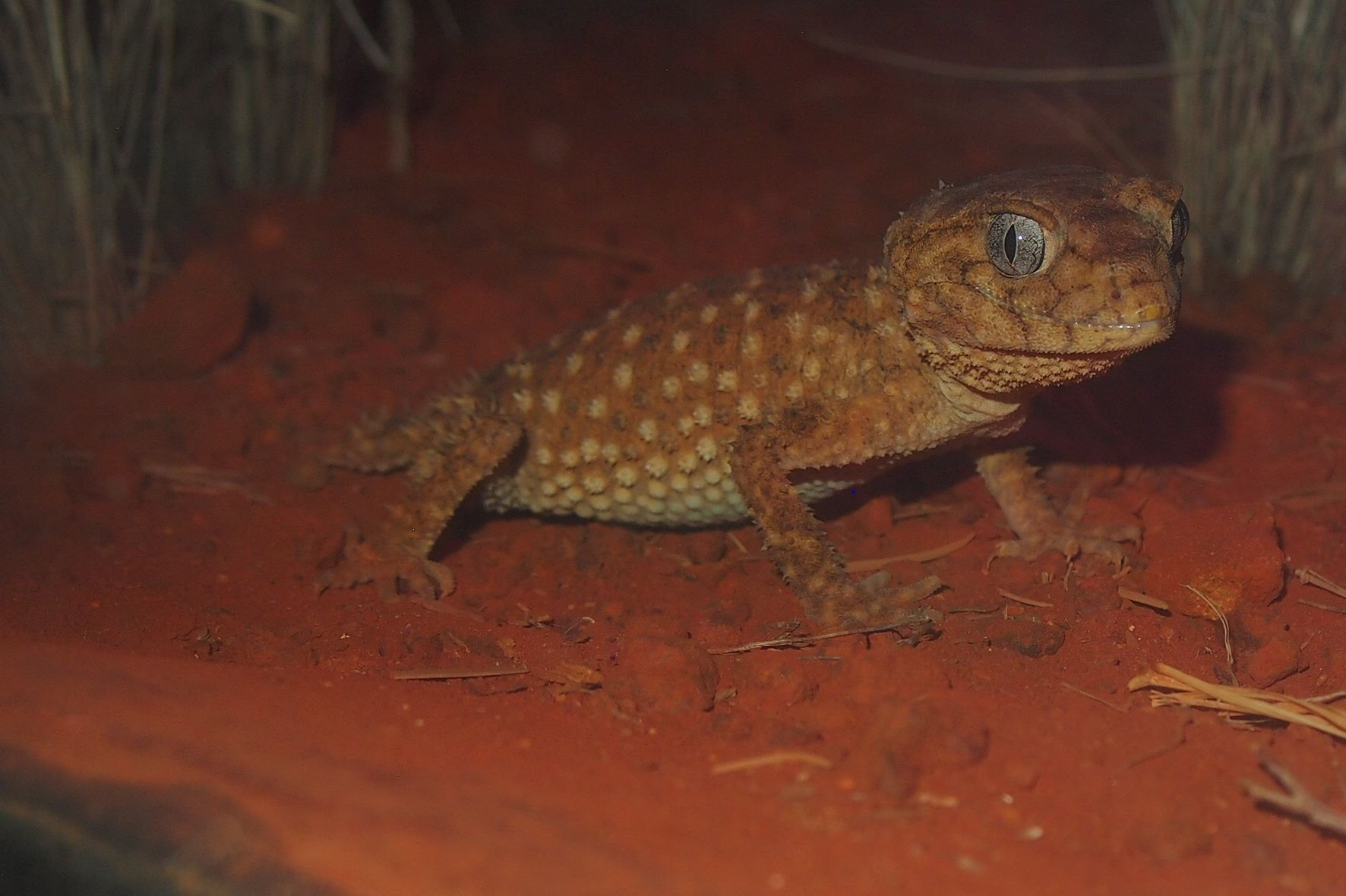
Nephrurus amyae

== Species ==
The following 11 species are recognized as being valid.

- Nephrurus amyae Couper in Couper & Gregson, 1994 – Centralian rough knob-tailed gecko
- Nephrurus asper Günther, 1876 – rough knob-tailed gecko
- Nephrurus cinctus Storr, 1963 – northern banded knob-tailed gecko
- Nephrurus deleani Harvey, 1983 – Pernatty knob-tailed gecko
- Nephrurus eromanga Oliver, Donnellan & Gunn, 2022
- Nephrurus laevissimus Mertens, 1958 – smooth knob-tailed gecko
- Nephrurus levis De Vis, 1886 – smooth knob-tailed gecko
  - Nephrurus levis levis De Vis, 1886
  - Nephrurus levis occidentalis Storr, 1963
  - Nephrurus levis pilbarensis Storr, 1963
- Nephrurus sheai Couper in Couper & Gregson, 1994 – Kimberley rough knob-tailed gecko
- Nephrurus stellatus Storr, 1968 – stellate knob-tailed gecko
- Nephrurus vertebralis Storr, 1963 – midline knob-tailed gecko
- Nephrurus wheeleri Loveridge, 1932 – banded knob-tailed gecko

The former Nephrurus milii Bory de Saint-Vincent, 1823, is now Underwoodisaurus milii (Bory de Saint-Vincent, 1823) – barking gecko.

== As pets ==
Some species are sold and captive bred as pets such as Nephrurus amyae, Nephrurus asper, Nephrurus cinctus, Nephrurus deleani, Nephrurus laevissimus, Nephrurus levis, Nephrurus vertebralis and Nephrurus wheeleri.
