= Nephrurus stellatus =

Conservation status
- Least Concern (IUCN 3.1)

Scientific classification
- Kingdom: Animalia
- Phylum: Chordata
- Class: Reptilia
- Order: Squamata
- Suborder: Gekkota
- Family: Carphodactylidae
- Genus: Nephrurus
- Species: N. stellatus

Binomial name
- Nephrurus stellatus Storr, 1968

Species of lizard

Nephrurus stellatus, also known as the stellate knob-tailed gecko, starry knob-tailed gecko, or southern knob-tailed gecko, is a species of gecko in the family Carphodactylidae. It is endemic to southern Australia.

== Geographic range ==
N. stellatus is found in the arid regions of the Eyre Peninsula and southern Western Australia.

The holotype was collected near Southern Cross, Western Australia.

== Taxonomy ==
The original description of this species was by Glen Milton Storr in 1968.
