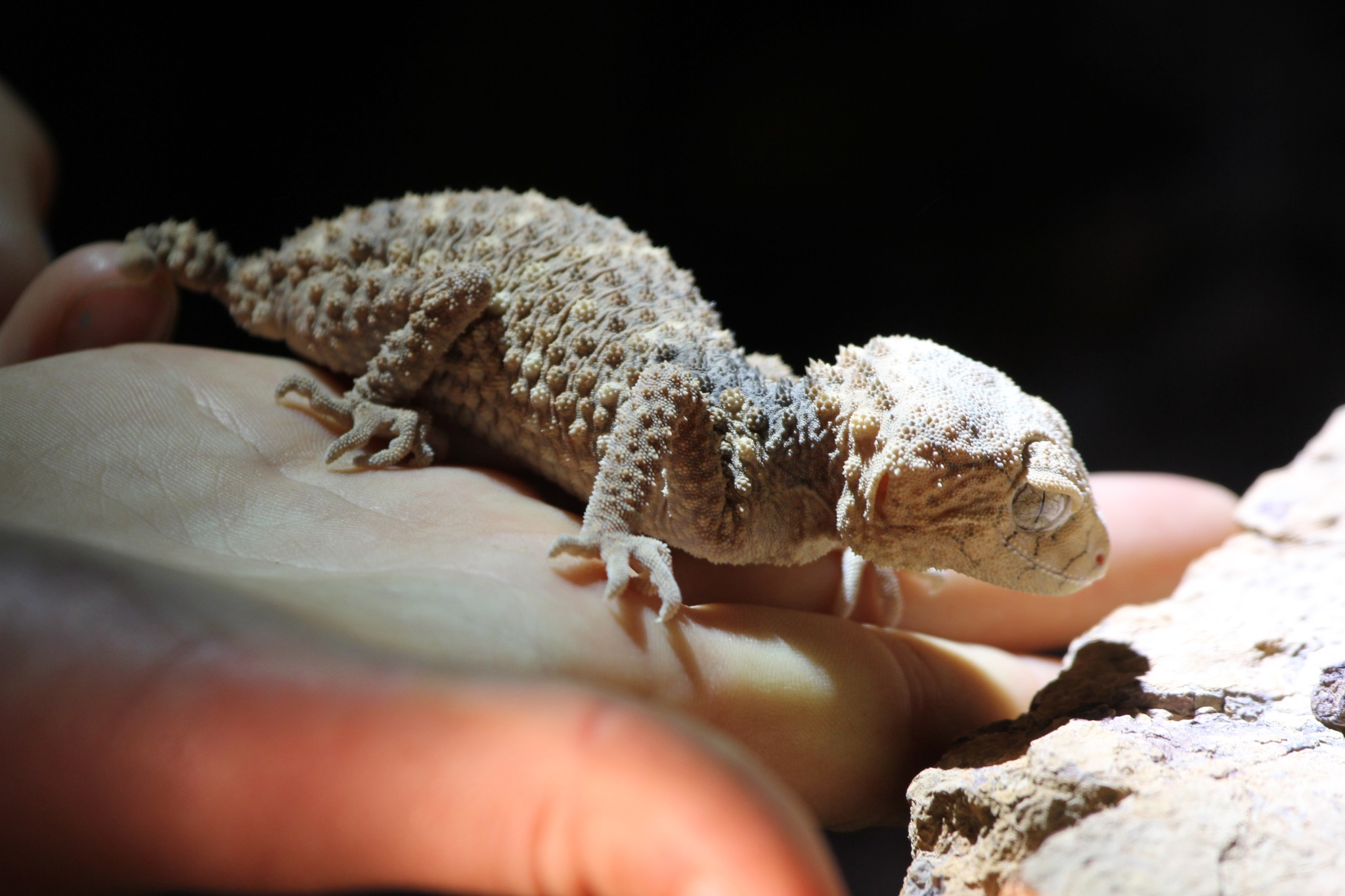

Scientific classification
- Domain: Eukaryota
- Kingdom: Animalia
- Phylum: Chordata
- Class: Reptilia
- Order: Squamata
- Infraorder: Gekkota
- Family: Carphodactylidae
- Genus: Nephrurus
- Species: N. asper

Binomial name
- Nephrurus asper Günther, 1876

= Nephrurus asper =

Species of lizard

Nephrurus asper, also known as rough knob-tailed gecko, spiny knob-tailed gecko or prickly knob-tailed gecko is a species of gecko. Like all species of Nephrurus it is endemic to Australia. This is one of three similar species that stand alone among all Australian geckos in being unable to discard their tails and grow new ones. Prickly knob-tailed geckos live in dry woodlands and outcrops of Queensland
