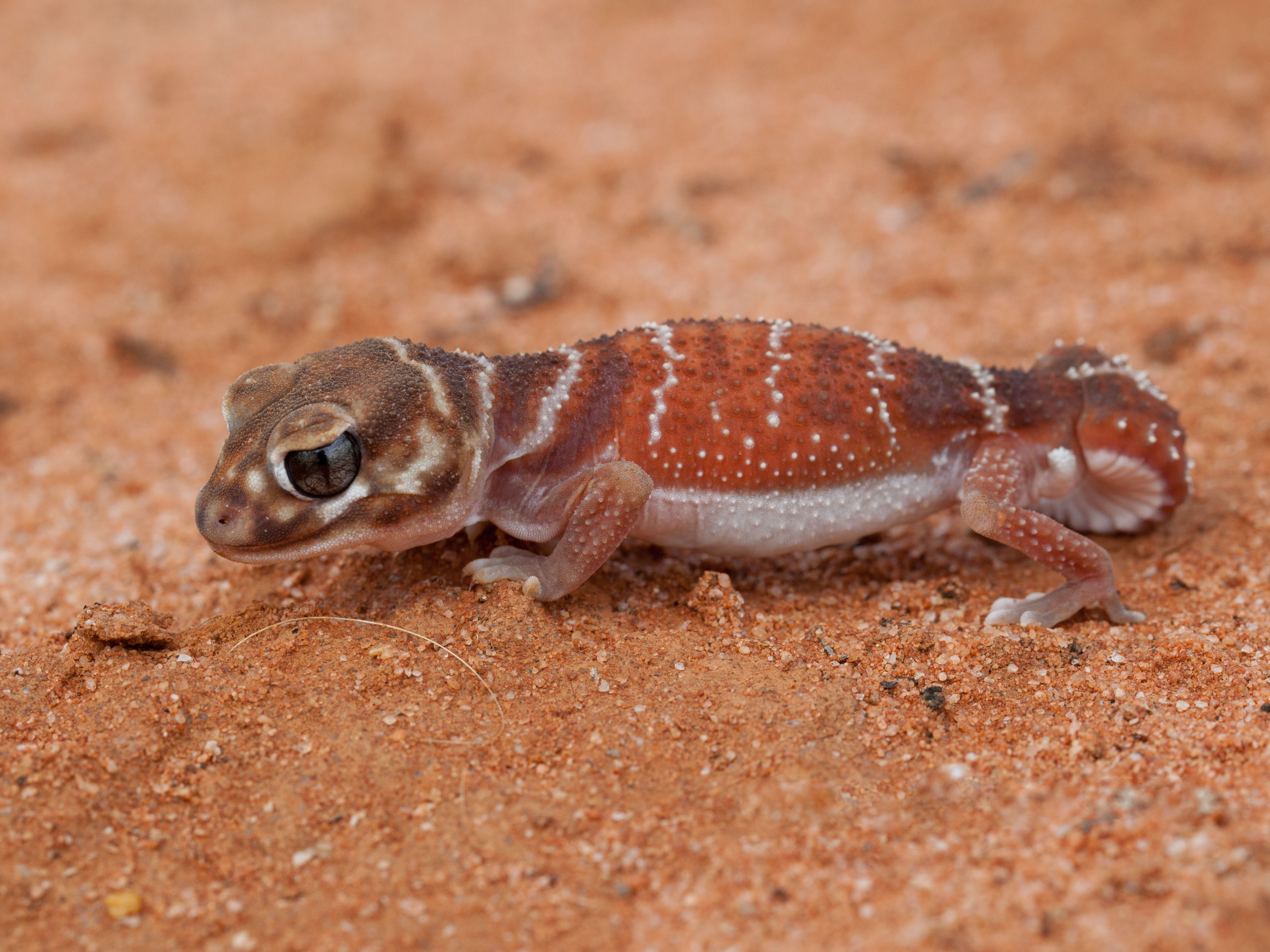

Conservation status
- Least Concern (IUCN 3.1)

Scientific classification
- Kingdom: Animalia
- Phylum: Chordata
- Class: Reptilia
- Order: Squamata
- Suborder: Gekkota
- Family: Carphodactylidae
- Genus: Nephrurus
- Species: N. levis

Binomial name
- Nephrurus levis De Vis, 1886
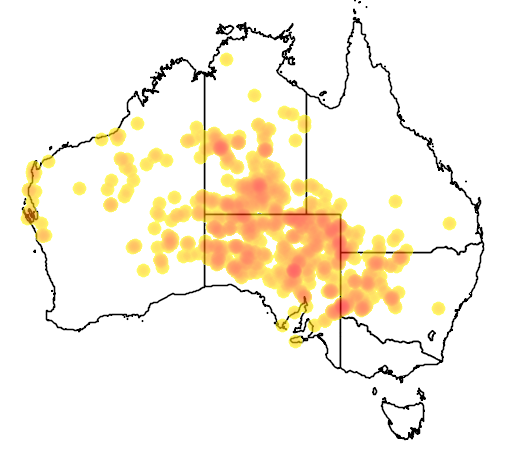
- Distribution of recorded occurrences of ''N. levis''

= Nephrurus levis =

Species of reptile

Nephrurus levis, commonly known as the three-lined knob-tailed gecko, smooth knob-tailed gecko, or common knob-tailed gecko, is a native Australian gecko species. The smooth knob-tailed gecko is part of the Carphodactylidae family, a family endemic to Australia. A common alternative name for this family is "barking geckos" due to the loud barks they make during threat displays, which includes swaying their bodies, winding their tail and attacking with an open mouth. There are multiple sub-species of Nephrurus levis, these include N.l. levis, N.l. occidentalis and N.l. pibarenis. Its various Indigenous names include: Illchilijera from the Arrernte people of central Australia, Wauṟa from the Anangu peoples of the Uluru-Kata Tjuta National Park region in central Australia, Jagajagara in the Ngarluma language from the Pilbara region in Coastal Western Australia, and Tyarla-tyarla from the Wangkangurru people whose traditional lands include parts of the Simpson Desert in South Australia and Queensland.

== Description ==
A robust, medium-sized gecko, with a large, triangular head. It has a short, flattened, carrot shaped like tail, that ends in a knob. This tail can be autotomised to distract predators, however unlike other lizards they have only one cleavage point at the base, meaning it must sacrifice its whole tail in the event. It has long slender limbs with non-retractile claws on digits, of which the outer most one is opposable. The gecko has vertically slit ears at the widest part of its head and very large eyes that have vertical pupils. On the dorsal side, it is generally a pinkish-grey to purplish-brown colour, with a unique pattern of darker and lighter spots, bars or lines. The underbelly is white. N. levis is speckled in pale and dark tubercles on the body and tail which often form bands. Levis means smooth, referring to the skins smoothness compared to the genotype of N. asper (asper meaning rough).

Generally, N. levis are around 8–10 centimetres (3.1–3.9 in) long from snout to vent. The original tail (if not dropped) is usually around 2 centimetres (0.79 in). Males are usually smaller than the females, with both being able to live up to 15 years in captivity.

== Distribution and habitat ==
=== Distribution ===
Smooth knob-tailed geckos are distributed throughout the arid interior of Australia, occurring in all mainland states and territories other than Victoria and the ACT. They are prevalent throughout the state of South Australia, including as far south as Adelaide. They can be commonly found as far north as Tennant Creek, Northern Territory; as far east as Bourke, New South Wales and as far west as Western Australia's coastline.

=== Habitat ===
The smooth knob-tailed gecko is found in a wide range of habitats, including arid, semiarid, open woodland, arid scrubs, spinifex covered deserts, sand-plains and dune-fields.

== Behaviours ==
=== Habits ===
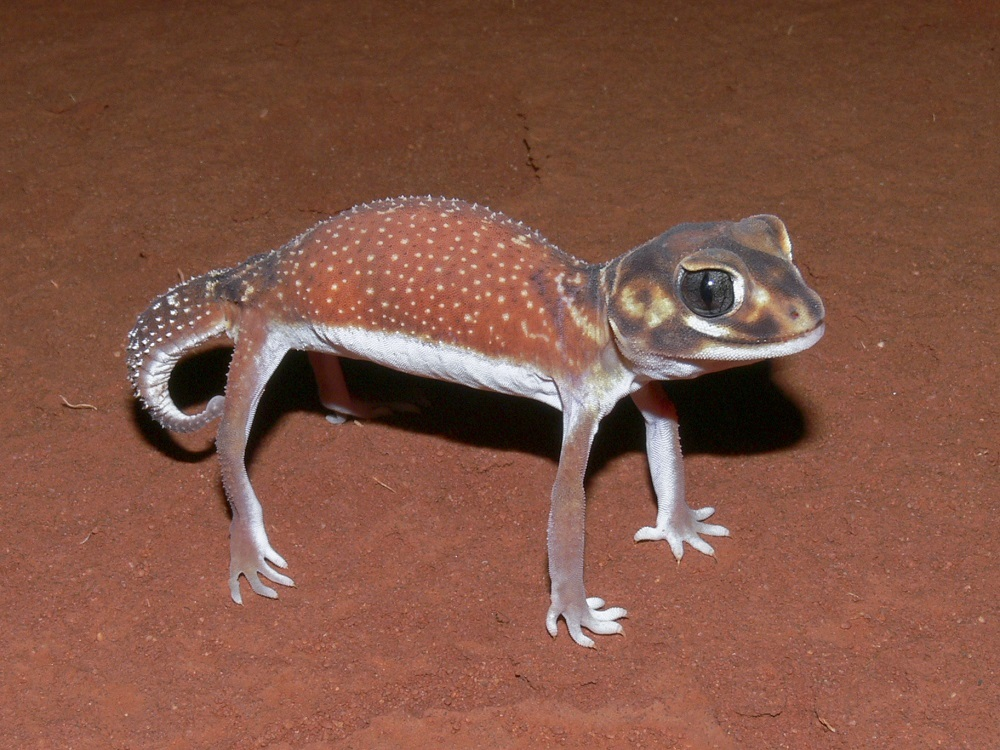
In Western Australia

N. levis is a nocturnal, ground dwelling species, which shelters during the day in self-made or other animals burrows, which it has the ability to seal. It stalks prey at night (particularly after rain), in open areas between shrubs or spinifex. N. levis can survive lower temperatures, and longer exposure to these temperatures, compared with other geckos of the region. This gives the species a distinct advantage when hunting at night; as it is less affected by the lower temperatures, thus making it quicker than its 'cold' prey. However, during very cold nights smooth knob-tailed geckos will burrow.

=== Diet ===
The smooth knob-tailed Gecko is considered to be an insectivore, preying on spiders, grasshoppers, beetles, cockroaches, scorpions, centipedes and even on other smaller geckos.

=== Reproduction ===
The breeding season occurs between October and March (warmer months), with females able to have 6 or 7 clutches of eggs. When females are ready to breed they will show receptive behaviours, allowing the males to mate with them. Non-receptive females will stand their ground, either attacking or running from the male. After mating, deposition takes around 4 to 6 weeks (however can take up to 9 weeks), then the eggs take around 6 to 8 weeks to hatch. Each clutch predominantly has 2 eggs (rarely one).

== Conservation ==
N. levis are listed as 'Least Concern' by the IUCN's Species Red List due to its large range of distribution and lack of any major threats, at the current time. Localized threats for this species are grazing of livestock and land clearing, however unless there is large-scale decline in their abundance there is no need for a higher threat category.

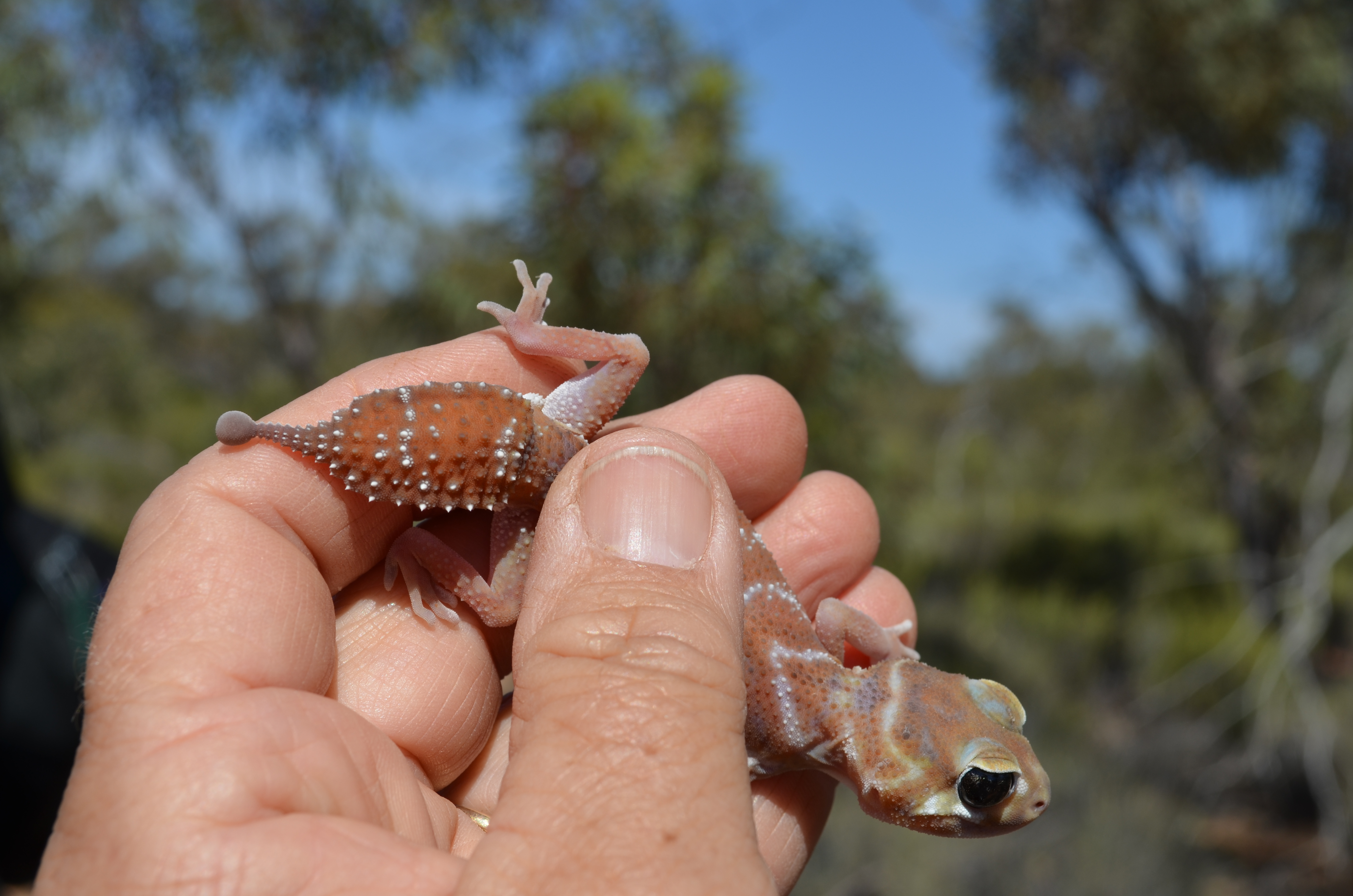
Handling a N. levis caught at Calperum, South Australia

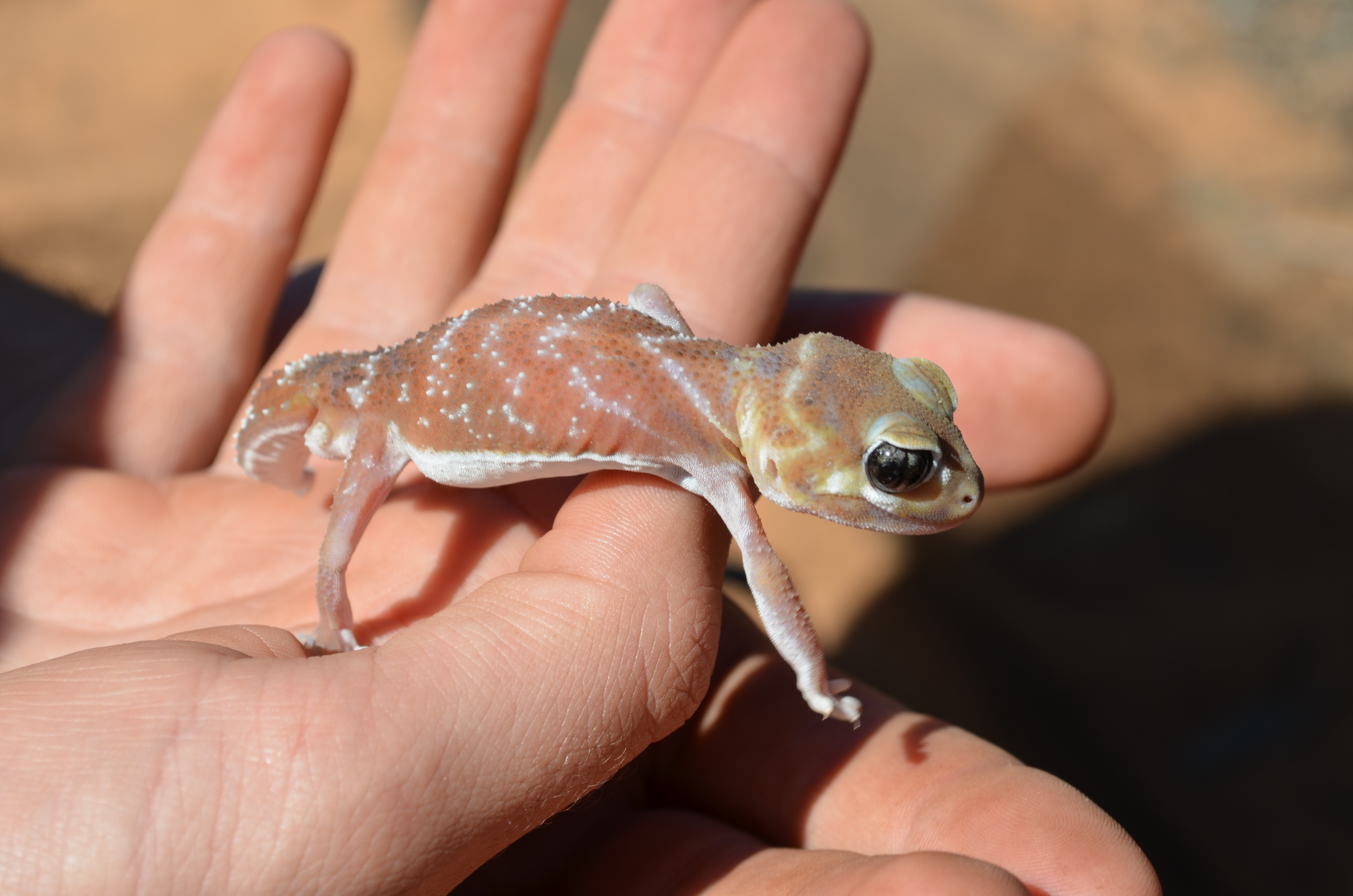
Light phenotype of N. levis at Calperum, South Australia

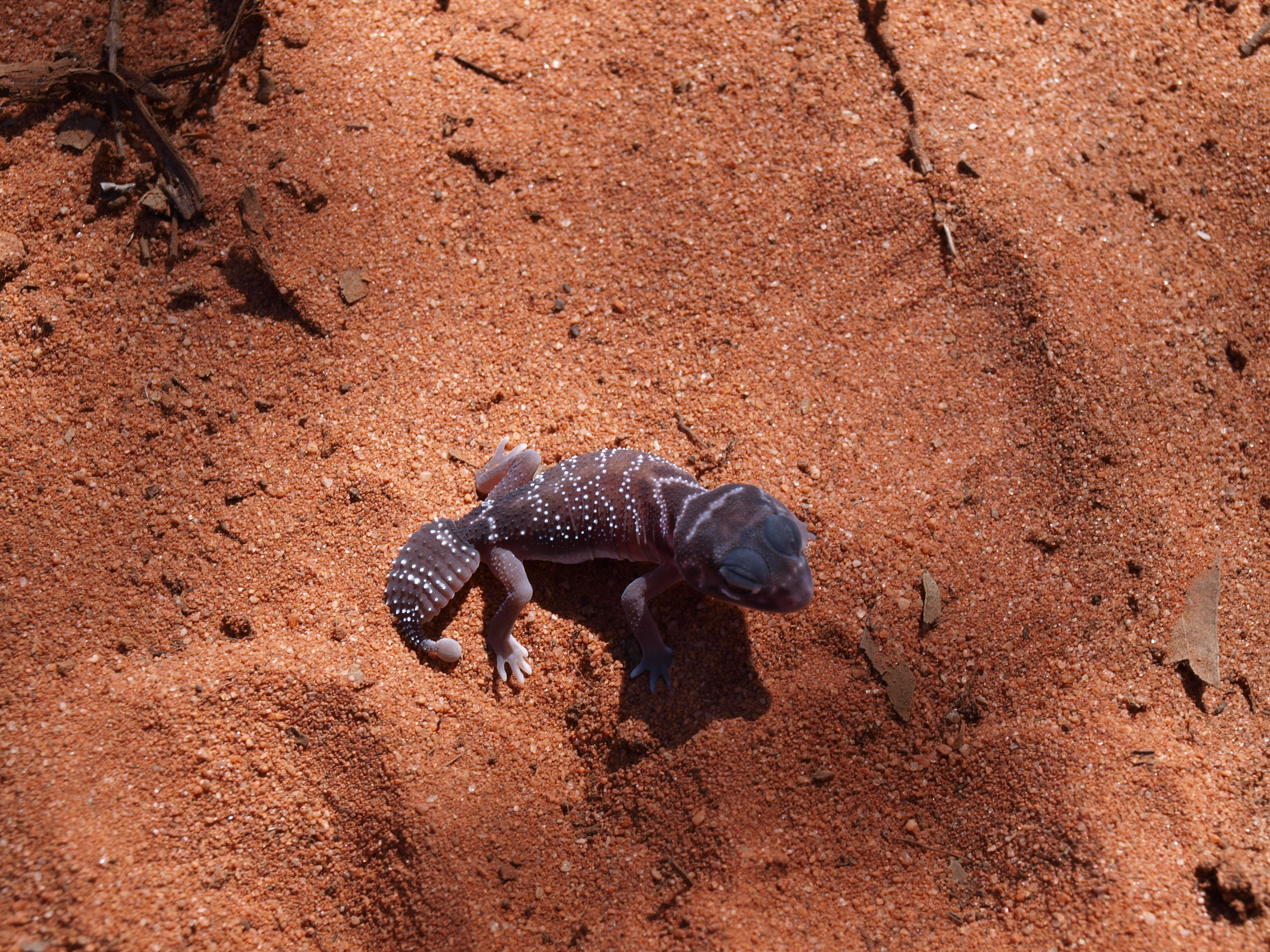
Dark phenotype of N. levis at Calperum, South Australia

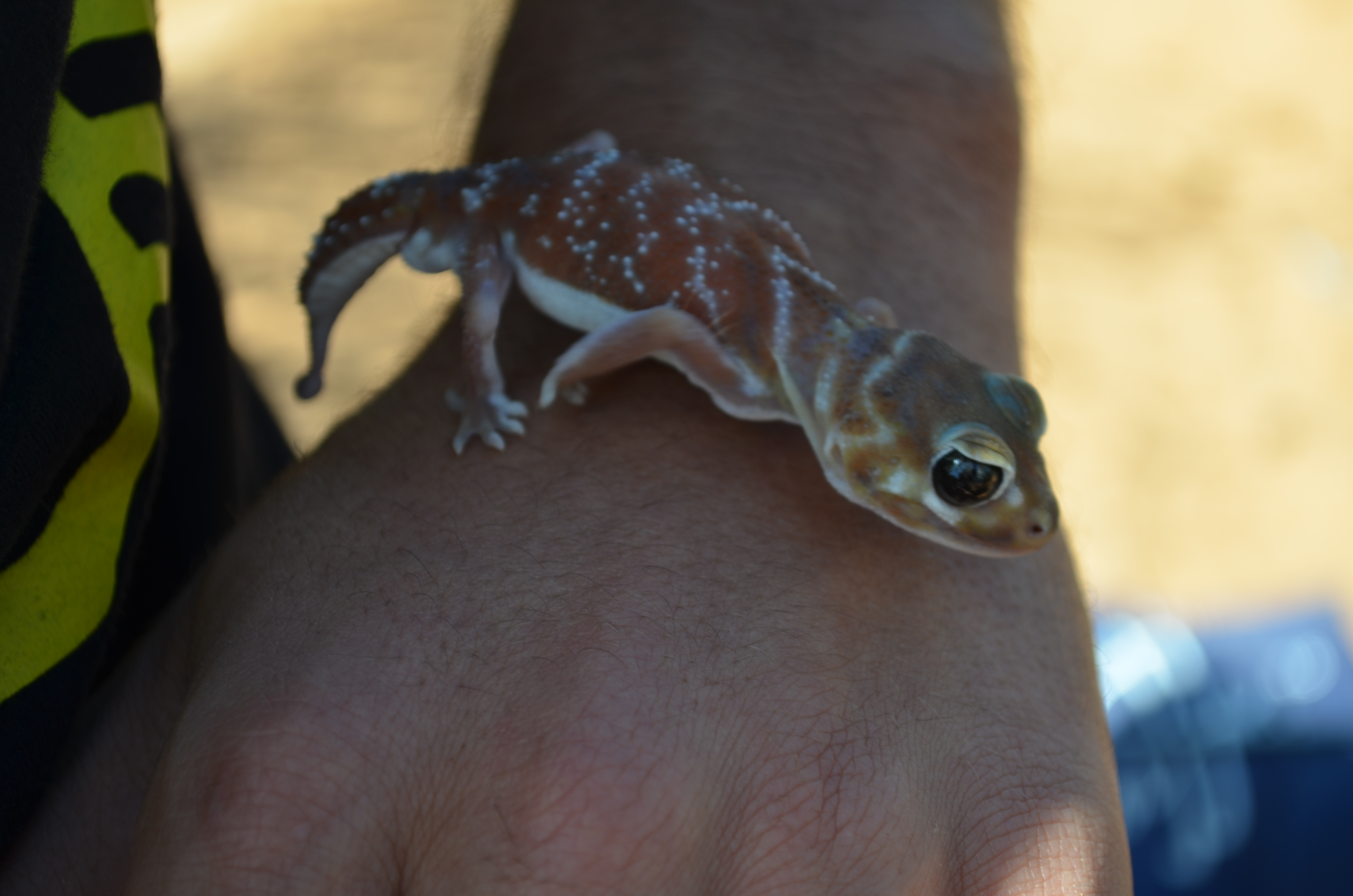
N. levis crawling on hand of volunteer at Calperum, South Australia

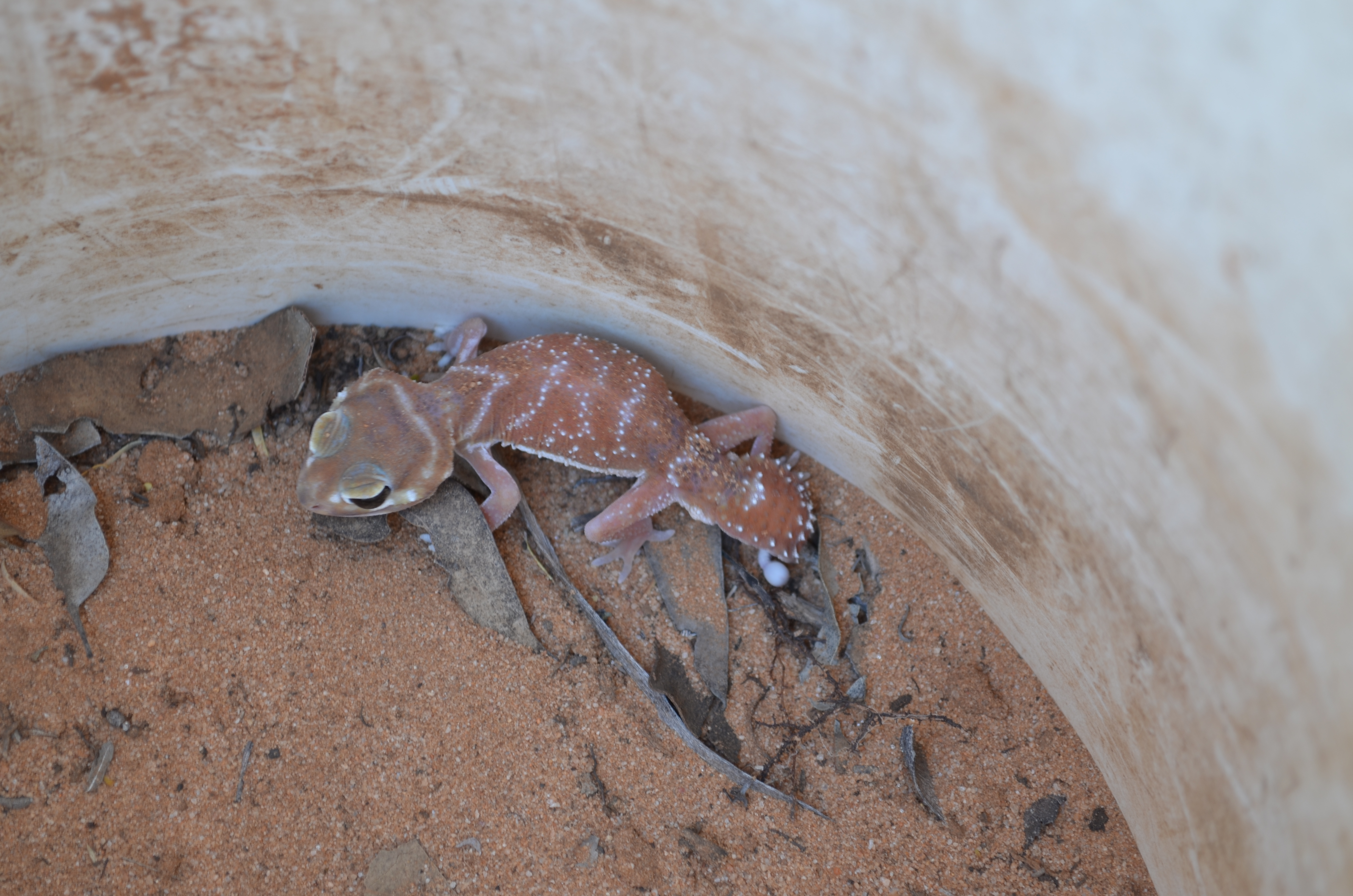
N. levis caught in a pitfall trap at Calperum, South Australia

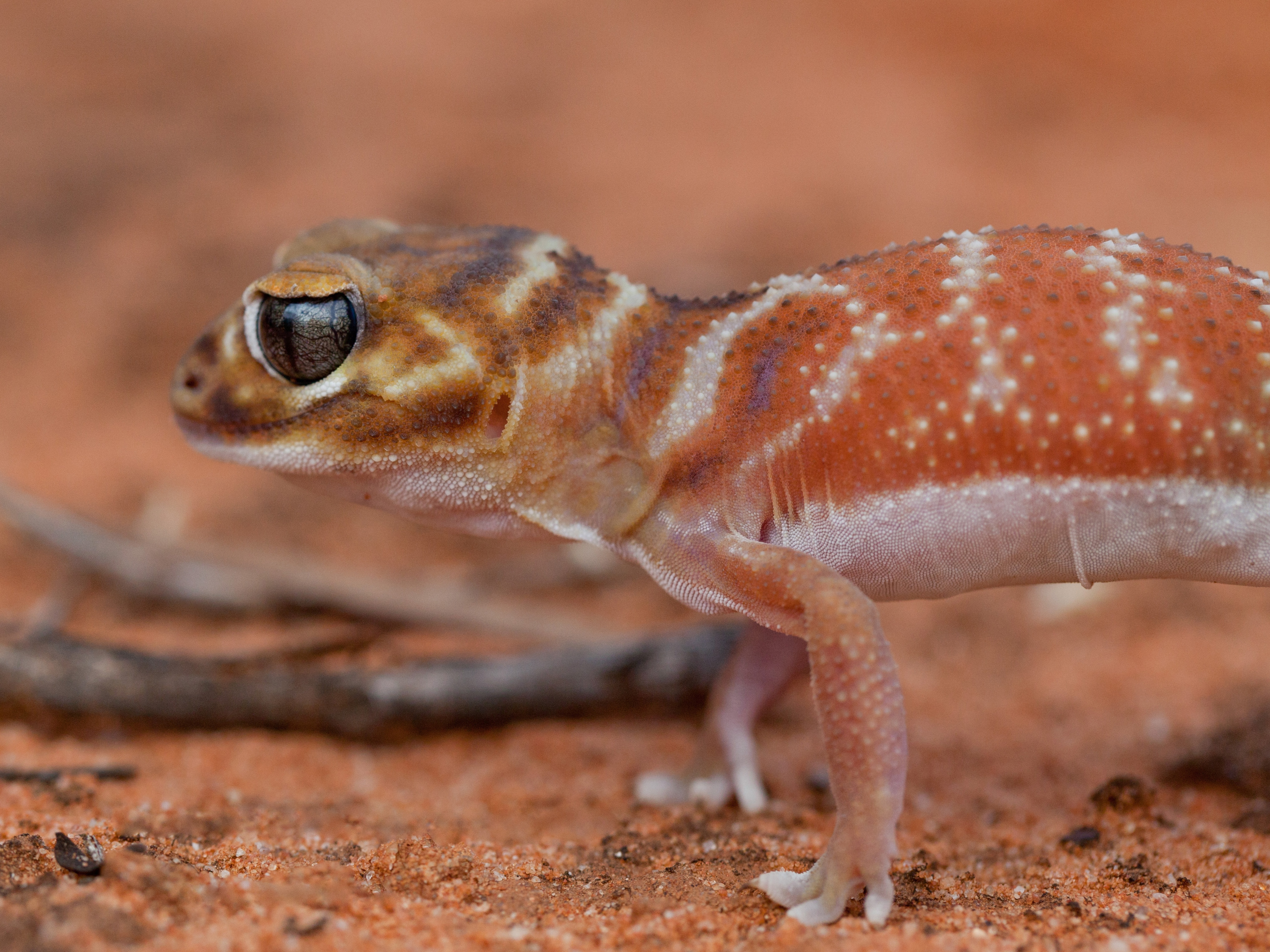
Close up of N. levis, at Calperum, South Australia
