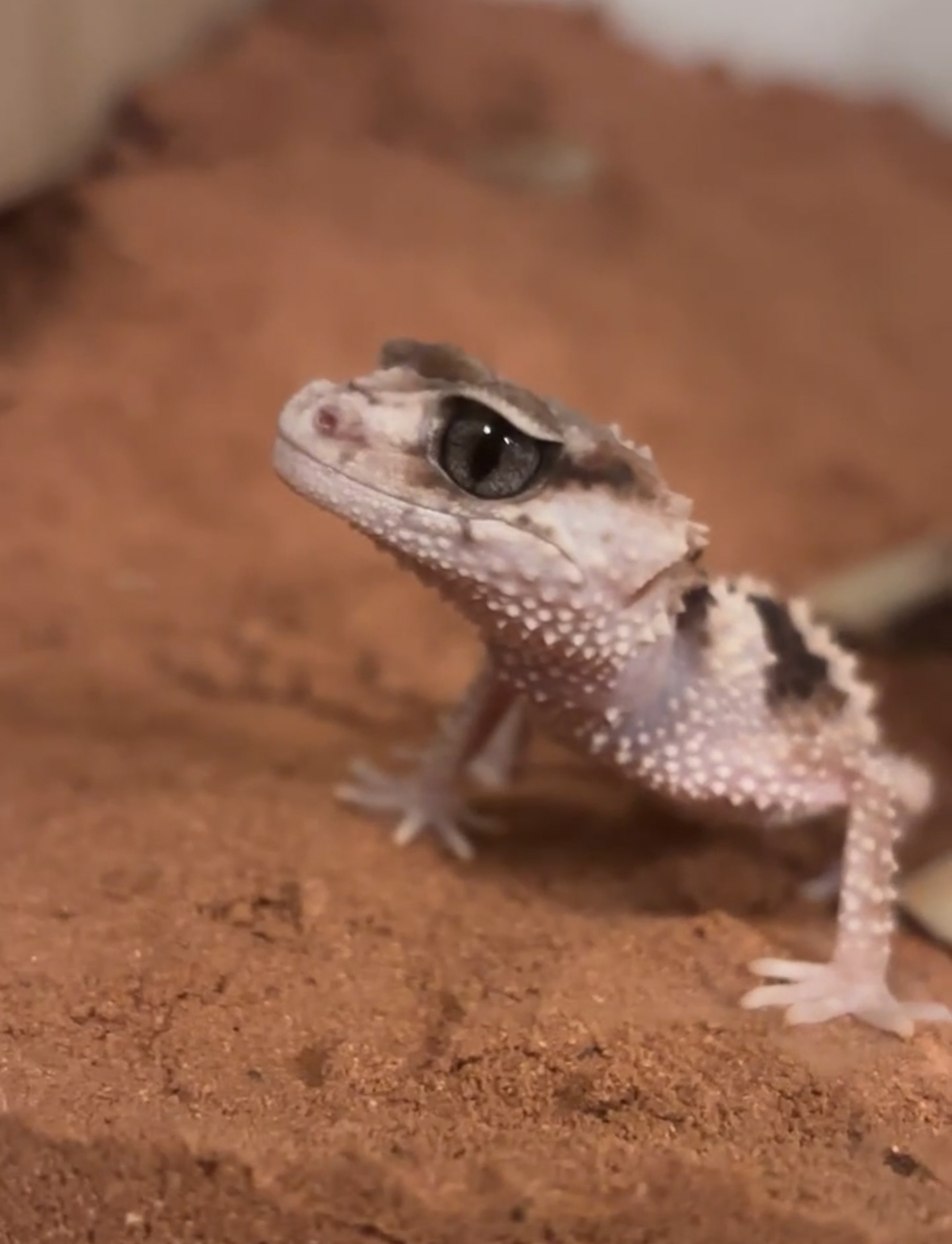

Scientific classification
- Kingdom: Animalia
- Phylum: Chordata
- Class: Reptilia
- Order: Squamata
- Suborder: Gekkota
- Family: Carphodactylidae
- Genus: Nephrurus
- Species: N. cinctus

Binomial name
- Nephrurus cinctus Storr, 1963

= Nephrurus cinctus =

Species of lizard

Nephrurus cinctus, also known as northern banded knob-tailed gecko, is a species of gecko. Like all species of Nephrurus is endemic to Australia.
