= Nephrurus vertebralis =

Scientific classification
- Domain: Eukaryota
- Kingdom: Animalia
- Phylum: Chordata
- Class: Reptilia
- Order: Squamata
- Infraorder: Gekkota
- Family: Carphodactylidae
- Genus: Nephrurus
- Species: N. vertebralis

Binomial name
- Nephrurus vertebralis Storr, 1963

Species of lizard

Nephrurus vertebralis, also known as midline knob-tailed gecko, is a species of gecko. Like all species of Nephrurus is endemic to Australia.
