= Nephrurus eromanga =

Scientific classification
- Kingdom: Animalia
- Phylum: Chordata
- Class: Reptilia
- Order: Squamata
- Suborder: Gekkota
- Family: Carphodactylidae
- Genus: Nephrurus
- Species: N. eromanga

Binomial name
- Nephrurus eromanga Oliver, Donnellan, & Gunn, 2022

Species of lizard

Nephrurus eromanga is a species of gecko. Like all species of Nephrurus it is endemic to Australia. It is named after Eromanga Basin.
