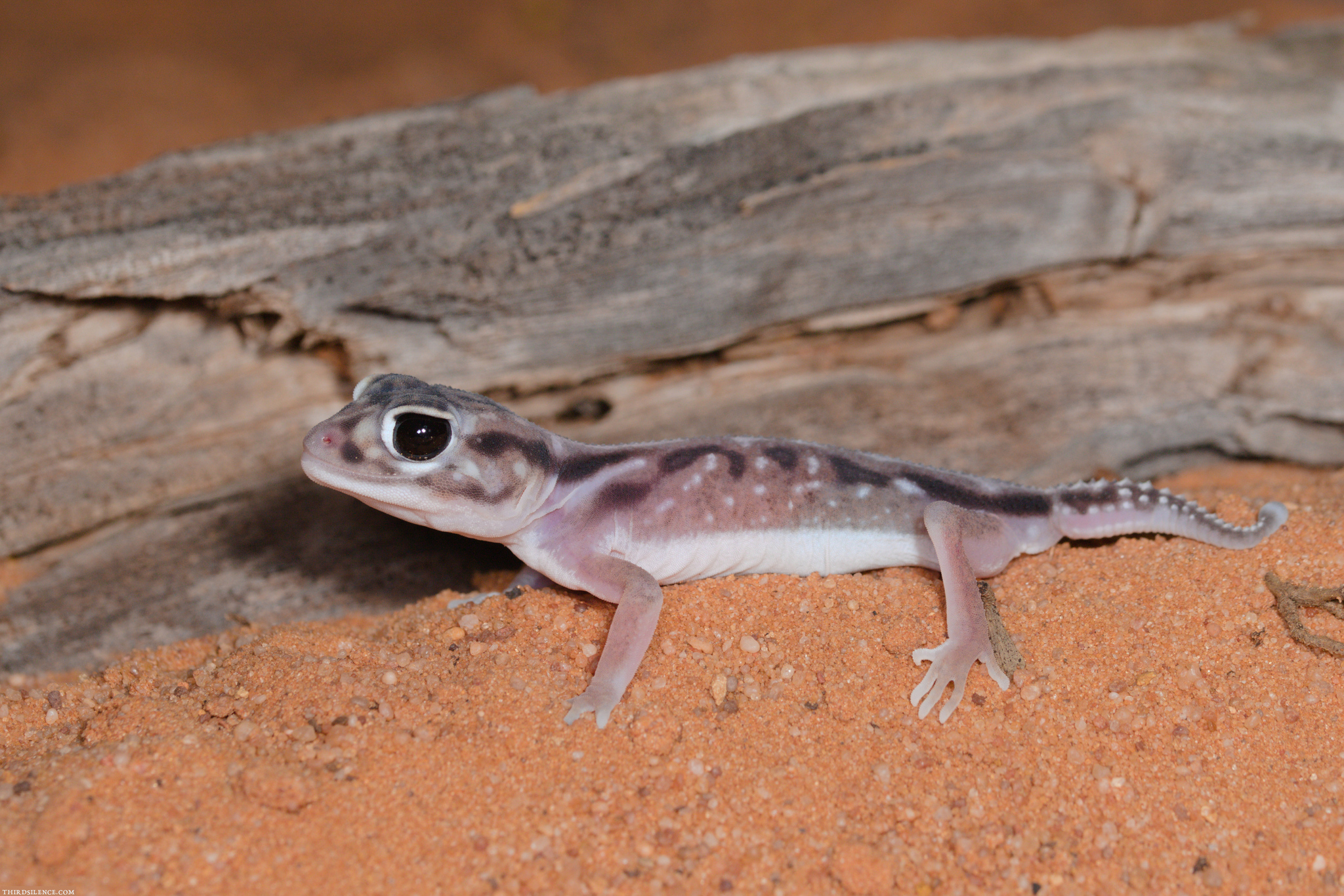

Conservation status
- Least Concern (IUCN 3.1)

Scientific classification
- Kingdom: Animalia
- Phylum: Chordata
- Class: Reptilia
- Order: Squamata
- Suborder: Gekkota
- Family: Carphodactylidae
- Genus: Nephrurus
- Species: N. deleani

Binomial name
- Nephrurus deleani Harvey, 1983

= Nephrurus deleani =

Species of lizard

Nephrurus deleani, also known commonly as the acacia knob-tailed gecko, the Pernatty knob-tail, and the Pernatty knob-tailed gecko, is a species of lizard in the family Carphodactylidae. The species is endemic to Australia.

== Etymology ==
The specific name, deleani, is in honor of Australian statistician Steven Delean, who collected the holotype.

== Geographic range ==
N. deleani is found in the Australian state of South Australia.

== Habitat ==
The preferred natural habitat of N. deleani is coastal sand dunes.

== Reproduction ==
N. deleani is oviparous.
