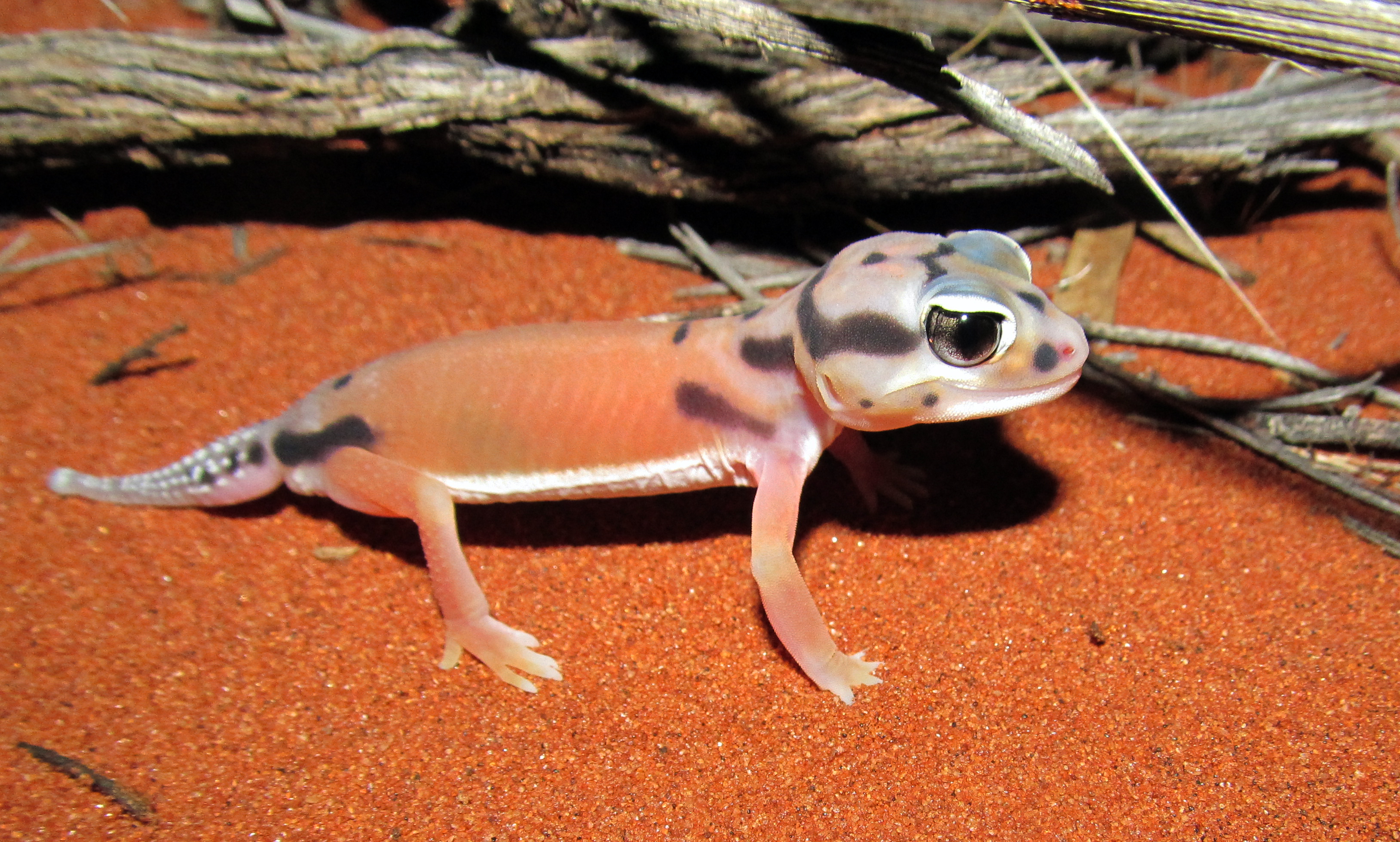

Scientific classification
- Domain: Eukaryota
- Kingdom: Animalia
- Phylum: Chordata
- Class: Reptilia
- Order: Squamata
- Infraorder: Gekkota
- Family: Carphodactylidae
- Genus: Nephrurus
- Species: N. laevissimus

Binomial name
- Nephrurus laevissimus Mertens, 1958

= Nephrurus laevissimus =

Species of lizard

Nephrurus laevissimus, also known as the smooth knob-tailed gecko , is a species of gecko. Like all species of Nephrurus, it is endemic to Australia.
