= Australian Saddleback Tumbler =

Breed of pigeon

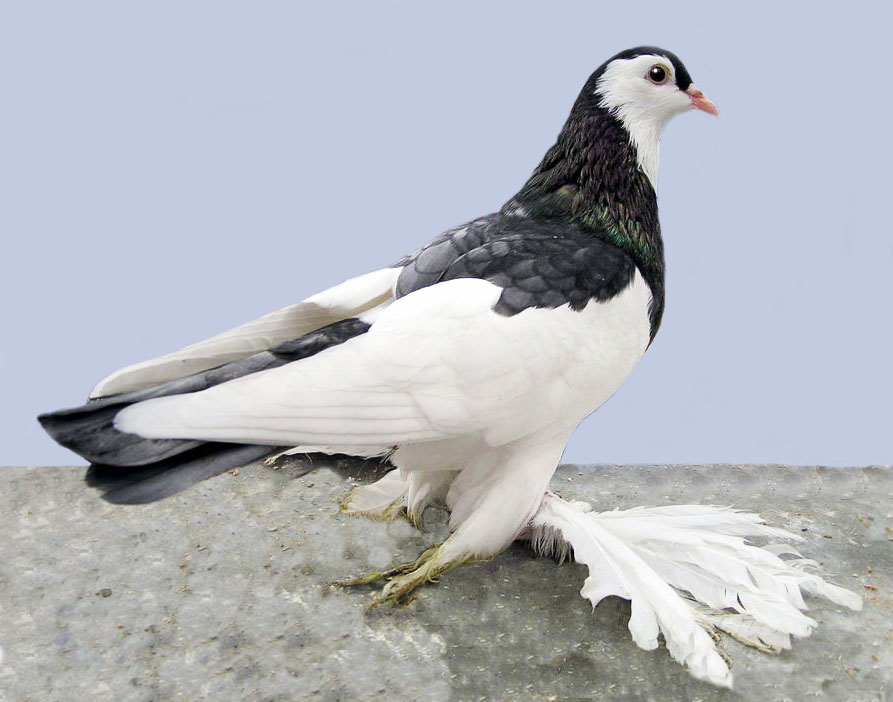
- Australian Saddleback Tumbler
- Conservation status: Common
- Country of origin: Australia

Classification
- US Breed Group: Tumblers, Rollers and High Flyers

Notes
- This breed is known for its distinctive color pattern

The Australian Saddleback Tumbler is a breed of fancy pigeon developed over many years of selective breeding. Australian Saddleback Tumblers, along with other varieties of domesticated pigeons, are all descendants of the rock pigeon (Columba livia). As the name suggests, this breed is an Australian creation and was first recognized as a breed in 1917.

The breed is usually muffed (feather-legged) but a clean-legged variety does exist. The name of the breed derives from a distinctive saddle-shaped marking on the back. The marking on the head can be either a stripe (most common) or a spot. Australian Saddleback Tumblers can be shown in any color, but some of the more common are black, red, yellow, blue, silver, almond, and andalusian.

== See also ==
- List of pigeon breeds
