= Giant centipede =

Giant centipede may refer to a wide range of large centipedes, notably:

- Cormocephalus rubriceps, a large centipede native to Australia and New Zealand
- Ethmostigmus rubripes, a large centipede found in Australia, New Guinea, Solomon Islands, Indonesia, Southeast Asia and China
- Any centipede of the genus Scolopendra, which contains over 70 known species, all of which can reach a length of at least 10 cm (4 inches), with many species exceeding 20 cm (8 inches)
  - Scolopendra gigantea, the largest species of centipede in the world, found in tropical South America
