= Norwich Cropper =

Breed of pigeon

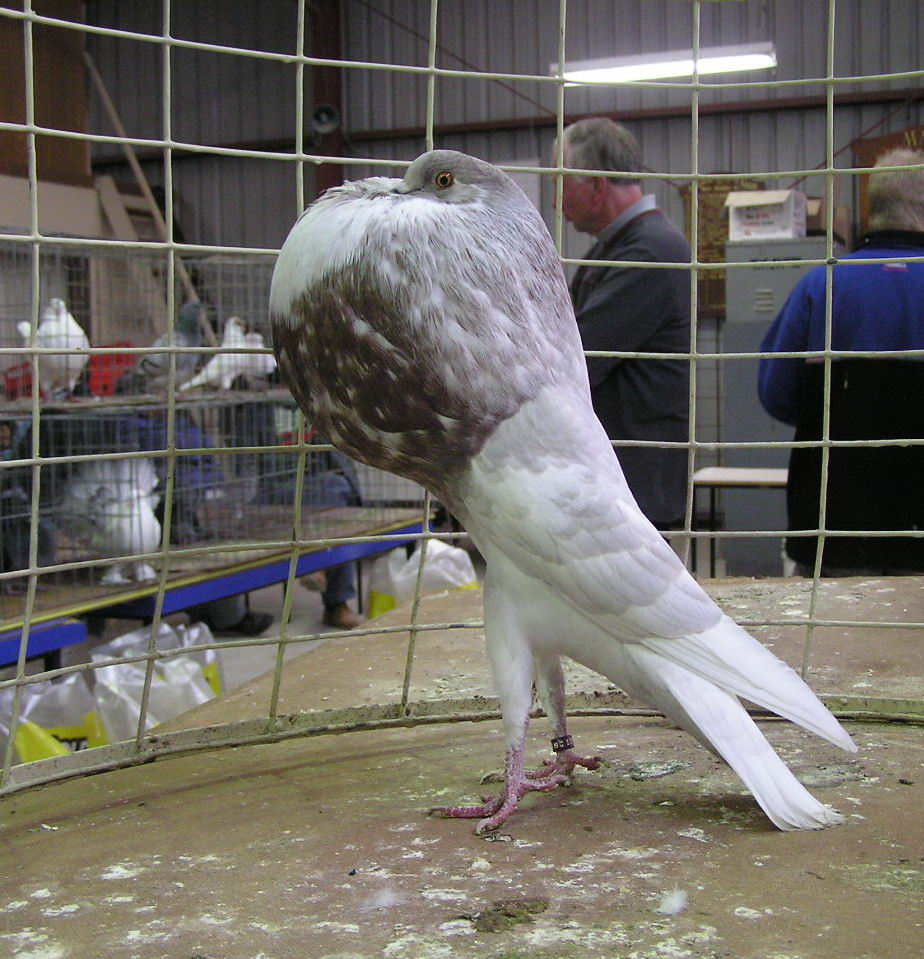
- Norwich Cropper
- Conservation status: Common
- Country of origin: Netherlands

Classification
- Australian Breed Group: Pouter/Cropper group 5
- US Breed Group: Cropper & Pouters
- EE Breed Group: Cropper GB 306

Notes
- Stands upright with an enlarged crop during display

The Norwich Cropper is a breed of fancy pigeon developed over many years of selective breeding. The Norwich Cropper along with other varieties of domesticated pigeons are all descendants from the rock pigeon (Columba livia). The Norwich Cropper is thought to have been developed from a breed called the Oploper and is of Dutch origin.

== Gallery ==
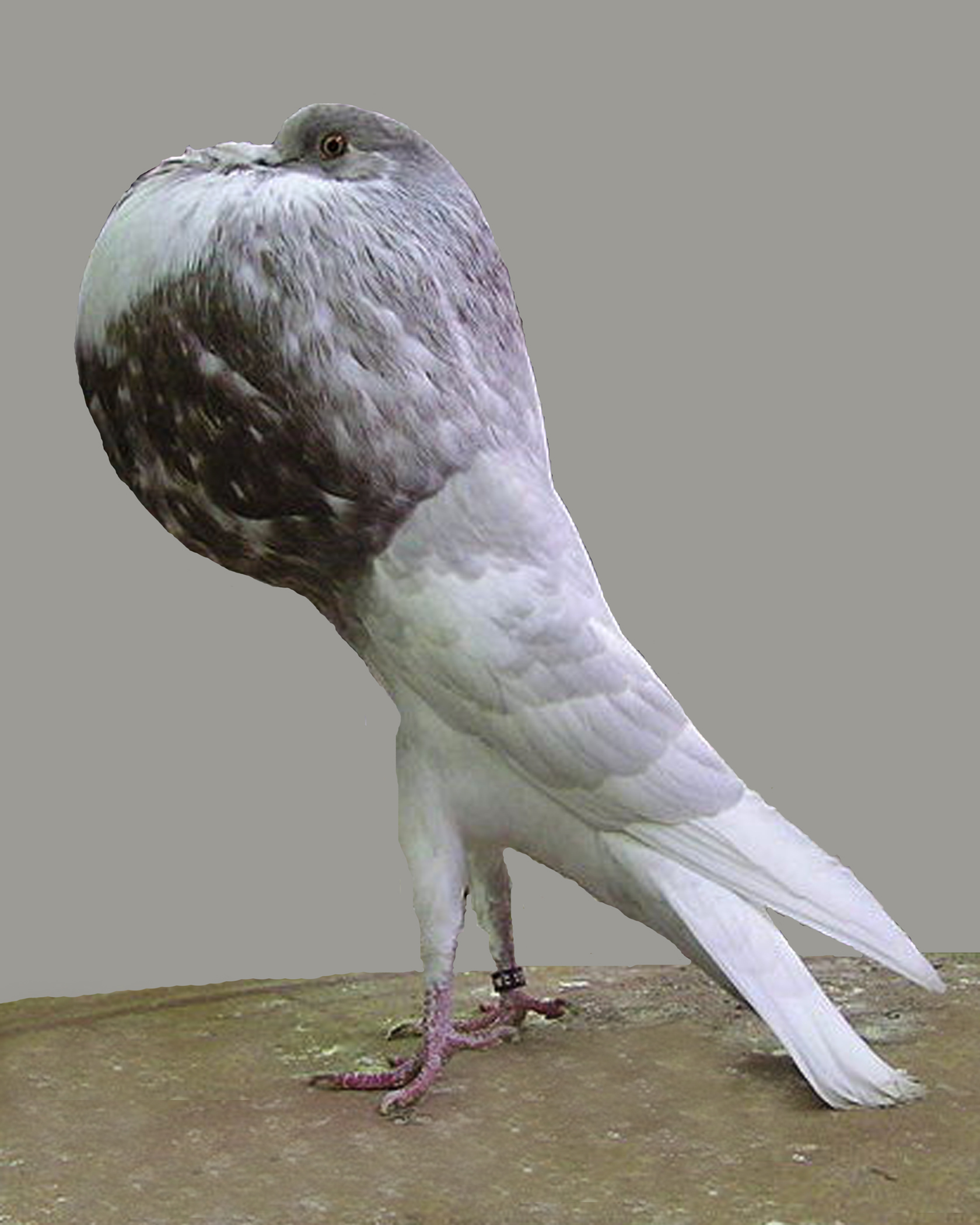
Barless Norwich Cropper

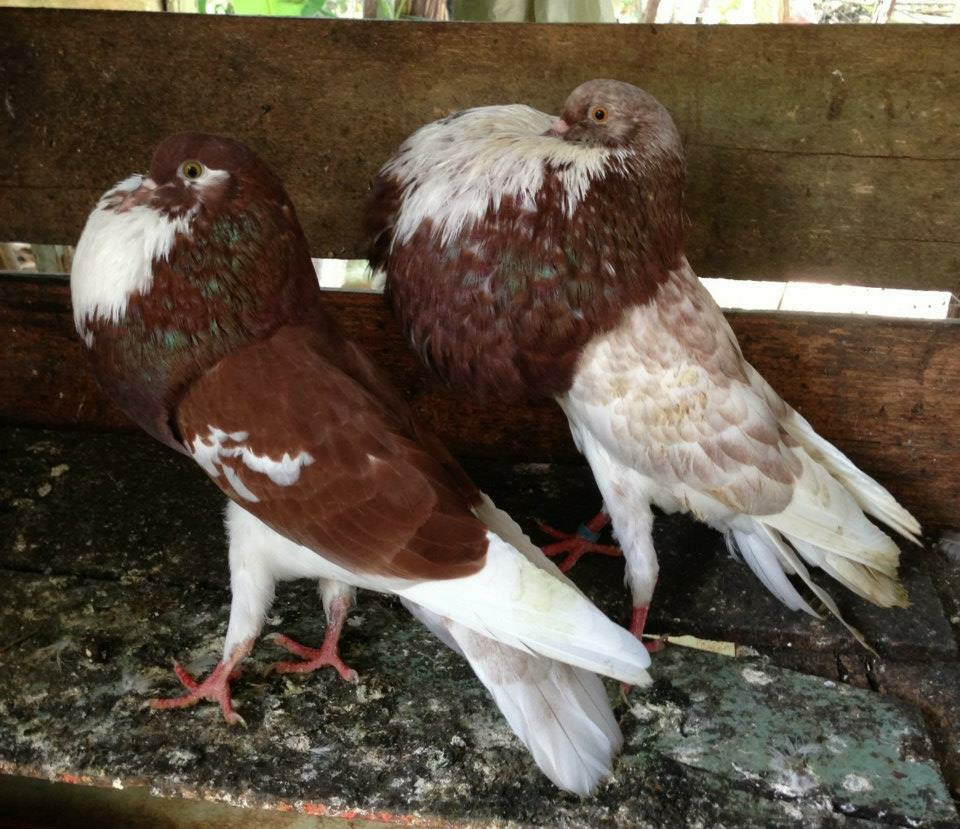
Norwich Cropper

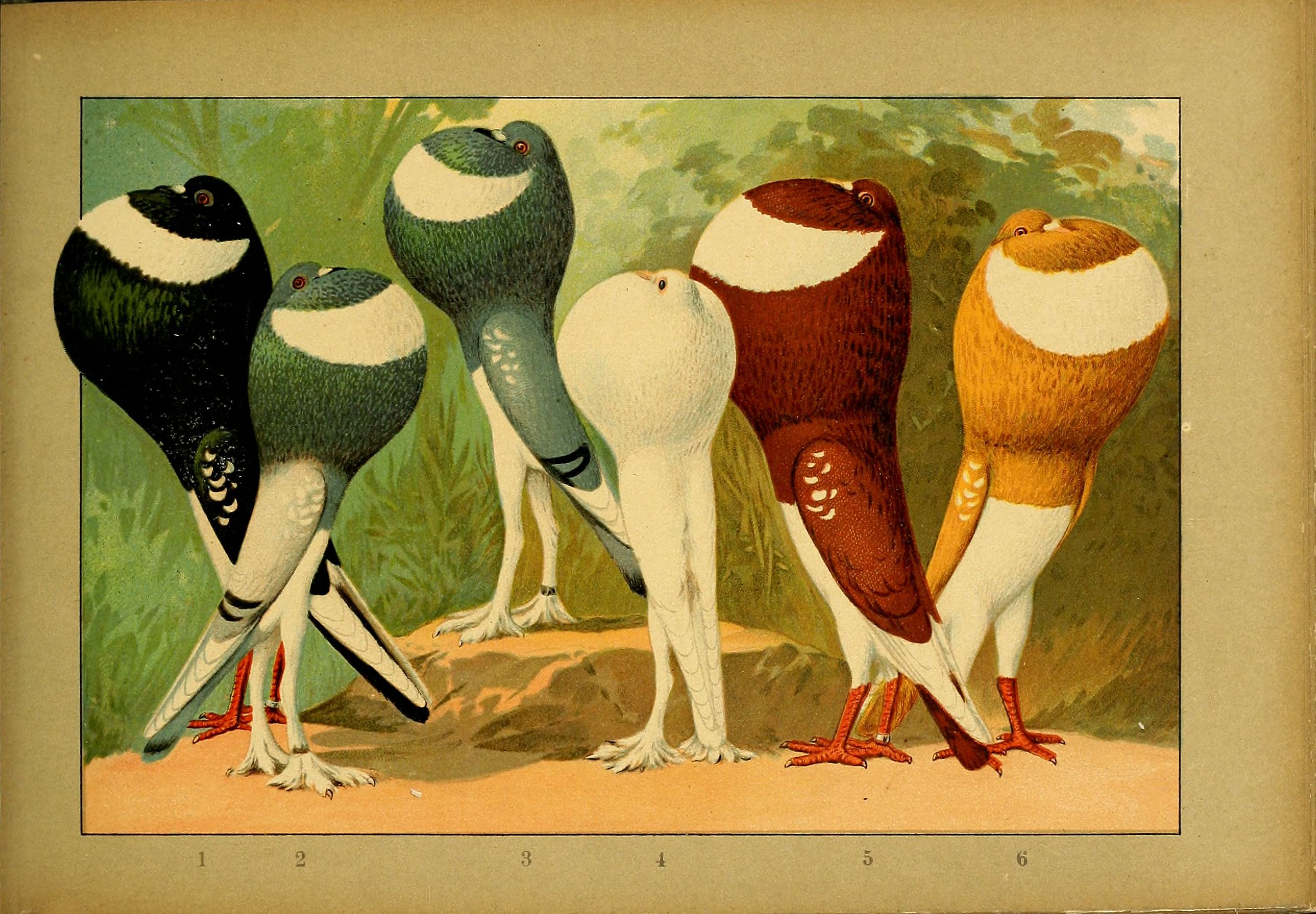
Schachtzabel 1906 Tafel 63

== See also ==
- Pigeon Diet
- Pigeon Housing
- List of pigeon breeds
