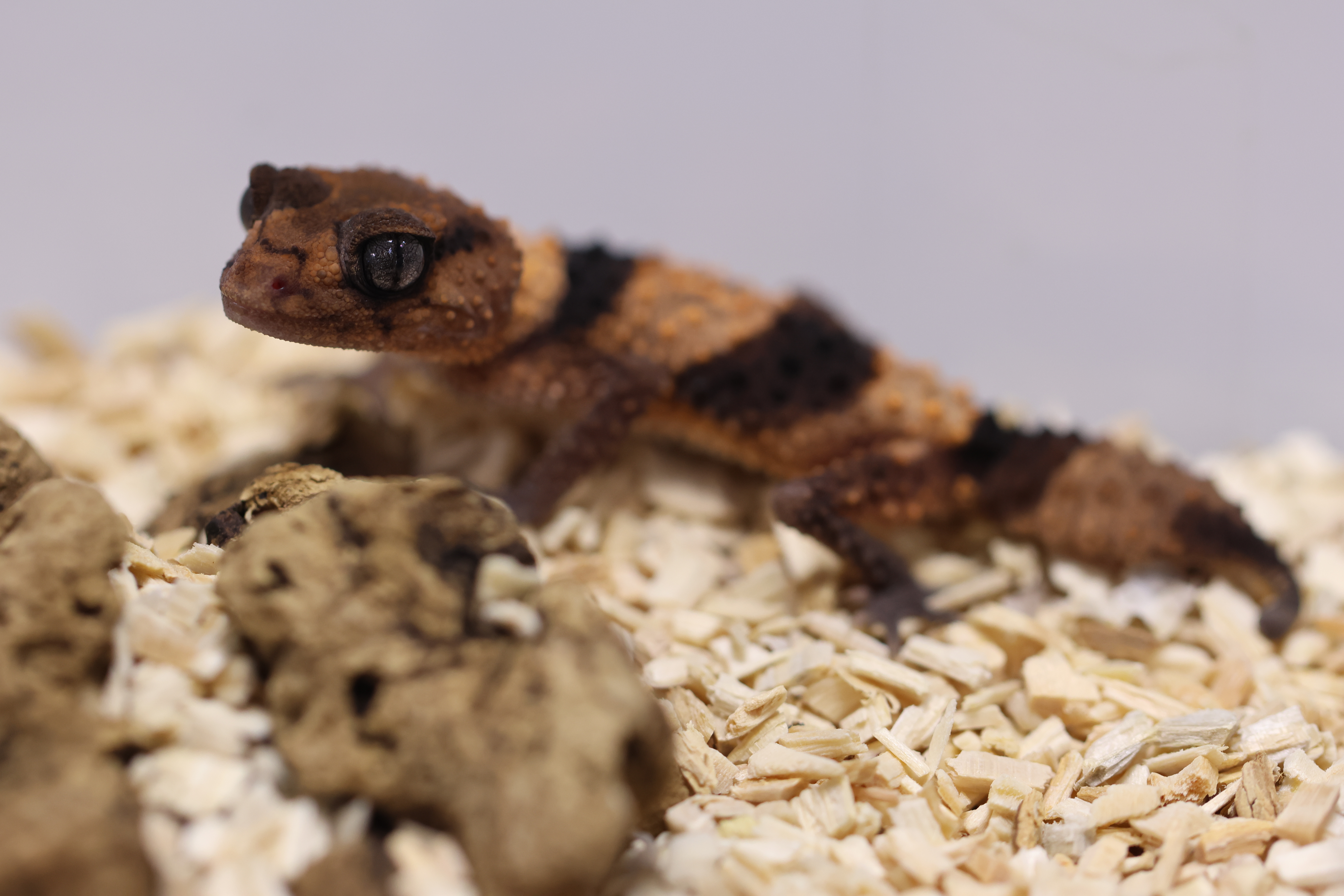

Conservation status
- Least Concern (IUCN 3.1)

Scientific classification
- Kingdom: Animalia
- Phylum: Chordata
- Class: Reptilia
- Order: Squamata
- Suborder: Gekkota
- Family: Carphodactylidae
- Genus: Nephrurus
- Species: N. wheeleri

Binomial name
- Nephrurus wheeleri Loveridge, 1932

= Nephrurus wheeleri =

Species of lizard

Nephrurus wheeleri, also known commonly as the banded knob-tailed gecko, the southern banded knob-tailed gecko, and Wheeler's knob-tailed gecko, is a species of lizard in the family Carphodactylidae. The species, like all species of Nephrurus, is endemic to Australia.

== Etymology ==
The specific name, wheeleri, is in honor of American entomologist William Morton Wheeler.

== Geographic range ==
N. wheeleri is found in the Australian state of Western Australia.

== Habitat ==
The preferred natural habitats of N. wheeleri are shrubland and rocky areas.

== Reproduction ==
N. wheeleri is oviparous.
