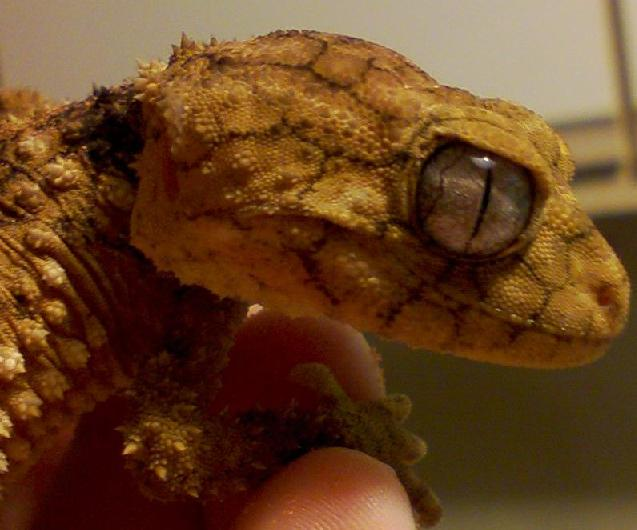

Conservation status
- Least Concern (IUCN 3.1)

Scientific classification
- Kingdom: Animalia
- Phylum: Chordata
- Class: Reptilia
- Order: Squamata
- Suborder: Gekkota
- Family: Carphodactylidae
- Genus: Nephrurus
- Species: N. amyae

Binomial name
- Nephrurus amyae Couper in Couper & Gregson, 1994

= Nephrurus amyae =

Species of lizard

Nephrurus amyae, also known commonly as the Centralian rough knob-tail gecko, is a species of lizard in the family Carphodactylidae. It is the largest gecko in the genus Nephrurus, and like all species of Nephrurus is endemic to Australia.

== Etymology ==
The specific name, amyae, is in honor of Amy Couper, daughter of Australian herpetologist Patrick J. Couper.

== Geographic range ==
N. amyae is found primarily in the central portion of Australia (sometimes referred to as Centralia), including in Northern Territory and in extreme eastern Western Australia.

== Habitat ==
The preferred natural habitats of N. amyae are desert and rocky areas.

== Description ==
N. amyae generally has a brown to reddish color and a small tail with a knob on the end. It may attain a snout-to-vent length (SVL) of 13.5 cm (5.3 in).

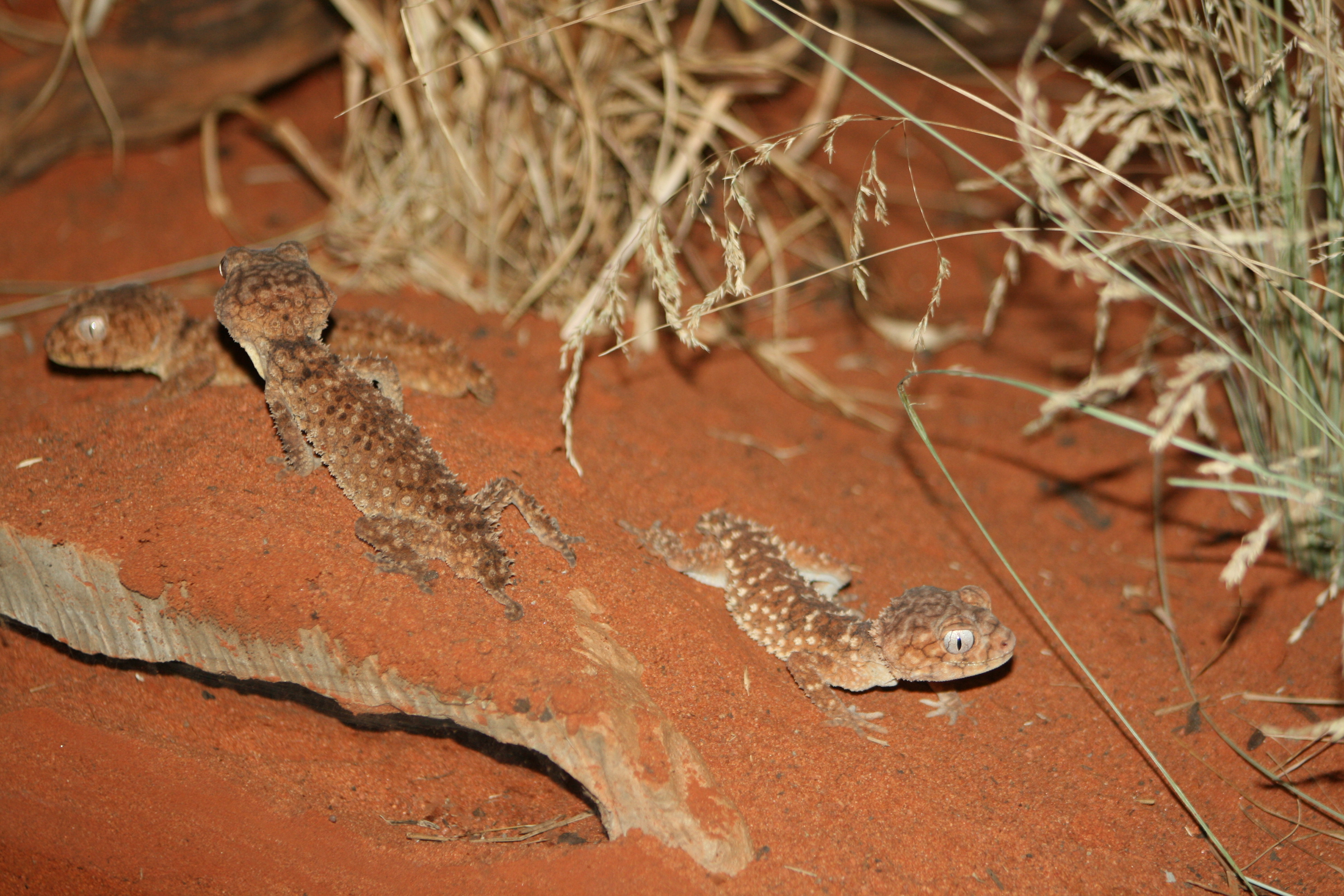
Exemplars of Nephrurus amyae

== Reproduction ==
N. amyae is oviparous.
